= Joshua Bradford =

Canadian singer, songwriter, composer, and television host

- Born: Canada
- Occupation(s): Singer, songwriter, composer, actor, television host
- Instrument: Vocals
- Years active: 1997–present
- Website: www.joshuabradfordofficial.com

Joshua Bradford is a Canadian singer, songwriter, and composer. He is known as the vocalist for the industrial rock band Stayte, as a touring and recording member of Revolting Cocks, and for contributing to works by Ministry. Bradford has also composed for film, and is the founder of the non-profit organization Project Simple Shelter.

== Career ==
=== Stayte ===
Bradford co-founded the industrial rock band Stayte with Clayton Worbeck in the late 1990s. The band released several recordings independently before issuing the albums Abandon in the Amber (2003) and Cognitive Dissonance (The Art of Lying to Yourself) (2007).

Other releases, including Growing Pains, The Two Sisters, and Orogenesis, were self-released and have not received independent coverage in music press.

=== Revolting Cocks ===
In 2006, Bradford joined Revolting Cocks, the industrial rock group led by Al Jourgensen. He contributed vocals on the albums Sex-O Olympic-O (2009), Sex-O MiXXX-O (2009), and ¿Got Cock? (2010).

Bradford also toured with the group during this period, listed as part of the band's lineup on their 2009 LuBriCaTouR.

Bradford's song "Wizard of Sextown" appeared on the official soundtrack to the horror film Saw V (2008).

=== Ministry ===
Bradford contributed vocals to Ministry's 2008 covers album Cover Up, including the track "Bang a Gong (Get It On)". He also sang on several Ministry recordings:

- "Keys to the City" (2008) – vocals
- "Cuz U R Next" (2008) – vocals (Saw V soundtrack)
- The Last Sucker (2007) – backing vocals in live performances

=== Simple Shelter ===
Bradford has also released music under the project name Simple Shelter. His stage persona in these performances has been described as eccentric and theatrical.

=== Film scoring ===
Bradford and Worbeck composed the score for the feature film Dead Within (2014).

=== Project Simple Shelter ===
Bradford founded the non-profit Project Simple Shelter, which provides music workshops and collaborative songwriting projects in underserved communities. The program has been noted in coverage of his musical career.

== Discography ==
=== With Stayte ===
- Growing Pains (independent release)
- Abandon in the Amber (2003)
- Cognitive Dissonance (The Art of Lying to Yourself) (2007)
- The Two Sisters (independent release)
- Orogenesis (independent release)

=== With Simple Shelter ===
- In Dreams Walk With Me (independent release)
- A Phoenix from the Ashes (independent release)
- All Is One (independent release)
- Walking in the Land of Wind and Ghost (Soundtrack, independent release)
- The Words We Only Whisper (independent release)
- Songs and Stale Bread (Soundtrack, independent release)

=== With Revolting Cocks ===
- Sex-O Olympic-O (2009)
- Sex-O MiXXX-O (2009)
- ¿Got Cock? (2010)

=== With Ministry ===
- Cover Up (2008) – vocals on "Bang a Gong (Get It On)"
- "Keys to the City" (2008)
- "Cuz U R Next" (2008)
- The Last Sucker (2007) – backing vocals (live performances)
