= AmeriKKKant =

Studio album by Ministry
- Released: March 9, 2018
- Recorded: 2016–2017
- Genre: Industrial metal
- Length: 47:59
- Label: Nuclear Blast
- Producer: Al Jourgensen

Ministry chronology
From Beer to Eternity (2013)	AmeriKKKant (2018)	Moral Hygiene (2021)

Singles from AmeriKKKant
- 1. "Antifa" Released: December 18, 2017; 2. "Twilight Zone" Released: February 21, 2018

AmeriKKKant is the fourteenth studio album by industrial metal band Ministry, which was released on March 9, 2018. It is their first release on Nuclear Blast, and marked the longest gap between studio albums in the group's entire career; at five years, following From Beer to Eternity (2013). AmeriKKKant is also the first Ministry album without guitarist Mike Scaccia since The Last Sucker (2007); Scaccia died in 2012 but appeared posthumously on From Beer to Eternity.

Much like the band's previous Anti-George W. Bush Trilogy (Houses of the Molé, Rio Grande Blood, and The Last Sucker), AmeriKKKant is a concept album about then-US President Donald Trump. The majority of the tracks on the album contains audio samples of Trump.

== Background ==
Frontman Al Jourgensen had previously stated that From Beer to Eternity would be Ministry's final studio album, following the death of longtime guitarist Mike Scaccia, who appears posthumously on the aforementioned album. However, in an April 2016 interview with Loudwire, he stated that they would make a follow-up album "if the circumstances are right."

When asked in July 2016 whether Ministry was going to release another album after From Beer to Eternity, Jourgensen stated, "When I was asked, it was after Mikey passed and the entire media immediately starts asking me what is going to happen to Ministry. He wasn't even buried yet. I thought, 'Fuck you.' I was really pissed and really angry. I said, 'Fuck Ministry and fuck you for asking.' They want to comment on Ministry when my best friend had died. It's been more than two years now, and I got more ideas and I have done albums with Mikey and have done them without him. It's time to get another record out. I have a bunch of songs written in my head. I wanted to have time to mourn before people start asking me about touring dates. It was sick. I was bombarded and email boxes were overloaded with 'what are you going to do now?' It was kind of creepy."

By February 2017, Ministry had begun working on their fourteenth studio album, titled AmeriKKKant. It was later revealed that the album would include guest appearances from Burton C. Bell of Fear Factory, former N.W.A member Arabian Prince, DJ Swamp and Lord of the Cello. During their performance at the Blackest of the Black Fest in Silverado, California in May 2017, Ministry debuted their first song in four years, "Antifa", which, at the time, was expected to appear on AmeriKKKant.

In September 2017, it was announced that Ministry had signed to Nuclear Blast, and that the album's planned late 2017 release date had been pushed back to March 2018, due to "promotional plans and manufacturing deadlines." The album's release date, artwork and track listing were revealed on December 11, 2017.

== Reception ==
Professional ratings
Aggregate scores
Source	Rating
Metacritic	64/100
Review scores
Source	Rating
AllMusic	2/5 stars
The A.V. Club	C
Classic Rock	3.5/5 stars
Crack Magazine	3/10
Exclaim!	6/10
Kerrang!	4/5 stars
Metal Hammer	7/10
PopMatters	6/10
Sputnikmusic	2.4/5

The album received an average score of 64/100 from 11 subscriber reviews on Metacritic, indicating "generally favorable reviews".

In a review for Loudwire, Jon Wiederhorn declared that, "In an age when albums have turned into disposable containers for singles, Jourgensen is still fighting for the integrity of the full-length record, and Amerikkkant, while not exactly a concept album, plays out like a complete piece of art." The Spill Magazine rated the album 4 of 5 stars, lauding the album's ability to "paint a bleak portrait of an America that is on the brink of implosion. This is a record that sounds like a dystopia." Conversely, AllMusic's Paul Simpson gave the album 2/5 stars and stated that "AmeriKKKant finds the industrial metal juggernauts railing against the alt-right, racist Internet trolls, fake news, and everything else to do with the aftermath of the 2016 election. While some of the Bush-era albums found the group reinvigorated after the lackluster Filth Pig and Dark Side of the Spoon, AmeriKKKant is just a depressing slog through and through, perfectly summed up by its Statue of Liberty facepalm cover art."

== Track listing ==
All words and music by Al Jourgensen

No.	Title	Length
1.	"I Know Words"	3:15
2.	"Twilight Zone"	8:03
3.	"Victims of a Clown"	8:18
4.	"TV 5/4 Chan"	0:49
5.	"We're Tired of It"	2:48
6.	"Wargasm"	6:19
7.	"Antifa"	4:56
8.	"Game Over"	5:01
9.	"AmeriKKKa"	8:30

== Personnel ==
=== Ministry ===
- Al Jourgensen – samplers (1, 2, 4–6, 8, 9), keyboards (1, 2, 5–7, 9), harmonica (2), guitars (2, 3, 5–7), vocals (2, 5–9), slide guitars (3, 5), backing vocals (3, 5, 6, 9), 2nd solo guitar (9)
- Sin Quirin – guitars (2, 3, 5–8), 1st solo guitar (9)
- Jason Christopher – bass (2, 3, 5, 8, 9)
- DJ Swamp – turntables (1, 2, 5, 6)
- John Bechdel – keyboards (2, 3, 9)
- Roy Mayorga – drums (3, 8, 9)
- Tony Campos – bass (6, 7)
- Cesar Soto – guitar riffs (6), siren (6), sequencer (6)

=== Additional personnel ===
- Lord of the Cello – strings (1–3)
- Burton C. Bell – backing vocals (2, 3), vocals (5), spoken words (6)
- Michael Rozon – drum programming (2, 3, 5–7, 9), backing vocals (3, 5, 6, 9), nord lead keyboards (8)
- Liz Walton – samples (2, 3, 6–9), backing vocals (3, 5, 6, 9)
- Arabian Prince – scratching (3)
- Sam Shearon – album artwork

== Charts ==
Chart (2018)	Peak position
Austrian Albums (Ö3 Austria)	73
Belgian Albums (Ultratop Flanders)	117
Belgian Albums (Ultratop Wallonia)	141
French Albums (SNEP)	189
German Albums (Offizielle Top 100)	57
Scottish Albums (OCC)	67
Swiss Albums (Schweizer Hitparade)	65
US Hard Rock Albums (Billboard)	15
US Independent Albums (Billboard)	7
US Rock Albums (Billboard)	50
US Tastemakers Albums (Billboard)	7
