= Rantology =

Remix album by Ministry
- Released: September 27, 2005
- Recorded: 1987–2005
- Genre: Industrial metal
- Length: 76:33
- Label: Sanctuary
- Producer: Al Jourgensen

Ministry chronology
Side Trax (2004)	Rantology (2005)	Rio Grande Blood (2006)

Professional ratings
Review scores
Source	Rating
AllMusic	3/5 stars
Collector's Guide to Heavy Metal	6/10
Exclaim!	no score
Pitchfork	2.0/10
PopMatters	6/10 stars
Release Magazine	5/10 stars

Rantology is a compilation album by American industrial metal band Ministry. The album is made up of remixes of the band's singles and best known songs - with the exception of track 2 ("The Great Satan") which was first released here and became a live staple.

== Track listing ==
No.	Title	Length
1.	"No W" (Redux)	4:14
2.	"The Great Satan" (Previously unreleased)	3:13
3.	"Wrong" (Update Mix)	5:21
4.	"N.W.O." (Update Mix)	5:06
5.	"Stigmata" (Update Mix)	5:09
6.	"Waiting"	5:02
7.	"Warp City"	4:01
8.	"Jesus Built My Hotrod" (Update Mix)	5:52
9.	"Bad Blood" (Alternate Mix)	5:25
10.	"Animosity"	4:36
11.	"Unsung" (Alternate Mix)	3:43
12.	"Bloodlines"	6:34
13.	"Psalm 69" (Live in Paris)	5:03
14.	"Thieves" (Live in Seattle)	5:06
15.	"The Fall" (Live in London)	8:04

- Tracks 13, 14, and 15 are live versions taken from the Sphinctour live album.

== Personnel ==
- Al Jourgensen - vocals (1–7, 9–15), guitars (1–7, 10–12), bass (2), drum programming (2), lead guitar (8), slide guitar (8, 9), production, remixing, mastering
- Mike Scaccia - guitars (1, 3–8, 12), lead guitar (1, 2, 6), bass (6)
- Martha Cooper - feature vocals (1)
- John Monte - bass (3, 7)
- Mark Baker - drums (3, 7)
- Paul Barker - bass (4, 5, 8–11, 13–14), programming (4, 5, 8–11), keyboard bass (15)
- Bill Rieflin - drums (4, 8)
- Michael Balch - programming (8)
- Gibby Haynes - vocals (8)
- Louis Svitek - guitar (9, 11, 13–15)
- Rey Washam - drums (9, 11, 13–15)
- Max Brody - drums and percussion (10, 11), programming (10)
- Adam Grossman - guitar (10)
- Zlatko Hukic - guitar (13–15)
- Duane Buford - keyboards (13–15)
- Darrell James - programming & assistant engineer
- Dave Donnelly - mastering
- Marco A. Ramirez - engineer
- Jeff Magid - compilation producer
- Paul Elledge - photography & art direction
- Tim Bruce - design
