= Moral Hygiene =

Studio album by Ministry
- Released: October 1, 2021
- Recorded: 2018–2021
- Genre: Industrial metal
- Length: 47:10
- Label: Nuclear Blast
- Producer: Al Jourgensen

Ministry studio albums chronology
| AmeriKKKant (2018) | Moral Hygiene (2021) | Hopiumforthemasses (2024) |

Singles from Moral Hygiene
- 1. "Alert Level" Released: April 24, 2020; 2. "Good Trouble" Released: July 8, 2021; 3. "Search and Destroy" Released: August 20, 2021

Professional ratings
Review scores
| Source | Rating |
|---|---|
| Blabbermouth.net | 8/10 |
| Classic Rock | 3.5/5 stars |
| Kerrang! | 4/5 stars |

Moral Hygiene is the fifteenth studio album by American industrial metal band Ministry, released on October 1, 2021. In production for about three years, following the release of AmeriKKKant (2018), this album marks the band's first collaboration with bassist Paul D'Amour (previously known as the bassist of Tool), who joined Ministry in 2019, and the first to include a cover song since Relapse (2012). Moral Hygiene also includes guest appearances from guitarist Billy Morrison, former Megadeth bassist David Ellefson, former N.W.A member Arabian Prince and Ministry frontman Al Jourgensen's former bandmate in Lard, Jello Biafra. It also marks the first album since Rio Grande Blood (2006) to not feature guitarist Sin Quirin, who quit the band in March 2021 following the previous year's allegations of underage sexual relations.

== Critical reception ==
Wall of Sound scored the album 7/10, writing that "the music is as abrasive and confrontational as ever".

=== Accolades ===
| Publication | Accolade | Rank |
|---|---|---|
| Consequence | Top 30 Metal & Hard Rock Albums | 19 |
| Loudwire | The 45 Best Rock + Metal Albums of 2021 | 34 |

== Track listing ==
All tracks written by Al Jourgensen except where noted:

Moral Hygiene track listing
| No. | Title | Writer(s) | Length |
|---|---|---|---|
| 1. | "Alert Level" | | 6:04 |
| 2. | "Good Trouble" | | 3:53 |
| 3. | "Sabotage Is Sex" | | 5:10 |
| 4. | "Disinformation" | | 4:46 |
| 5. | "Search and Destroy" | Iggy Pop; James Williamson | 4:28 |
| 6. | "Believe Me" | | 5:52 |
| 7. | "Broken System" | | 5:57 |
| 8. | "We Shall Resist" | | 4:30 |
| 9. | "Death Toll" | | 3:24 |
| 10. | "TV Song #6" (Right Around the Corner Mix) | | 3:06 |
| Total length: | | | 47:10 |

== Personnel ==
=== Ministry ===
- Al Jourgensen – lead vocals (all except 3), backing vocals, guitars (1, 2, 3, 8, 9), bass (1, 8, 9), samples, keyboards (2, 3, 5, 7, 8), harmonica (2), organ (4), acoustic guitar (6), congas (7)
- John Bechdel – keyboards (8)
- Cesar Soto – guitars (all except 5), bass (3, 7, 10)
- Paul D'Amour – bass (2)
- Roy Mayorga – drums (1)

=== Additional personnel ===
- Michael Rozon – drum programming (all except 1), backing vocals
- Liz Walton – samples, backing vocals
- Arabian Prince – scratching (1)
- Jello Biafra – lead vocals (3)
- Billy Morrison – guitars (4–6)
- David Ellefson – bass (5–6)

=== Production ===
- Al Jourgensen – production
- Michael Rozon – engineering
- Dave Donnelly – mastering
- Billy Morrison – front/back cover
- Ban Garcia – layout design
- Liz Walton – burning car photo
- Steve Davis – management
- Scott Sokol/Pinnacle – booking
- Selena Fragassi – publicist

== Charts ==
Chart performance for Moral Hygiene
| Chart (2021) | Peak position |
|---|---|
| Austrian Albums (Ö3 Austria) | 65 |
| German Albums (Offizielle Top 100) | 33 |
| Scottish Albums (OCC) | 33 |
| Swiss Albums (Schweizer Hitparade) | 64 |
| UK Independent Albums (OCC) | 10 |
| UK Rock & Metal Albums (OCC) | 7 |
