= Adios... Puta Madres =

Live album by Ministry
- Released: March 31, 2009 (CD); May 27, 2009 (DVD)
- Recorded: 2008
- Genre: Industrial metal
- Length: 67:09
- Label: 13th Planet/Megaforce
- Producer: Al Jourgensen

Ministry chronology
Cover Up (2008)	Adios... Puta Madres (2009)	The Last Dubber (2009)

Professional ratings
Review scores
Source	Rating
AllMusic	3/5 stars
KNAC	4/5 stars
Rock Sound	7/10 stars

Adios... Puta Madres is a live album by Ministry, released on March 31, 2009, on 13th Planet Records. The album was recorded at various locations on Ministry's farewell tour, dubbed the "C U LaTouR". In 2009, "Señor Peligro" was nominated for a Grammy Award in the category of Best Metal Performance for the 52nd Grammy Awards.

== Track listing ==
No.	Title	Length
1.	"Let's Go"	5:08
2.	"Watch Yourself"	5:14
3.	"Life Is Good"	4:20
4.	"The Dick Song"	5:43
5.	"The Last Sucker"	6:30
6.	"No W"	3:01
7.	"Waiting"	5:11
8.	"Worthless"	4:18
9.	"Wrong"	5:14
10.	"Rio Grande Blood"	4:34
11.	"Señor Peligro"	3:50
12.	"LiesLiesLies"	5:21
13.	"Khyber Pass"	8:46

== DVD ==
The DVD release consists of two discs and contains additional songs and bonus features, including a tour documentary entitled "Fuchi Requiem".

=== Track listing ===
No.	Title	Length
1.	"Let's Go"
2.	"The Last Sucker"
3.	"Waiting"
4.	"Worthless"
5.	"LiesLiesLies"
6.	"Watch Yourself"
7.	"Life Is Good"
8.	"No W"
9.	"Rio Grande Blood"
10.	"Señor Peligro"
11.	"So What"
12.	"N.W.O."
13.	"Just One Fix"
14.	"Thieves"
15.	"What a Wonderful World"

== Personnel ==
=== Ministry ===
- Al Jourgensen – vocals, guitars, production, mixing
- Sin Quirin – guitars
- Tommy Victor – guitars
- Tony Campos – bass
- John Bechdel – keyboards
- Aaron Rossi – drums

=== Additional personnel ===
- Michihiro Tanikawa – mixing, live sound recording
- John Billberry – engineering
- Dave Donnelly – mastering
- Steffan Chirazi – photography
- Bruce Biegler – photography
- Lawton Outlaw – art direction & design
