= Surgical Meth Machine =

Studio album by Surgical Meth Machine
- Released: April 15, 2016
- Genres: Industrial metal, speed metal, psychedelic rock
- Length: 39:59
- Label: Nuclear Blast
- Producers: Al Jourgensen, Sammy D'Ambruoso

Singles from Surgical Meth Machine
- 1. "Tragic Alert" Released: February 27, 2016; 2. "I'm Invisible" Released: April 2, 2016; 3. "I Don't Wanna" Released: April 11, 2016

Surgical Meth Machine is an industrial metal album by Al Jourgensen's project of the same name. It was released on April 15, 2016. The album was conceived by Jourgensen and engineer Sammy D'Ambruoso as a tribute to the late guitarist Mike Scaccia, who Jourgensen called "probably the best shredder guitar player who walked this planet" – to this end, the project was planned to resemble the song "Side FX Include Mikey's Middle Finger (TV 4)" from From Beer to Eternity, with all songs clocking over at least 220 beats per minute. The project changed direction, however, when Jourgensen moved from Texas to California and got a medical marijuana card; according to Jourgensen, after this, "the record seemed to slow down considerably."

== Track listing ==
All songs written by Surgical Meth Machine except track 8 by Deborah Smith, Gerald V. Casale, Mark Mothersbaugh and Susan Schmidt.

No.	Title	Length
1.	"I'm Sensitive"	4:10
2.	"Tragic Alert"	3:36
3.	"I Want More"	3:51
4.	"Rich People Problems"	3:06
5.	"I Don't Wanna" (feat. Jello Biafra)	3:19
6.	"Smash and Grab"	2:49
7.	"Unlistenable"	4:54
8.	"Gates of Steel" (Devo cover)	2:46
9.	"Spudnik"	2:33
10.	"Just Go Home"	2:51
11.	"Just Keep Going"	1:03
12.	"I'm Invisible"	5:01

== Personnel ==
- Al Jourgensen – lead vocals, guitars, bass
- Sammy D'Ambruoso – rhythm guitar, programming, engineer, vocals
- Betty X, Jello Biafra and Sabina Koenig – additional vocals
- Steve Davis – management
- Dave Donnelly – mastering
- Eric Lothrop – photography
- Ben Garcia – artwork
