= Clayton Worbeck =

- Born: Clayton Worbeck; Canada
- Genres: Industrial rock, alternative rock, electronic music, electronic dance music, industrial metal, new wave
- Occupations: Composer, remixer, musician, songwriter, sound designer, producer
- Instruments: Guitar, keyboards, synthesizer, programmer
- Years active: 1997–present
- Labels: Nefer Records, 13th Planet Records, Megaforce, Pulse Recording, Nuclear Blast
- Formerly of: Stayte, Revolting Cocks
- Website: www.claytonworbeck.com

Clayton Worbeck is a Canadian multi-instrumentalist, film composer, producer, engineer and remixer. He is the guitarist/programmer for Stayte and has remixed tracks for Filter, Ministry, IAMX, Revolting Cocks, Prong and others.

== Stayte ==
The industrial rock band Stayte was co-founded by guitarist/programmer Clayton and singer/lyricist Joshua Bradford in 1997. They released Growing Pains on Nefer Records in 1999. After this release, Worbeck took over the bulk of the recording, mixing and producing duties for the band. Along with Bradford, they recorded and released Abandon in the Amber in 2003. They collaborated in 2005 with Ministry's Paul Barker on an EP titled Cognitive Dissonance – The Art of Lying to Yourself. Originally destined for a 2008 release on 13th Planet, The Two Sisters was finally released in 2010 on Spiralchords in Europe and independently in North America.

== Revolting Cocks ==
Both Worbeck and Bradford joined the Revolting Cocks in 2006 for the MasterbaTour – Worbeck as the live keyboardist and Bradford as the lead singer. Shortly after the tour concluded founding member Al Jourgensen made Worbeck, Bradford and Sin Quirin official members of the Revolting Cocks. Worbeck contributed programming and keyboards to the last two Revolting Cocks studio albums – Sex-O Olympic-O and Got Cock?. He also remixed nine tracks on Cocktail Mixxx and two tracks on Sex-O MiXXX-O – one with Joshua Bradford and one as Stayte. He played keyboards and guitar on the 2009 LubricaTour.

== Ministry ==
Worbeck began working with Ministry in 2007. Outside of one remix by John Bechdel, he remixed the entire Rio Grande Dub release. In 2008, he contributed keyboards to Ministry's cover of "Bang A Gong" from the album Cover Up. His remix of Ministry's "Death and Destruction" appeared on the Saw V Original Motion Picture Soundtrack. In 2008/2009, he remixed the first ten tracks of The Last Dubber.

== Prong ==
Prong's Power of the Damn Mixxxer featured Worbeck's remix of "The Banishment". Worbeck also remixed "Power of the Damager".

== Filter ==
In 2008, Worbeck remixed the first three tracks on Filter's digital-only release Remixes for the Damned. Two years later, Worbeck completed two remixes for Filter's The Trouble with Angels. His remix of "The Inevitable Relapse" is on the deluxe edition of the US release. His remix of "Drug Boy" is available on the European version released through Nuclear Blast.

== Composing for Film ==
Beyond the Ministry remix for Saw V Original Motion Picture Soundtrack, Worbeck began scoring for feature films in 2012 when he collaborated with Joshua Bradford on the psychological thriller Dead Within. He has since composed the music for several award-winning feature films including Ctrl Alt Delete (2016), Like Cotton Twines (2016), Island Zero (2017) and Ditched (2021).

== Discography ==
- Stayte – Growing Pains (1999)
- Stayte – Abandon in the Amber (2003)
- Simple Shelter – Phoenix From The Ashes (2005)
- Revolting Cocks – Cocktail Mixxx (2007)
- Ministry – Rio Grande Dub (2007)
- Stayte – Cognitive Dissonance (The Art of Lying To Yourself) (2007)
- Simple Shelter – All Is One (2008)
- Ministry – Cover Up (2008)
- Saw V Original Motion Picture Soundtrack (2008)
- Filter – Remixes for the Damned (2008)
- Revolting Cocks – Sex-O Olympic-O (2009)
- Prong – Power of the Damn Mixxxer (2009)
- Ministry – The Last Dubber (2009)
- Revolting Cocks – Sex-O MiXXX-O (2009)
- Revolting Cocks – Got Cock? (2010)
- Stayte – The Two Sisters (2010)
- Filter – The Trouble with Angels (2010)
- IAMX – Volatile Times Remix EP (2011)
