= ¿Got Cock? =

Studio album by Revolting Cocks
- Released: April 13, 2010
- Recorded: 2009
- Genre: Industrial metal, industrial rock
- Length: 53:31
- Label: 13th Planet, Megaforce
- Producer: Al Jourgensen

Revolting Cocks chronology
Sex-O MiXXX-O (2009)	¿Got Cock? (2010)	¿Got Mixxx? (2011)

Professional ratings
Review scores
Source	Rating
AllMusic	3.5/5 stars

¿Got Cock? is the sixth studio album by the Revolting Cocks released on April 13, 2010, through 13th Planet Records.

== Track listing ==
No.	Title	Length
1.	"Trojan Horse"	6:15
2.	"Filthy Señoritas"	4:48
3.	"Dykes"	6:41
4.	"Juice"	4:51
5.	"Piss Army"	4:30
6.	"Fuck Money"	3:57
7.	"Bitch Addictive"	4:47
8.	"Air Traffic Control"	3:38
9.	"Poke-a-Hot-Ass"	4:21
10.	"Me So Horny" (2 Live Crew cover)	4:33
11.	"Me So Horny" (Remix)	5:10
Total length:		53:31

== Personnel ==
=== RevCo ===
- Josh Bradford - lead vocals
- Al Jourgensen - keyboards, programming, background vocals, production
- Sin Quirin - guitars, bass, keyboards
- Clayton Worbeck - programming, audio remix (11)

=== Additional personnel ===
- Sammy D'Ambruoso - drum programming
- Isa Martinez - background vocals
- Mark Thwaite - guitar (2)
