= Cover Up (Ministry album) =

Compilation album by Ministry and Co-Conspirators
- Released: April 1, 2008
- Recorded: 2007 at 13th Planet Studios, El Paso, Texas
- Genres: Industrial metal, thrash metal
- Length: 61:15
- Label: 13th Planet
- Producer: Al Jourgensen

Ministry and Co-Conspirators chronology
The Last Sucker (2007)	Cover Up (2008)	Adios... Puta Madres (2009)

Professional ratings
Review scores
Source	Rating
About.com	3.5/5 stars
AllMusic	3.5/5 stars
Alternative Press	3/5 stars
Pitchfork	7.5/10
Sputnikmusic	2.5/5

Cover Up is a compilation album of cover songs by Ministry (officially credited as Ministry and Co-Conspirators), released on April 1, 2008. The album includes previously released covers "Roadhouse Blues", "Lay Lady Lay", and "Supernaut". Cover Up was intended to be Ministry's final release before their three-year breakup from 2008 to 2011.

On December 3, 2008, "Under My Thumb" was nominated for a Grammy Award in the category of Best Metal Performance in 2009. It lost to "My Apocalypse" by Metallica.

== Track listing ==
No.	Title	Original artist	Length
1.	"Under My Thumb"	The Rolling Stones	3:58
2.	"Bang a Gong (Get It On)"	T. Rex	4:48
3.	"Radar Love"	Golden Earring	5:21
4.	"Space Truckin'"	Deep Purple	3:51
5.	"Black Betty"	Lead Belly	3:21
6.	"Mississippi Queen"	Mountain	3:14
7.	"Just Got Paid"	ZZ Top	3:13
8.	"Roadhouse Blues"	The Doors	4:27
9.	"Supernaut"	Black Sabbath	7:08
10.	"Lay, Lady, Lay"	Bob Dylan	5:44
11.	"What a Wonderful World"	Louis Armstrong	7:01
23.	"What a Wonderful World" (Short Slow Version)		4:17
44.	"What a Wonderful World" (Short Fast Version)		3:35
69.	"Willie Stigmata" (sung by anonymous fan, affecting a Willie Nelson voice)		1:04

Cover Up Japanese edition extra track
No.	Title	Original artist	Length
10.	"I Want You (She's So Heavy)"	The Beatles	4:42

- Tracks 1–7 and 11 were previously unreleased (2008)
- Track 8 previously appeared on the Ministry release The Last Sucker (2007)
- Track 9 previously appeared on the 1000 Homo DJs release "Supernaut" (1990)
- Track 10 previously appeared on the Ministry release Filth Pig (1996)

== Personnel ==
- Al Jourgensen – string arrangements (1, 11, 23, 44), horn arrangements (1–3), pedal steel guitar (1, 10), background vocals (1, 3, 4), lead guitar (2), B3 organ (3–5), keyboards (4), vocals (5, 7–11, 23, 44), programming (6, 8, 9), guitars (6, 8–10), slide guitar (7), harmonica (8), bass (9), harpsichord (11, 23, 44), drum programming, additional programming, production
- Sin Quirin – lead guitar (1, 5, 8), guitars (1–7, 11, 23, 44), bass (2–7, 11, 23, 44)
- Burton C. Bell – vocals (1)
- Tony Campos – bass (1)
- Josh Bradford – vocals (2, 3)
- Clayton Worbeck – keyboards (2)
- Thomas M. Victor – vocals (4, 6), lead guitar (4, 6), guitar (8)
- Hell Paso Mosh Choir – background vocals (5)
- Paul Raven – bass (8)
- Casey Chaos – intro vocals (8)
- John S. Bilberry – drum programming (8), additional programming, engineering
- Paul Barker – bass (10)
- Jeff Ward – drums (9)
- Mike Scaccia – guitar (9)
- Rey Washam – drums (10)
- Louis Svitek – guitar (10)
- Edu Mussi – piano (11, 23)
- Alejandro Rosso – background vocals (11, 23, 44)
- Juan José González – background vocals (11, 23, 44)
- Samuel D'Ambruoso III – drum programming
- Dave Donnely – mastering
- Lawton Outlaw – art direction, design, layout
