= LiesLiesLies =

Song by Ministry

Song by Ministry

from the album Rio Grande Blood
- Released: August 21, 2006
- Recorded: 2005
- Studio: 13th Planet Studios in El Paso, Texas
- Genre: Industrial metal, thrash metal
- Length: 5:16
- Label: 13th Planet, Megaforce
- Songwriter(s): Al Jourgensen, Tommy Victor
- Producer(s): Al Jourgensen

"LiesLiesLies" is a Grammy-nominated song by American industrial metal band Ministry. The song is the fifth track on the band's tenth studio album, Rio Grande Blood. The audio samples in the song are from the documentary Loose Change.

== Style ==
The song is one of the band's fastest songs, with AllMusic reviewer David Jeffries describing the song as being "thrash-punk".

== Music video ==
A music video was produced for the song and was directed by Zach Passero

The video begins with a young boy watching a TV screen with animated soldiers marching. The boys gets up and runs out the room, with Jourgensen appearing right outside the window. The video cuts to the band performing the song in a room before cutting to a group of women dancing on tops of TVs during the pre-chorus of the song. The video briefly cuts back to the boy, who is watching then president George W. Bush while eating dinner with his family. The video goes back to the band performing and shows the women dancing again. At the song's chorus, Jourgensen appears again outside the dining room window, with a nuclear explosion going off in the background and the family hides under the table.

The TV cuts to a scene of a reporter talking about how "America has been hijacked" and pictures of George W. Bush and Dick Cheney flashing across the screen (a reference to the song No W). The video shows the family sitting together in the living room, going on about their daily lives. Another explosion occurs with Jourgensen walking by outside. As the family takes cover, the boy from the beginning of the video (now a man) decides to take action and enlists in the Army. The video ends with the young boy/man marching away with the same Army shown at the beginning.

== Awards ==
The song was nominated for Best Metal Performance at the 49th Annual Grammy Awards, but lost to "Eyes of the Insane" by Slayer.

== In popular culture ==
- The song is featured in the 2007 film Battle for Haditha.
- The song is available as downloadable content for the video game Rock Band 2.

== Personnel ==
Ministry

- Al Jourgensen – vocals, guitars, keyboards, production
- Tommy Victor – guitars
- Paul Raven – bass

Additional personnel

- Mark Baker – drums
