= Keys to the City (song) =

Song by Ministry

Single by Ministry & Co Conspirators
- Released: 5 March 2008
- Recorded: 2007
- Length: 4:22
- Label: 13th Planet
- Songwriters: Al Jourgensen; Joshua Bradford; Paul Raven
- Producer: Hypo Luxa

Ministry & Co Conspirators singles chronology
"Let's Go" (2007)	"Keys to the City" (2008)	"Thunderstruck" (2010)

"Keys to the City" is a song from American industrial metal band Ministry, in collaboration with "Co-Conspirators", as a gift for the Chicago Blackhawks ice hockey team. The song was written by Al Jourgensen (Ministry, Revolting Cocks), Joshua Bradford (Revolting Cocks) and Paul Raven (Killing Joke, Ministry).

== History ==
The song was written in late 2007 and was presented as a gift to the Chicago Blackhawks ice hockey team and the Wirtz Family, owners of the Chicago Blackhawks, in December 2007. In late February 2008, the song was embraced by the Chicago Blackhawks as a companion song to "Here Come the Hawks," the Blackhawks' official theme song.

The song is available as a download from iTunes as of March 5, 2008—proceeds benefit the Blackhawks Charities. Jourgensen traveled to Chicago to celebrate the song's release, participated in media interviews, and was honored at the March 5, 2008 home game between the Chicago Blackhawks and the Anaheim Ducks. The song was Ministry's final release before Jourgensen retired the band in May 2008 (although the band reformed in August 2011).

The song was remixed by Revolting Cocks and featured in the band's 2009 release Sex-O Olympic-O as "Keys to the City (Vegas Mix)". "Keys to the City" was then included in the soundtrack of the ice hockey video game NHL 10, published by EA Sports—the game was released on September 15, 2009 and featured Patrick Kane, the Blackhawks star forward, on its cover art.

== Track listing ==
No.	Title	Length
1.	"Keys to the City"	4:22

== Personnel ==
- Josh Bradford: vocals, backing vocals
- Al Jourgensen: guitars, programming, backing vocals
- Sin Quirin: guitars
- Paul Raven: bass
- Clayton Worbeck: keyboards
- John Billberry: drum programming
