= Cocktail Mixxx =

Remix album by Revolting Cocks
- Released: March 6, 2007
- Recorded: 2004–2005, 2006
- Studio: Sonic Ranch and 13th Planet Studios, El Paso, Texas
- Genre: Industrial metal
- Length: 53:01
- Label: 13th Planet, Megaforce
- Producer: Al Jourgensen; Clayton Worbeck

Revolting Cocks chronology
Cocked and Loaded (2006)	Cocktail Mixxx (2007)	Sex-O Olympic-O (2009)

Professional ratings
Review scores
Source	Rating
AllMusic	2.5/5 stars

Cocktail Mixxx is a remix album released on March 6, 2007 by the Revolting Cocks on 13th Planet Records. All of the original songs can be found on the band's previous album, Cocked and Loaded, and are remixed in their order of appearance on the promotional issue of that album, with "Fire Engine" having a second remix appear at the end. Original member Luc van Acker and longtime contributor Phildo Owens remixed a track each on the record, but the other nine tracks were remixed by Clayton Worbeck. The second remix of "Fire Engine" features Josh Bradford on vocals.

== Track listing ==
No.	Title	Length
1.	"Fire Engine" (Gumby Mixxx)	5:08
2.	"Ten Million Ways to Die" (Jammin the Radar Mix)	4:22
3.	"Calienté" (Searing Social Problem Mix)	4:53
4.	"Prune Tang" (Prune Juice Cocktail Mixx)	3:12
5.	"Dead End Streets" (86 Mix)	5:51
6.	"Pole Grinder" (It Hurts When I Piss Mix)	6:11
7.	"Jack in the Crack" (Crackrock Mix)	3:40
8.	"Devil Cock" (Sum Yunguy Mix)	4:00
9.	"Viagra Culture" (Fat Juicy Hog Mix)	7:29
10.	"Revolting Cock Au Lait" (Le Coq Au Lait Mix)	4:27
11.	"Fire Engine" (Stayte of the Nation Mix)	3:48
Total length:		53:01

== Personnel ==
- See original album credits to Cocked and Loaded
- Clayton Worbeck - remixing (2–4, 6–11)
- Luc van Acker - remixing (1, 5)
- Phildo Owens - remixing (5)
- Josh Bradford - vocals (11)
