= The Last Dubber =

Remix album by Ministry
- Released: September 15, 2009
- Recorded: 2007
- Genre: Industrial metal
- Label: 13th Planet
- Producer: Al Jourgensen

Ministry chronology
Adios... Puta Madres (2009)	The Last Dubber (2009)	MiXXXes of the Molé (2010)

Professional ratings
Review scores
Source	Rating
Allmusic	2.5/5 stars

The Last Dubber is a remix album by industrial metal band Ministry released on September 15, 2009. The album is composed of remixes from the band's 2007 album The Last Sucker.

== Track listing ==
No.	Title	Length
1.	"Let’s Go" (La Fin Du Monde Mix)	5:56
2.	"Watch Yourself" (The Clocks Strike Thirteen Mix)	4:29
3.	"Life is Good" (Neuroplasticity Mix)	6:27
4.	"The Dick Song" (Straight Outta Lincoln Mix)	4:47
5.	"The Last Sucker" (Icke Mix)	3:44
6.	"No Glory" (Sandpaper Condom Mix)	4:49
7.	"Death & Destruction" (A Vote of Non-Confidence Mix)	5:09
8.	"Die in a Crash" (Point of Impact Mix)	5:22
9.	"End of Days Part 1" (One Less Sparrow Mix)	5:02
10.	"End of Days Part 2" (Extreme Mayan Makeover Mix)	4:50
11.	"Let’s Go" (Dawn of Oblivion Mix)	4:38
12.	"The Last Sucker" (Hardware Revamp Mix)	8:52

== Personnel ==
- See original album credits to The Last Sucker
- Clayton Worbeck - Remixing and additional programming and production (tracks 1–10)
- John Bechdel - Remixing (track 11)
- DJ Hardware - Remixing (track 12)
