= Sex-O MiXXX-O =

Remix album by Revolting Cocks
- Released: September 29, 2009
- Recorded: 2007–2008
- Studio: 13th Planet Studios, El Paso, Texas
- Genre: Industrial metal
- Length: 46:48
- Label: 13th Planet, Megaforce
- Producer: Al Jourgensen, Chris Kniker (Executive Producer)

Revolting Cocks chronology
Sex-O Olympic-O (2009)	Sex-O MiXXX-O (2009)	¿Got Cock? (2010)

Professional ratings
Review scores
Source	Rating
AllMusic	3.5/5 stars

Sex-O MiXXX-O is a remix album released on September 29, 2009, by the Revolting Cocks on 13th Planet Records. All of the original songs can be found on the band's previous album, Sex-O Olympic-O.

== Track listing ==
Sex-O MiXXX-O
No.	Title	Length
1.	"HookerBot3000 (Tweaker mix) [Remixed by Chris Vrenna of Tweaker and Marilyn Manson]"	3:47
2.	"Keys To The City (Invincible mix) [Remixed by Crabbi of Vileevils & Pop Will Eat Itself]"	5:20
3.	"Red Parrot (Juarez Tunnel mix) [Remixed by MegaJive]"	4:18
4.	"Robo Bandidos (A Chilling Effect mix) [Remixed by Doug Firley of Gravity Kills]"	3:50
5.	"Cousins (Sexy Problems = Sexy Solutions mix) [Remixed by Clayton Worbeck and Josh Bradford of Revolting Cocks]"	5:18
6.	"Touch Screen (Shower Strangulation mix) [Remixed by Luc van Acker]"	3:59
7.	"I’m Not Gay (I'm So Gay Club mix) [Remixed by Dave “Rave” Ogilvie of Skinny Puppy]"	4:37
8.	"Abundant Redundancy (Clockworks and Cold Steel mix) [Remixed by Clayton Worbeck of Stayte]"	5:22
9.	"Lewd Ferrigno (Club On mix) [Remixed by Andy LaPlegua of Combichrist]"	5:53
10.	"Wizard of Sextown (Bisected Banshee mix) [Remixed by Seismologist]"	4:27
11.	"I’m Not Gay (Prison Ready mix) [Remixed by Blownload]"	5:09
12.	"Touch Screen (Camperized Cargo Van mix) [Remixed by Clayton Worbeck]"	4:56
13.	"Wizard Of Sextown (Redlight District mix) [Remixed by Clayton Worbeck]"	7:58
14.	"Abundant Redundancy (Dambuster Metalmorphosis mix) [Remixed by Mark Thwaite]"	6:06
15.	"Cousins (Dirty Little Secret mix) [Remixed by ReVamp]"	10:19

== Personnel ==
- See original album credits to Sex-O Olympic-O
