= Rio Grande Dub =

Remix album by Ministry
- Released: July 10, 2007
- Recorded: 2006
- Genre: Industrial metal
- Label: 13th Planet
- Producer: Al Jourgensen, Clayton Worbeck, John Bechdel

Ministry chronology
Rio Grande Blood (2006)	Rio Grande Dub (2007)	The Last Sucker (2007)

Professional ratings
Review scores
Source	Rating
AllMusic	3.5/5 stars

Rio Grande Dub, alternatively titled Rio Grande Dub-Ya, is a remix album by industrial metal band Ministry. The album is composed of remixes from the band's 2006 album Rio Grande Blood. John Bechdel produced the remix "Fear Is Big Business (Weapons of Mass Deception Mix)". The rest of the remixes on this album were done by Clayton Worbeck.

== Track listing ==
No.	Title	Length
1.	"Rio Grande Blood" (Rio Grande Dub Ya Mix)	4:12
2.	"Señor Peligro" (La Zona Peligrosa Mix)	4:08
3.	"Gangreen" (Kiss Me Goodnight Mix)	3:35
4.	"Fear Is Big Business" (Weapons of Mass Deception Mix)	3:42
5.	"Lieslieslies" (Cognitive Dissonance Mix)	4:19
6.	"The Great Satan" (What Would Satan Do? Mix)	3:06
7.	"Yellow Cake" (Hexafluoride Mix)	4:22
8.	"Palestina" (72nd Virgin Mix)	5:23
9.	"Ass Clown" (Osama McDonald Mix)	3:31
10.	"Khyber Pass" (TX Bush Ranch Mix)	4:27
11.	"Lieslieslies" (Known Unknown Lies Mix)	3:55
12.	"Fear Is Big Business" (USA Inc. Mix)	3:28

- Track 12 is a Japan-only bonus track
