= Live! You Goddamned Son of a Bitch =

Live album by Revolting Cocks
- Released: 1988
- Recorded: September 4, 1987
- Venues: Cabaret Metro, Chicago
- Genre: Industrial rock
- Length: 73:32
- Label: Wax Trax!
- Producers: Hypo Luxa, Hermes Pan

Revolting Cocks chronology
Big Sexy Land (1986)	Live! You Goddamned Son of a Bitch (1988)	Beers, Steers, and Queers (1990)

Professional ratings
Review scores
Source	Rating
AllMusic	3.5/5 stars
MusicHound Rock	3.5/5 stars
Spin	no score

Live! You Goddamned Son of a Bitch is a concert album and video by the Revolting Cocks, consisting of live material recorded at the Cabaret Metro in Chicago, on September 4, 1987. However, Al Jourgensen has claimed in his autobiography, that the whole concert was re-recorded in Trax studio in Chicago afterwards. According to Jourgensen both Paul Barker and Chris Connelly thought the live record sounded horrible and they refused to release the original audio recording of the show. Jourgensen thought the recording was perfect but later agreed with Barker and Connelly. It is their second LP release following Big Sexy Land.

== Track listing ==
=== Original album ===
No.	Title	Length
1.	"You Goddamned Son of a Bitch"	4:50
2.	"Cattle Grind"	5:58
3.	"We Shall Cleanse The World"	7:09
4.	"38"	4:34
5.	"In The Neck"	5:32
6.	"You Often Forget"	8:50
7.	"T.V. Mind"	7:53
8.	"Union Carbide"	8:49
9.	"Attack Ships On Fire"	7:38
10.	"No Devotion"	12:19
Total length:		73:32

=== 2004 reissue ===
==== Disc 1 ====
No.	Title	Writer(s)	Length
1.	"You Goddamned Son of a Bitch"	Jourgensen	4:50
2.	"Cattle Grind"	Jourgensen, Barker, Connelly, Rieflin, Van Acker	5:58
3.	"We Shall Cleanse the World"	Jourgensen	7:09
4.	"38"	Jourgensen	4:34
5.	"In The Neck"	Jourgensen, Barker, Connelly, Van Acker, Rieflin	5:32
6.	"You Often Forget"	Jourgensen	8:50
7.	"T.V. Mind"	Jourgensen	7:53
Total length:			44:46

==== Disc 2 ====
No.	Title	Writer(s)	Length
1.	"Union Carbide"	Jourgensen	8:49
2.	"Attack Ships On Fire"	Jourgensen	7:38
3.	"No Devotion"	Jourgensen	12:19
4.	"Stainless Steel Providers" (Live in The Great State of Texas 1990; from 12")	Jourgensen, Barker, Connelly, Van Acker, Rieflin	8:04
5.	"Public Image" (Live in The Great State of Texas 1990; from 12")	Public Image Ltd	2:51
Total length:			39:41

== Personnel ==
=== Revolting Cocks ===
- Alain Jourgensen - keyboards (2, 5, 8), vocals (3, 4, 10), backing vocals (6, 7), guitar (9), production
- Luc van Acker - guitar (1, 2, 5, 6, 8), bass guitar (3, 4), percussion (6), vocals (7, 9), keyboards (10)
- Chris Connelly - vocals (1, 2, 5–7), keyboards (3, 4, 8–10)
- Paul Barker - bass guitar (2, 5, 8–10), keyboards (3, 4, 6, 7), production
- William Rieflin - drums

=== Additional personnel ===
- Steve Speperi - engineer
- Julian Herzfeld - engineer
- Tim Powell - recording
- Brian Shanley - cover design
- Tom Young - cover photography

=== Video personnel ===
- Louanne Ponder - dancing
- Gina Tubetop - dancing
- Tommy (The Mix) Nix - live sound
- Timo Antilla - director
- Dave Anderson - editor
- David Collins - stage lighting
- Frank Nardiello - stage lighting
- Dave Anderson - video paint FX

=== 2004 re-issue bonus tracks ===
- Chris Connelly - vocals
- Alien Jourgensen - keyboards ("Stainless Steel Providers"), guitar ("P.I.L.")
- Paul Barker - bass guitar
- William Rieflin - drums
- Mike Scaccia - guitar
- Martin Atkins - drums
- Terry Roberts - guitar
- William Tucker - guitar
