= DethRok =

American musician

- Born: April 20, 1969 (age 56) Geneva, New York, U.S.
- Genres: Death rock, trip hop, industrial, psychedelic
- Occupation(s): Musician, songwriter
- Instrument(s): Vocals, guitar, synthesizer, bass, drum machine
- Years active: 2007–present
- Labels: Nuclear Blast, 13th Planet Records, Fat Possum Records, GraveStone Records
- Website: www.dethrok.com

Aaron Havill (born April 20, 1969), known professionally as "DethRok", is an American music producer, engineer, singer and songwriter. His studio credits include work with Dax Riggs & Ministry. His first album Us & Them was released in 2013 on 13th Planet Records. It was recorded in residence at Al Jourgensen's El Paso compound, where he remained for the recording of Ministry's From Beer to Eternity, Enjoy the Quiet: Live at Wacken, & Last Tangle in Paris live DVD.

On Halloween 2014, DethRok released a second album NOT DED YET along with a mixtape version, NOT DED YET TOO, including a cover of the Chelsea Wolfe song Halfsleeper. What Could Go Wrong was released on Halloween 2015 in advance of an album by the same name. In 2017, a preview of more songs from the new album was released titled What Went Wrong MixtaEP.

DethRok released a cover of Leonard Cohen's "Everybody Knows" on Sept. 14, 2020.
