= Bikers Welcome Ladies Drink Free =

Studio album by Buck Satan and the 666 Shooters
- Released: December 27, 2011
- Recorded: 2011
- Length: 50:24
- Labels: 13th Planet; AFM
- Producer: Buck Satan

Professional ratings
Review scores
Source	Rating
AllMusic	3.5/5 stars
Spin	3/10

Bikers Welcome Ladies Drink Free is the only album from Buck Satan and the 666 Shooters, an American alternative country group led by Al Jourgensen as a side project from his main band Ministry. The record was released in 2011 through Jourgensen's label 13th Planet Records, and is mostly original songs with a few covers of country-rock tunes from the 1960s and '70s.

Jourgensen calls the musical style Country-core / heavy Western and mixes fiddles, banjos, harmonicas, and drum machines with comical lyrics performed by his alias, Buck Satan.

== Track listing ==
All tracks are written by Al Jourgensen, except for where noted.

No.	Title	Writer(s)	Length
1.	"Quicker Than Liquor"		3:10
2.	"What's Wrong with Me"	Jourgensen, Scaccia	4:19
3.	"Medication Nation"		4:34
4.	"Drug Store Truck Drivin' Man (The Byrds cover)"	Roger McGuinn, Gram Parsons	4:31
5.	"The Only Time I'm Sober Is When You're Gone (Heartsfield cover)"	Perry Jordan, Phil Lucafo	3:21
6.	"Cheap Wine, Cheap Ramen"		4:11
7.	"Down the Drain"	Jourgensen, Scaccia	4:35
8.	"Sleepless Nights and Bar Room Fights"	Jourgensen, Scaccia	2:53
9.	"Friend of the Devil (Grateful Dead cover)"	John Dawson, Jerry Garcia, Robert Hunter	4:25
10.	"Ten Long Years in Texas"	Jourgensen, Scaccia	4:30
11.	"I Hate Every Bone in Your Body Except Mine"		5:18
12.	"Take Me Away"	Jourgensen, Scaccia	4:37
13.	"Dignity"	Jourgensen, Scaccia	4:54

== Personnel ==
=== Buck Satan and the 666 Shooters ===
- Buck Satan – vocals, lyrics, acoustic guitar, mandolin, banjo, harmonica, pedal steel guitar, keyboards, production, mixing
- Mike Scaccia – lead guitar, electric guitar, acoustic guitar, banjo, resonator guitar
- Rick Nielsen – lead guitar, electric guitar
- Tony Campos – bass
- JoBird – fiddle
- Margaret Lejeune – cello
- Sammy D’Ambruoso – drum programming, engineer

=== Satan's Helpers ===
- Andrew Davidson – engineer, drum programming on "What's Wrong With Me"
- Barry Kooda – baritone vox on "I Hate Every Bone In Your Body Except Mine"
- Dave Barnett – stand up bass on "Cheap Wine, Cheap Ramen"
