= No W =

Song by Ministry

Single by Ministry

from the album Houses of the Molé
- Released: 2004
- Genre: Industrial metal, thrash metal
- Length: 3:24
- Label: Sanctuary
- Songwriter(s): Al Jourgensen
- Producer(s): Al Jourgensen

Ministry singles chronology
"Piss" (2003)	"No W" (2004)	"Keys to the City" (2007)

"No W" is a single by industrial metal band Ministry. The song was the first single from their 2004 album, Houses of the Molé. The song received comparisons to the band's previous single "N.W.O." from Psalm 69: The Way to Succeed and the Way to Suck Eggs due to the songs' having similar titles and lyrical themes and being the opening track on their respective albums.

== Versions ==
Another version of this song appears on later versions of the album. This "redux" version is 2:55 in length, and has all of the samples from Carl Orff's "Carmina Burana" removed. This version of the song is featured on the video games Need for Speed: Underground 2 and Tony Hawk's Underground 2; though the version featured in the latter retains the George W. Bush speech at the beginning, the former does not. The Redux version also features a guitar solo toward the end which the other does not.

== Music video ==
The music video features an actor dancing while wearing a crude George W. Bush mask, while the members of Ministry, wearing arabian threads, play in a desert with a choir chanting "O Fortuna" in the background.

== Track listing ==
No.	Title	Length
1.	"No W" (album version)	3:24

== Personnel ==
Ministry

- Al Jourgensen – vocals, rhythm guitar, bass, programming
- Mike Scaccia – lead guitar

Additional musicians

- Rey Washam – drums
