= Beers, Steers, and Queers =

Beers, Steers + Queers

Studio album by Revolting Cocks
- Released: May 1990
- Recorded: 1987–1990
- Studio: Chicago Trax Studios
- Genres: Industrial, industrial rock
- Length: 56:40
- Label: Wax Trax!
- Producers: Al Jourgensen; Paul Barker

Revolting Cocks chronology
Live! You Goddamned Son of a Bitch (1988)	Beers, Steers + Queers (1990)	Linger Ficken' Good (1993)

Professional ratings
Review scores
Source	Rating
AllMusic	4.5/5 stars
Cash Box	favourable
MusicHound Rock	3/5 stars
Select	3/5 stars

Beers, Steers + Queers (stylized as BEERS, STEERS + QVEERS: THE ALBVM) is the second studio album by American–Belgian industrial rock band Revolting Cocks. Released in May 1990, the album was supported by three singles and was reissued several times. Its sound is industrial and built upon repetitive percussion and samples. David Jeffries of AllMusic described Beers, Steers + Queers as dominating college radio and clubs. The album's supporting tour was recalled by Chris Connelly as "ridiculous" and particularly chaotic.

== Track listing ==
=== Original album ===
No.	Title	Length
1.	"Beers, Steers & Queers"	6:03
2.	"(Let's Get) Physical" (cover of Olivia Newton-John's "Physical")	4:21
3.	"In the Neck"	5:34
4.	"Get Down" (*)	13:42
5.	"Stainless Steel Providers"	5:53
6.	"Can't Sit Still"	5:35
7.	"Something Wonderful"	4:38
8.	"Razor's Edge"	4:45
Total length:		50:31

CD bonus track
No.	Title	Length
9.	"(Let's Talk) Physical"	6:52

- (*) The LP version is 7:02.

=== 2004 reissue ===
No.	Title	Length
1.	"Beers, Steers & Queers"	5:58
2.	"(Let's Get) Physical"	4:17
3.	"In the Neck"	5:33
4.	"Cattle Grind" (Studio Mix)	4:42
5.	"Stainless Steel Providers"	5:50
6.	"Something Wonderful"	4:33
7.	"Can't Sit Still"	5:33
8.	"At the Top"	6:24
9.	"Razor's Edge"	4:43
10.	"Get Down"	13:41
11.	"Beers, Steers & Queers" (Drop Yer Britches Mix)	5:44
12.	"Beers, Steers & Queers" (Take 'Em Right Off Mix)	4:22
13.	"(Let's Talk) Physical"	6:54
Total length:		78:14

== Singles ==
Stainless Steel Providers (1989)

1. "Stainless Steel Providers"
2. "At the Top"
3. "T.V. Mind [Remix]" (CD only)

(Let's Get) Physical (1989)

1. "(Let's Get) Physical"
2. "(Let's Talk) Physical"

Beers, Steers & Queers (The Remixes) (1991)

1. "Beers, Steers & Queers [Drop Yer Britches Mix]" / "Beers, Steers & Queers [Take 'Em Right Off Mix]"
2. "Stainless Steel Providers [Live]"
3. "Public Image [Live]"

== Personnel ==
Credits adapted from liner notes

Revolting Cocks

- Alain Jourgensen – guitar, programming, production
- Luc van Acker – vocals, programming, production (vocals on track 8)
- Chris Connelly – vocals (tracks 2, 3, 5–7, 9), cover artwork
- William Rieflin – drums, programming
- Paul Barker – bass, programming, production

Additional personnel

- Phildo Owens – vocals (track 1)
- Nivek Ogre – vocals (track 4)
- Fluffy – engineer
- Brian Shanley – cover artwork
