= Cocked and Loaded =

Studio album by Revolting Cocks
- Released: February 14, 2006
- Recorded: 2004–2005
- Studios: Sonic Ranch and 13th Planet Studios, El Paso, Texas
- Genre: Industrial metal
- Length: 55:13
- Labels: 13 Planet, Megaforce
- Producer: Al Jourgensen

Revolting Cocks chronology
Linger Ficken' Good (1993)	Cocked and Loaded (2006)	Cocktail Mixxx (2007)

Professional ratings
Review scores
Source	Rating
AllMusic	3/5 stars
PopMatters	1/10 stars

Cocked and Loaded is an LP released February 14, 2006 by the Revolting Cocks on 13th Planet Records.

== Track listing ==
=== Promo and Europe ===
No.	Title	Writer(s)	Length
1.	"Fire Engine"	Al Jourgensen, Iggy Pop	4:59
2.	"Ten Million Ways to Die"	Gibby Haynes, Jourgensen, Mike Scaccia	4:45
3.	"Calienté" (Dark Entries)	Daniel Ash, Kevin Haskins, David J, Peter Murphy	4:27
4.	"Prune Tang"	Jourgensen, Phildo Owen	3:09
5.	"Dead End Streets"	Jourgensen, Owen	5:40
6.	"Pole Grinder"	Banch, Jourgensen	3:52
7.	"Jack in the Crack"	Banch, Jourgensen	3:28
8.	"Devil Cock"	Banch, Jourgensen	4:00
9.	"Viagra Culture"	Jello Biafra, Jourgensen	5:42
10.	"Revolting Cock au Lait"	Jourgensen, Lady Monster	3:42
Total length:			43:44

=== Retail ===
No.	Title	Length
1.	"RevColution Medley"	4:43
2.	"Ten Million Ways to Die"	4:45
3.	"Calienté" (Dark Entries)	4:27
4.	"Prune Tang"	3:09
5.	"Fire Engine"	4:59
6.	"Dead End Streets"	5:40
7.	"Pole Grinder"	3:53
8.	"Jack in the Crack"	3:28
9.	"Devil Cock"	4:01
10.	"Viagra Culture"	5:43
11.	"Revolting Cock au Lait"	10:25
Total length:		55:13

== Personnel ==
All track numbers refer to the retail version.

=== Revolting Cocks ===
- Alien Jourgensen - lead guitar (1, 5, 11), guitar (1, 4–11), bass (1, 3–7, 9–11), keyboards (1, 2, 5–7, 9–11), chorus guitar, chorus bass & percussion (2), background vocals (3–7, 9, 10), slide guitar (4, 6), vocals (4), drums (5, 6), drum programming (6, 7, 10), programming (8), fiddle (9), production, mixing
- Gibby Haynes - vocals (1–3, 11), background vocals (1, 11)
- Jello Biafra - vocals (6, 10)
- Rick Nielsen - surf guitar (5), second slide guitar lead (6), guitar & "Tarzan" vocals (11)
- Phildo Owen - scratching (2), vocals (4), background vocals (4, 6, 9, 10), cowbell (6), "rooster" & toy piano (9), "noises" (10)
- Stevie Banch - chorus vocals (2), vocals (5, 7–9), background vocals (5, 7, 9), lead & rhythm guitar (7, 8), bass & drum programming (8)
- Mark Baker - drums (1, 3, 4, 9, 11), background vocals (3, 4)

==== Additional Cocks ====
- Billy Gibbons - lead guitar (4), first slide guitar lead (6)
- Robin Zander - background vocals (7)
- David Garza - baritone guitar (4)
- Mike Scaccia - verse guitar & verse bass (2), guitar (3), wah guitar (4), "sample" guitar (10)
- Darrel James - programming, background vocals

=== Revolting Pussies ===
- Mackey Apple - background vocals (2, 11)
- Aretha Jay - gospel vocals (2), background vocals
- Lady Monster - background vocals, spoken word (11)
- Marla Manning - background vocals
- Vanessa Martinez - background vocals
- Nadja Plagens - background vocals
- Carolina Rhodes - background vocals
- Maureen Miller - background vocals

=== Strap-on Cox ===
- Marco A. Ramirez - background vocals, engineer
- Chuy Flores - background vocals
- Rene Garza - background vocals
- Robert Manning - background vocals
- Austin Rhodes - background vocals
- Hector Saenz - background vocals
- Bobby Torres - background vocals, assistant engineer
- Gil Elguezabal - background vocals, assistant engineer
- Ron Bissell - background vocals
- Jesus Reyes - background vocals

=== Additional personnel ===
- "Earth, Wind & Satan" - horns (2, 11)
- "The Hell Paso Texass Symphony Orchestra" - backing vocals (11)
- Justin Leeah - engineer
- Dave Donnelly - mastering
- Lawton Outlaw - artwork design & layout

== Additional information ==
This is the band's first full-length release in 13 years; the last LP, Linger Ficken' Good, was issued in 1993. The LP's original working title was "Purple Head" and was originally due in 2004. "Caliente (Dark Entries)," a cover of sorts of "Dark Entries" by Bauhaus, with vocalist Gibby Haynes, was featured on the soundtrack to Saw II in 2005. A new track, "RevColution Medley", has displaced "Fire Engine" as the first track from the promo on the album, moving it to track 5.

Oddly enough, the same two members of Cheap Trick also appear on Cocked & Loaded by L.A. Guns.

The song "Revolting Cock au Lait" (appeared in the Retail Version of the album) is a mishmash of many songs considered hard rock classics. The intro uses the sampled "stomp-clap" from Queen's "We Will Rock You" and in the middle there is a simultaneous mashup parodying both the chorus from Pink Floyd's "Another Brick in the Wall" and Led Zeppelin's "Immigrant Song", alluding topics like masturbation ("We don't need some masturbation... aaaaah... Go fuck yourself! We don't need no cock control... aaaah... You fuck yourself!") and child sexual abuse by priests ("Preachers... Leave those kids alone!"). At one point a transposed version of the guitar solo from Led Zeppelin's "Stairway To Heaven" can be heard. Also, the melody used for this song (chords and measures) are based on Jimi Hendrix's "Purple Haze". "RevColution Medley" is a shorter version of "Revolting Cock au Lait", before the parody of this Pink Floyd song.
