= Linger Ficken' Good =

Studio album by Revolting Cocks
- Released: September 28, 1993
- Recorded: 1990, 1993 in Chicago, Illinois
- Genre: Industrial rock
- Length: 64:34
- Labels: Sire/Reprise/Warner Bros. 45407
- Producer: Revolting Cocks

Revolting Cocks chronology
Beers, Steers, and Queers (1990)	Linger Ficken' Good (1993)	Cocked and Loaded (2006)

Professional ratings
Review scores
Source	Rating
Allmusic	3/5 stars
Entertainment Weekly	B
MusicHound Rock	3/5 stars

Linger Ficken' Good ... and Other Barnyard Oddities is the third studio album by American industrial rock band Revolting Cocks. The title is a satirical spoonerism of the advertising slogan employed by KFC in the 1970s—"Finger Lickin' Good."

Videos were made for two singles, the first of which was the cover of "Da Ya Think I'm Sexy?" which was directed by Thomas C. Rainone and featured Chris Connelly prominently, interacting with the patrons of a sleazy strip club, including David F. Friedman, Jewel Shepard and Linnea Quigley, and being horrified when the club switches into a nightmarish environment (exterior shots were filmed in front of the Ridglea Theater in Fort Worth, Texas). The second video was for "Crackin' Up", which was played on an episode of Beavis & Butthead.

== Track listing ==
All tracks by Revolting Cocks unless noted.

No.	Title	Length
1.	"Gila Copter"	5:58
2.	"Creep"	8:50
3.	"Mr. Lucky"	4:39
4.	"Crackin' Up"	6:26
5.	"Sergio"	6:32
6.	"Da Ya Think I'm Sexy?" (Rod Stewart, Carmine Appice, Duane Hitchings)	5:34
7.	"The Rockabye"	7:19
8.	"Butcher Flower's Woman"	4:57
9.	"Dirt"	5:07
10.	"Linger Ficken' Good"	9:12
Total length:		64:34

== Singles ==
Da Ya Think I'm Sexy? (1993)

1. "Da Ya Think I'm Sexy?"
2. "Sergio Guitar" (alternate version of "Sergio")
3. "Wrong Sexy Mix" (alternate version of "The Rockabye")

Crackin' Up (1994)

1. "Crackin' Up [Video Edit]"
2. "Crackin' Up [Amyl Nitrate Mix]"
3. "Gila Copter [Version 2]"

== Personnel ==
=== Revolting Cocks ===
- Al Jourgensen – programming, production, guitar, emceeing & backing vocals (4)
- Chris Connelly – vocals (2–9), programming, drum programming (7), production
- Luc van Acker – vocals
- William Rieflin – drums, organ (6), programming, production
- Paul Barker – bass, programming, production

=== Revolving Cocks ===
- Mike Scaccia – guitar
- Roland Barker – keyboards, saxophone (3, 5, 6), programming
- Louis Svitek – guitar
- Duane Buford – keyboards, spoken word (10)
- Duane Denison – guitar
- Timothy Leary – spoken word (1)

=== Revolting Pussies ===
- Patty Jourgensen – spoken word (10)
- Kim Assaley – spoken word (10)

=== Additional personnel ===
- Steve Spapperi – engineer
- Paul Manno – engineer
- Critter – engineer
- Tom Baker – mastering
- Rick Buscher – cover art
- Michael Balch – programming (4, uncredited)

=== Samples ===
- "Gila Copter" - "You have the power!"

Sampled from the scene in the 1991 film The Silence of the Lambs in which the mother of the kidnapped woman addresses the kidnapper on television, pleading with him to free her daughter.

- "Crackin' Up" - "What's in the bag, man...?"

Spoken by Christoper Pray in a scene in the 1971 film Dirty Harry in which Harry encounters a bunch of would-be muggers in a tunnel.

- "Crackin' Up" - "Crack rock 'n' shit!", "Got some blow?/Got some rock?", "Pushin' the rock", "Always trying to start some shit...!"

Sampled from the 1991 film Boyz n the Hood.
