= Big Sexy Land =

Studio album by Revolting Cocks
- Released: 1986
- Recorded: 1985, Chicago Recording Co.
- Genres: Industrial dance; new beat; EBM
- Length: 37:50
- Label: Wax Trax!
- Producer: Alain Jourgensen

Revolting Cocks chronology
Big Sexy Land (1986)	Live! You Goddamned Son of a Bitch (1989)

Big Sexy Land is the debut studio album by industrial rock band Revolting Cocks, released through Wax Trax! Records in 1986. This is the only album to feature the group's founding lineup of Luc van Acker, Richard 23 and Alain Jourgensen.

== Background ==
The album's title is a reference to a strip club in West Berlin. Jourgensen said that the club's large, neon sign was "the biggest capitalistic tease" for citizens in East Germany. The album was recorded in 1985 at ICP Studios in Brussels. Van Acker attributed the album's mixing to Jourgensen's sessions with Adrian Sherwood on Twitch. Van Acker said Jourgensen surreptitiously took notes on Sherwood's settings, but, without any context for the numbers, they had to later guess at what the settings were for, such as reverb and delay time. According to Van Acker, Jourgensen did not appear as a musician on the album because he was still under contract by Sire. After Jourgensen released a dub remix of "You Often Forget" without the band's input, Richard 23 quit.

== Additional information ==
The track "We Shall Cleanse the World" includes a sample of the title phrase taken from the film The Omega Man starring Charlton Heston.

The title of the track "Attack Ships on Fire" is taken from dialog in the film Blade Runner.

"38" is a reference to the victims of the Heysel Stadium disaster which occurred on May 29, 1985, although the final death toll in the disaster was actually 39.

== Reception ==
Professional ratings
Review scores
Source	Rating
AllMusic	3/5 stars
MusicHound Rock	2.5/5 stars

The Rough Guide to Rock described the album as a "more fluid Nitzer Ebb" evocative of current trends in electronic music. AllMusic wrote that it is "a distinguished debut from a 'side project' that occasionally surpasses the day-job work that its members became famous for".

== Track listing ==
No.	Title	Length
1.	"38"	4:07
2.	"We Shall Cleanse the World"	5:32
3.	"Attack Ships on Fire"	4:52
4.	"Big Sexy Land"	3:49
5.	"Union Carbide" (West Virginia Version)	3:24
6.	"T. V. Mind"	5:39
7.	"No Devotion"	6:48
8.	"Union Carbide" (Bhopal Version)	3:39
Total length:		37:50

CD bonus tracks
No.	Title	Length
9.	"You Often Forget" (Malignant)	8:34
10.	"Attack Ships…" (12" Version)	4:44
11.	"On Fire" (12" Version)	7:05
12.	"No Devotion" (12" version)	10:33
Total length:		68:47

2004 reissue
No.	Title	Length
1.	"38"	4:10
2.	"We Shall Cleanse the World"	5:35
3.	"Attack Ships on Fire"	4:55
4.	"Big Sexy Land"	3:58
5.	"Union Carbide" (West Virginia)	3:17
6.	"T.V. Mind"	5:42
7.	"You Often Forget" (Malignant)	8:30
8.	"No Devotion"	6:53
9.	"Union Carbide" (Bhopal)	3:37
10.	"Attack Ships on Fire" (12" Version)	6:51
11.	"No Devotion" (12" Version)	10:33
12.	"TV Mind Remix" (Alt. Mix)	4:26
13.	"On Fire"	4:46
Total length:		73:13

== Singles ==
No Devotion (1985)

1. "No Devotion"
2. "Attack Ships..."
3. "...On Fire"

== Personnel ==
=== Revolting Cocks ===
- Luc van Acker – vocals, guitars
- Richard 23 – vocals, programming
- Alain Jourgensen – production, engineering

=== Additional personnel ===
- Bill Rieflin – drums ("You Often Forget")
- John Mathias – additional engineering
- Patrick Codenys – additional keyboards (2, 4, 6)
- Jim Nash – cover
- Brian Shanley – cover
- Phil Austin – mastering
