= Special Affect =

American new wave band, 1978–1981

- Origin: Chicago, Illinois, U.S.
- Genres: New wave; post-punk
- Years active: 1978–1981
- Label: Special Affect Music
- Spinoffs: Ministry
- Past members: Frank Nardiello (vocals); Tom Hoffman (guitar 1978–1979); Al Jourgensen (guitar 1979–1980); Martin Sorenson (bass guitar); Harry Rushakoff (drums)

Special Affect (originally called Special Affects) was an American new wave band active from the late 1970s until 1981. They were notable for comprising the earliest-known recordings of future Ministry founder Al Jourgensen, future My Life with the Thrill Kill Kult vocalist Frank Nardiello, future Concrete Blonde drummer Harry Rushakoff, and bassist Martin Sorenson.

The band released a 7" EP called Mood Music in 1979. This release features original guitarist Tom Hoffman, who left the band in 1979 and was replaced by Jourgensen. "Vertigo Feeling", from this EP, would eventually be widely released on the Rykodisc CD Industrial Family Platter!, a compilation of songs by Ministry and My Life with the Thrill Kill Kult. Special Affect's only album, Too Much Soft Living, which was released in 1981, was advertised as the original soundtrack to a film of the same name; however, no such film exists.

Special Affect moved to San Francisco for a brief period with support from a financier, however during a gig Rushakoff and Jourgensen had an altercation on stage, which resulted in the group disbanding. Jourgensen misremembered this gig as taking place at the DNA Lounge, but the DNA Lounge did not open until 1985, years after Special Affect had ceased being a band.

Two songs on Ministry's Early Trax compilation, "I'm Falling" and "Overkill", date back to the time of Special Affect, and feature Special Affect's bassist Martin Sorenson. When Jourgensen started Ministry in 1981, Sorenson joined as the band's original bassist, although he had left the group within a year.
