= Buck Satan and the 666 Shooters =

American alternative country band

- Genres: Cowpunk; alternative country
- Years active: 2006–2012
- Members: Buck Satan; Rick Nielsen; Tony Campos
- Past members: Mike Scaccia

Buck Satan and the 666 Shooters is an American alternative country supergroup, formed by Ministry frontman Al Jourgensen, who uses the pseudonym Buck Satan. The initial lineup also featured Rick Nielsen of Cheap Trick and ex-Ministry members Tony Campos and Mike Scaccia. Campos is also known as a bassist for industrial rock band Static-X.

The band was formed in 2006 after the death of the country singer Buck Owens, who inspired Jourgensen to start the project. Jourgensen also referred to band's musical style as "heavy western" and "country-core".

The band's only studio album, Bikers Welcome Ladies Drink Free, was released on January 17, 2012, via 13th Planet. It received mixed reviews from critics.

The band's guitarist, Mike Scaccia, died on December 23, 2012, due to a heart attack while performing onstage with Rigor Mortis.

== Members ==
Current members

- Tony Campos – bass (2006–present)
- Rick Nielsen – guitar (2006–present)
- Buck Satan – vocals, banjo, guitar, pedal steel guitar, harmonica, keyboards, mandolin (2006–present)

Past members

- Mike Scaccia – guitar, banjo, dobro (2006–2012; his death)

== Discography ==
Studio album

- Bikers Welcome Ladies Drink Free (2011, 13th Planet)
