= Sex-O Olympic-O =

Studio album by Revolting Cocks
- Released: March 3, 2009
- Recorded: 2007–2008
- Studio: 13th Planet Studios, El Paso, Texas
- Genre: Industrial metal
- Length: 50:47
- Label: 13th Planet, Megaforce
- Producer: Al Jourgensen

Revolting Cocks chronology
Cocktail Mixxx (2007)	Sex-O Olympic-O (2009)	Sex-O MiXXX-O (2009)

Professional ratings
Review scores
Source	Rating
AllMusic	2/5 stars
Release Magazine	8/10 stars

Sex-O Olympic-O is the fifth album by the Revolting Cocks, released on March 3, 2009, through 13th Planet Records. The song "Wizard of Sextown" is featured in the 2008 horror film Saw V.

== Track listing ==
All lyrics written by Josh Bradford, all music written by Al Jourgensen, Sin Quirin and Clayton Worbeck, unless noted.

No.	Title	Writer(s)	Length
1.	"Hookerbot3000"		3:30
2.	"Keys to the City" (Vegas Mix)	Jourgensen; Paul Raven; Quirin; Worbeck	3:38
3.	"Red Parrot"	Jourgensen; Quirin	4:32
4.	"Robo Bandidos"	Jourgensen; Quirin	4:14
5.	"Cousins"		4:16
6.	"Touch Screen"		4:02
7.	"I'm Not Gay"	Jourgensen; Quirin	6:15
8.	"Abundant Redundancy"		4:28
9.	"Lewd Ferrigno"		4:05
10.	"Wizard of Sextown"	Jourgensen; Quirin; Raven	7:20
11.	"Hookerbot3000" (Disco-A-Go-Go Mix)		4:27
12.	"I'm Not Gay" (DJ Hardware Dirty Texan Remix)	Jourgensen; Quirin	10:52
Total length:			50:47

== Personnel ==
=== RevCo ===
- Josh Bradford - lead and background vocals
- Alien Jourgensen - production, drum programming, guitars (2), horn arrangements, keyboards (2), harmonica (3), programming, background vocals (1, 2, 7, 12)
- Sin Quirin - guitars (1, 3–12), bass (1, 3–8, 11, 12), keyboards
- Clayton Worbeck - keyboards, programming, mixing, bass (9)

=== Additional personnel ===
- Paul Raven - bass (2, 10)
- Isa Martinez - additional Spanish vocals (4)
- John Bilberry - engineer, drum programming
- Dave Donnelly - mastering
- Lawton Outlaw - art director, design & layout
- Allan Amato - model photography
- Bridget Blonde - cover model
