= Relapse (Ministry album) =

Studio album by Ministry
- Released: March 23, 2012
- Recorded: September–December 2011
- Genre: Industrial metal; thrash metal
- Length: 50:07
- Label: 13th Planet
- Producer: Al Jourgensen, Samuel D'Ambruoso

Ministry chronology
The Last Sucker (2007)	Relapse (2012)	From Beer to Eternity (2013)

Singles from Relapse
- 1. "99 Percenters" Released: December 23, 2011; 2. "Double Tap" Released: February 24, 2012

Relapse is the twelfth studio album by industrial metal band Ministry, which was released on March 23, 2012, through 13th Planet Records. It was recorded in the wake of their three-year hiatus from November 2008 to August 2011 and Al Jourgensen's near-death experience in 2010. Relapse is also the last Ministry album released during guitarist Mike Scaccia's lifetime, although he appeared posthumously on the band's next album, From Beer to Eternity.

== Background ==
Relapse is Ministry's first studio album featuring original material since 2007's The Last Sucker, marking the longest gap, to date, between their studio albums. The band previously broke up in 2008 and Jourgensen had since stated that a reunion would never happen. In the November 2008 issue of Hustler Magazine, Jourgensen said that the reason they were breaking up was that they "take up so much time" as well as the hassle of getting out new albums. He also said he was responsible for six other bands and can get seven albums done a year while not working on new Ministry material.

Ministry ended their hiatus on August 7, 2011, when it was announced that they were going to play at Germany's Wacken Open Air festival, set to take place August 2–4, 2012. Later that month, Jourgensen told Metal Hammer that Ministry had begun work on Relapse, which they hope to release by Christmas. Regarding the sound of the new material, he explained, "We've only got five songs to go. I've been listening to it the last couple of weeks and I wasn't really in the mood, I was just taking it as a joke. Just to pass the time at first but [Mikey's] raving about it. It's like, dude c'mon, this is not about Bush, so… that parts over. The ulcers are gone and Bush is gone so it's time for something new. I think this is actually gonna wind up being the fastest and heaviest record I've ever done. Just because we did it as anti-therapy therapy against the country music we would just take days off and thrash faster than I've done in a long time, faster than Mikey's done in a long time. He just did a Rigor Mortis tour and said it was easy compared to this Ministry stuff so it's gonna be brutal and it's gonna freak a lot of people out."

Ministry announced on their website that they entered the studio on September 1, 2011, with engineer Sammy D'Ambruoso to begin recording Relapse. The song "Ghouldiggers" explains Al Jourgensen's belief on the way the music industry capitalizes on a musician's death.

The cover art was revealed on December 19, 2011. "99 Percenters" was released a single to promote Relapse. The band released it on iTunes on December 23, 2011, and two days later, began streaming it on their Facebook page. On January 20, 2012, it was announced that "Double Tap" would be released as a maxi-single on February 24.

== Reception ==
Professional ratings
Aggregate scores
Source	Rating
Metacritic	68/100
Review scores
Source	Rating
AllMusic	3.5/5 stars
Billboard	favorable
COMA Music Magazine	favorable
Consequence of Sound	2/5 stars
Now	3/5 stars
ReGen Magazine	4/5 stars

Critical reception to Relapse has been mostly positive. At Metacritic, the album was given a score of 68 out of 100 based on "generally favorable reviews". AllMusic reviewer David Jeffries called it "a harder and faster-than-usual album from the group, and yet there's also a heavier element of control throughout, as Jourgensen holds the reins tighter, guiding this industrial-thrash monster down a speedy track without going over the edge".

== Track listing ==
No.	Title	Writer(s)	Length
1.	"Ghouldiggers"	Jourgensen, Scaccia, Orr	7:41
2.	"Double Tap"	Jourgensen, Quirin	4:06
3.	"FreeFall"	Jourgensen	4:36
4.	"Kleptocracy"	Jourgensen, Victor	3:54
5.	"United Forces" (Stormtroopers of Death cover)	Milano, Benante, Lilker, Ian	4:53
6.	"99 Percenters"	Jourgensen, Victor, D'Ambruoso	3:53
7.	"Relapse"	Jourgensen	5:49
8.	"Weekend Warrior"	Jourgensen, Scaccia, D'Ambruoso	5:43
9.	"Git Up Get Out 'n Vote"	Jourgensen, Victor	3:59
10.	"Bloodlust"	Jourgensen, Victor	5:37

Relapse – Reissue bonus tracks
No.	Title	Length
11.	"Relapse (Defibrillator Mix)"	7:06
12.	"Double Tap (Dottkom & Sy4e Trash Electro Remix)"	5:51
13.	"Double Tap (Dottkom & Sy4e Industrial Filth Remix)"	4:51

== Personnel ==
- Al Jourgensen – vocals, keyboards, guitars, backing vocals
- Mike Scaccia – guitars (1, 5, 8)
- Sin Quirin – guitar (2)
- Tommy Victor – guitars (4, 6, 9, 10)
- Casey Orr – bass (1), keyboards (1)
- Tony Campos – bass
- Samuel D'Ambruoso – drum programming, vocals (8)
- Angelina Jourgensen – additional vocals
- Hector Munoz – additional vocals
- Marty Lopez – additional vocals

== Chart positions ==
Chart (2012)	Peak position
Finnish Albums (Suomen virallinen lista)	45
German Albums (Offizielle Top 100)	72
Swedish Albums (Sverigetopplistan)	56
Swiss Albums (Schweizer Hitparade)	99
US Billboard 200	193
US Hard Rock Albums (Billboard)	16
US Independent Albums (Billboard)	32
US Rock Albums (Billboard)	46
US Tastemakers Albums (Billboard)	20
