= From Beer to Eternity =

Studio album by Ministry
- Released: September 6, 2013
- Recorded: December 2012 – March 2013
- Studio: 13th Planet compound, El Paso, Texas
- Genre: Industrial metal; thrash metal
- Length: 54:43
- Label: 13th Planet
- Producer: Al Jourgensen, Sammy D'Ambruoso

Ministry chronology
Relapse (2012)	From Beer to Eternity (2013)	AmeriKKKant (2018)

Singles from From Beer to Eternity
- 1. "PermaWar" Released: August 9, 2013

Professional ratings
Review scores
Source	Rating
AllMusic	3.5/5 stars
The Hippo	A
Loudwire	4/5 stars
Metal Hammer	4/5 stars
Sputnikmusic	3.0/5

From Beer to Eternity is the thirteenth studio album by American industrial metal band Ministry, released on September 6, 2013, by 13th Planet Records. Although frontman Al Jourgensen had previously stated that this was going to be Ministry's final album (following the death of guitarist Mike Scaccia, who appears posthumously), a follow-up album, AmeriKKKant, was released in 2018. From Beer to Eternity was also the first Ministry album since Houses of the Molé (2004) not to feature Tommy Victor on guitars or bass.

The sole single from the album, "PermaWar", was released by the iTunes Store on August 9, 2013.

== Background and recording ==
In December 2012, Ministry frontman Al Jourgensen, guitarists Mike Scaccia and Sin Quirin, bassist Tony Campos, and drummer Aaron Rossi entered studio sessions and worked on the rough tracks for 18 songs at Jourgensen's 13th Planet Records compound in El Paso, Texas. The sessions turned out to be fruitful, with Jourgensen noting, "We have never, in the history of Ministry, ever had a tracking session like that before. Everything went so smoothly, it was surreal."

Three days after the band had completed the sessions, Scaccia, whom Jourgensen described as the driving force behind the record, died onstage playing with his band Rigor Mortis, due to a sudden heart attack brought on by previously undiagnosed heart disease. Following a funeral in Dallas, Jourgensen and co-producer Sammy D'Ambruoso spent three months in studio to put the final touches on the album.

== Artwork ==
The cover art and accompanying artwork was created by photographer Allan Amato. The artwork features seven female models, who act as sexualized and "monster-ified" personifications of seven deadly sins. On the artwork, Al Jourgensen stated:

The Seven Deadly Sins is the intention and the women are not really women. If you look at them, they're not some hot models—I mean, they started out that way, but we completely mutated them just to parody the entire sexuality thing...I guess I'll be taking some heat for being a misogynist by carrying seven women in a bag like they're groupies or something. If I ever saw a groupie look like that on my bus, I guarantee my road manager would have them off the bus within a minute, so it's not a sexual thing. And it's certainly not misogynistic.

The album artwork and the title were mocked by Josh Modell of the A.V. Club, comparing it conceptually to the fictional album Smell the Glove by Spinal Tap. In response and as a joke, Ministry posted new cover artwork, titled Whole Lotta Glove.

A behind-the-scenes video, depicting the creation of the artwork, was released on June 28, 2013.

== Track listing ==
All lyrics are written by Al Jourgensen

From Beer to Eternity standard edition track listing
No.	Title	Music	Length
1.	"Hail to His Majesty (Peasants)"	Al Jourgensen, Sin Quirin	5:17
2.	"Punch in the Face"	Jourgensen, Quirin	5:00
3.	"PermaWar"	Jourgensen, Quirin, Mike Scaccia	4:56
4.	"Perfect Storm"	Jourgensen, Quirin	4:56
5.	"Fairly Unbalanced"	Jourgensen, Quirin	4:15
6.	"The Horror"	Jourgensen, Sammy D'Ambruoso	3:33
7.	"Side F/X Include Mikey's Middle Finger (TV4)"	Jourgensen, Scaccia	5:14
8.	"Lesson Unlearned"	Jourgensen, Quirin, Scaccia	3:16
9.	"Thanx but No Thanx"	Jourgensen	8:21
10.	"Change of Luck"	Jourgensen, Quirin, Scaccia	7:16
11.	"Enjoy the Quiet"	Jourgensen, Quirin	2:39
Total length:			54:43

From Beer to Eternity Best Buy Deluxe edition additional tracks
No.	Title	Music	Length
12.	"PermaWar Remix"	Jourgensen, Quirin, Scaccia	7:23
13.	"Thanks for the Dub Remix"	Jourgensen	4:53
Total length:			66:19

From Beer to Eternity LP edition additional track
No.	Title	Music	Length
12.	"Punch in the Face Remix"	Jourgensen, Quirin	7:58
Total length:			62:01

=== Samples ===
- "Thanx but No Thanx" makes use of William S. Burroughs's poem "A Thanksgiving Prayer", as read by Sgt. Major, who also appeared on Ministry's tenth studio album Rio Grande Blood (2006).

== Personnel ==
=== Ministry ===
- Al Jourgensen – vocals (1–5, 7–10, 12–14), guitars (1, 3, 8–10, 12, 13), keyboards (1, 3, 10, 12), harmonica (3, 12), programming (6), bass (9, 13), production, mixing
- Mike Scaccia – guitars (3, 7–10, 12), bass (3, 12, 13)
- Sin Quirin – guitars (1–5, 8, 10, 12, 14), keyboards (1, 2, 14), synthesizer programming (2, 10, 14), bass (2, 14), drum programming (10)
- Tony Campos – bass (1, 4, 5, 7, 8, 10)
- Aaron Rossi – drums (2, 8, 14), drum programming (8)

=== Additional personnel ===
- Sammy D'Ambruoso – keyboards (1), drum programming (1–5, 7, 8, 10, 12–14), synthesizer programming (2, 3, 12, 14), programming (6), backing vocals (10), noises (11), remix (12–14), engineering, production
- Aaron Havill – theremin (4), synthesizer programming (4, 8, 10), programming (6), sampling, synthesizer, backing vocals, engineering, second engineering
- Patty Fox – backing vocals (8, 10)
- Sgt. Major – spoken word (9, 11, 13)
- Hector Muñoz – backing vocals
- Matt Bridges – backing vocals
- Allan Amato – artwork
- Angelina Jourgensen – executive production
- Dave Donnelly – mastering

== Chart positions ==
Chart (2013)	Peak position
German Albums (Offizielle Top 100)	79
US Billboard 200	140
US Hard Rock Albums (Billboard)	7
US Independent Albums (Billboard)	27
US Top Rock Albums (Billboard)	42

== Remix album ==
A remix album titled From Beer to Eternamix was released on November 22, 2015.
