= Dead Within =

- Film poster
- Directed by: Ben Wagner
- Written by: Matthew Bradford; Dean Chekvala; Amy Cale Peterson; Ben Wagner
- Produced by: Matthew Bradford; Peter James Cooper; George Folsey Jr.; Ben Wagner; Jennifer Westin
- Starring: Dean Chekvala; Amy Kale Peterson
- Cinematography: Tim Gillis
- Edited by: George Folsey Jr.
- Music by: Joshua Bradford; Clayton Worbeck
- Production companies: 3:41am; This Is Just a Test
- Distributed by: Millennium Entertainment
- Release date: August 23, 2014 (Frightfest)
- Running time: 82 minutes
- Country: United States
- Language: English

Dead Within is a 2014 American thriller film directed by Ben Wagner and written by Matthew Bradford, Dean Chekvala, Amy Kale Peterson, and Wagner. It stars Dean Chekvala and Amy Kale Peterson as a couple that survives a zombie apocalypse by hiding out in a cabin in the woods. Mike (Chekvala) periodically leaves the cabin to search for food and supplies, leaving Kim (Peterson) alone with her thoughts and paranoia.

== Plot ==
After a zombie apocalypse, Mike and Kim reinforce their cabin in the woods. Whenever their supplies run out, Mike leaves to scavenge. Though Kim wishes to come with him, he insists that she stay behind in the cabin, where she is safe. Mike, who keeps a running tally of the zombies that he destroys, uses a rhythmic series of knocks based on classic rock songs in order to identify himself and prove that he has not become infected. Symptoms of infection include black irises, black blood, and violent paranoia. As the supplies in the area become exhausted, Mike suggests that they return to hunting for their food. Kim refuses, and flashbacks reveal that a second couple, Todd and Erika, lived with them until Todd and Erika ate tainted meat. Mike and Kim are forced to kill both the couple and their own baby, who also ate the tainted food.

While Mike is out on a scavenging trip, Kim receives a call on her walkie-talkie from a man identifying himself as Ranger Mark. Mark is at first helpful and promises to aid her, but his calls become more abusive and misogynistic over time. Kim does not tell Mike about the calls. After an unproductive outing, Mike says that the area has become too dangerous for the meager supplies that he is able to find, and he proposes that they move to the coast, where they can live in a mansion and safely run a generator. Kim agrees and asks to accompany Mike, but he again refuses. Kim is left alone for a longer period this time, as Mike must locate enough resources to last them the entire trip. While he is gone, she experiences a series of nightmares and hallucinations, including hauntings by Erika and her baby, Ranger Mark's taunting her over their deaths, and paintings that seemingly come to life.

When Mike finally returns, he gets the coded knock incorrect. After Kim sees blood and cuts on him, she becomes suspicious and does not allow him entry. Mike insists that he is not infected and demands to be let inside, but Kim only becomes more distrustful and resentful of his past behavior. Desperate for shelter, Mike attempts to break into the cabin, and Kim cuts off several of his fingers. When Mike recovers, he finds that she has tied him to a chair and is debating what to do with him. Kim becomes convinced that Mike is infected despite his protestations, and she kills him. Excited that she may now leave the cabin, she dances in the yard. Mike's reanimated corpse attacks her, and she kills him once again. In the last shot, her irises and blood are revealed to have turned pitch black.

== Cast ==
- Dean Chekvala as Mike
- Amy Kale Peterson as Kim
- Rick Federman as Todd
- Sarah McMaster as Erika
- J. Claude Deering as Ranger Mike

== Release ==
After its world premiere at London FrightFest Film Festival, the film was acquired by Millennium Entertainment in June 2014. Dead Within made its US premiere in Austin, TX, at an event sponsored by Other Worlds Austin, a science fiction film festival. It was released on DVD on September 9, 2014.

== Reception ==
Anton Bitel of Grolsh Film Works described Dead Within as "a sharply nuanced survivor's tale that leaves the viewer to disentangle the genre tropes from their underlying triggers, and the reality from its delirious breakdown." Jeremy Blitz of DVD Talk wrote, "It's not totally successful, but definitely worth a watch."
