= Sin Quirin =

American guitarist

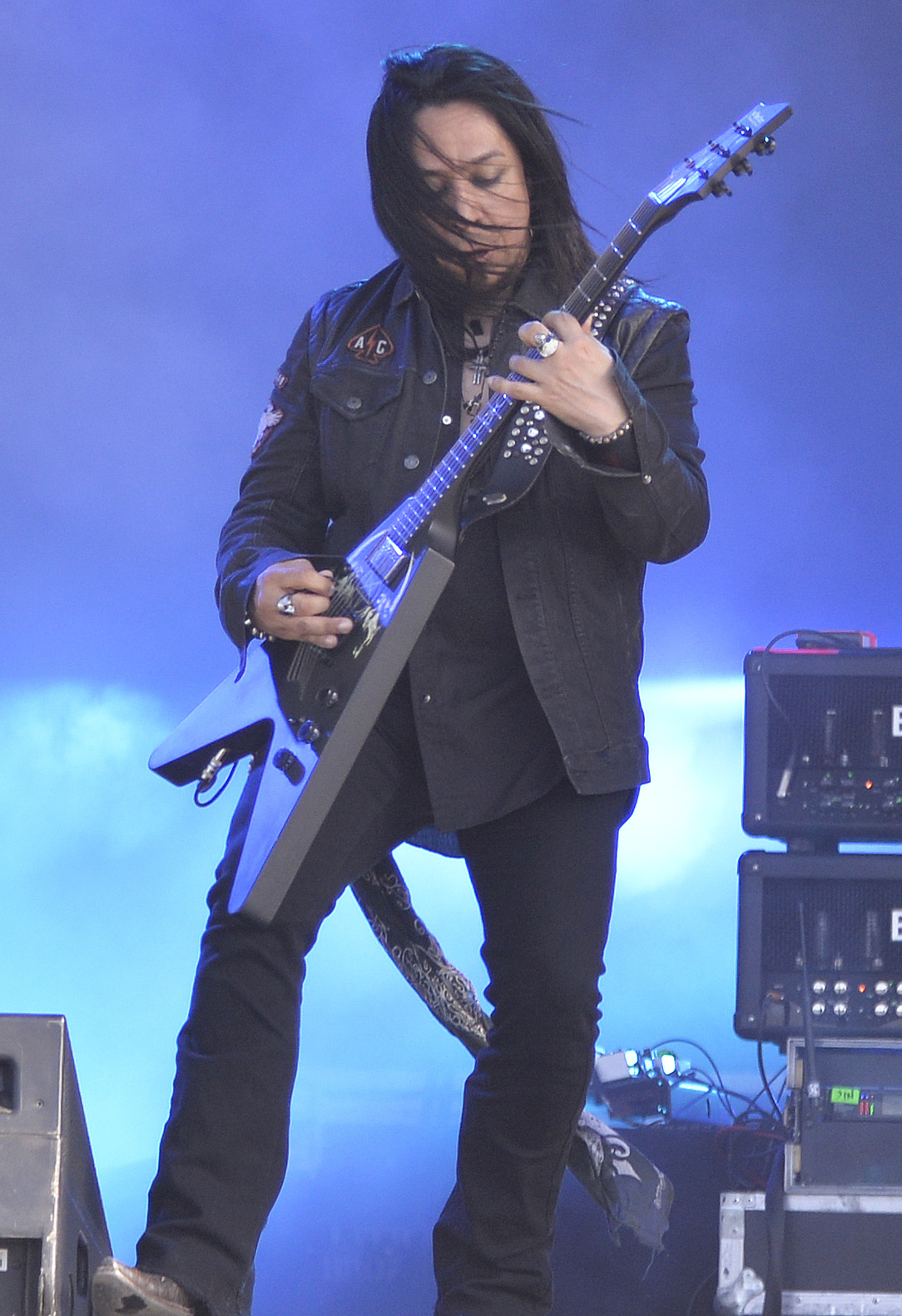
- Quirin performing with Ministry live at Hellfest 2017

Background information
- Born: Sinhue Quirin; February 11, 1969 (age 57); Burbank, California, United States
- Instruments: Guitar, keyboards
- Years active: 2000–present
- Labels: Megaforce; 13th Planet; Nuclear Blast
- Member of: Ministry, The Rust Punk Tribe, Supermanic

Sinhue "Sin" Quirin is an American guitarist based in Burbank, California. He came to prominence as a member of industrial metal band Ministry and its side projects, and as a primary songwriter on their albums The Last Sucker and From Beer to Eternity.

In addition to his role in Ministry (co-writing credits on the abovementioned releases and guitar on 2008's Cover Up album) and primary writing credits for Revolting Cocks albums Sex-O Olympic-O and ¿Got Cock?, Quirin toured the U.S. and worked with DJ Hardware on the 2009 ReVamp tour. He has been Grammy nominated twice, both times with Ministry: the first for "Under My Thumb" from the 2008 cover song album Cover Up (2008), and the second for "Señor Peligro" from the live 2009 album Adios... Puta Madres.

In 2010, Quirin joined Lords of Acid for Sextreme Ball 2010.

In 2011, it was announced that he would be joining American Head Charge.

He also worked on the project Supermanic – a Los Angeles-based rock band co-founded by Quirin and vocalist & music producer Kallaghan (Charles Massabo).

In addition to his work with Supermanic, in January 2014, Quirin announced his foray into the EDM world by releasing new industrial/aggrotech/electro dance tracks to fans.

Quirin rejoined Lords of Acid for their 2019 Pretty in Kink tour.

On January 17, 2020, Billboard released an exposé on Quirin detailing accounts of Quirin's alleged behavior including sexual relationships with underage girls while touring in San Antonio, TX; Portland, OR; and Tacoma, WA in the early 2000s.

On May 15, 2021, Quirin announced his departure from Ministry, to work on other projects and look after his health, following years of accusations of underage sexual abuse.

== Discography and collaborations ==
- Tactics – The Master Plan (1991)
- Society 1 – Exit Through Fear (2003)
- Society 1 – The Sound that Ends Creation (2005)
- Society 1 – The Years of Spiritual Dissent (2006)
- Ministry – The Last Sucker (2007)
- Ministry and Co-Conspirators – Cover Up (2008)
- Saw IV soundtrack (2007)
- Saw V soundtrack (2008)
- Wicked Lake soundtrack
- NCIS soundtrack
- Revolting Cocks – Sex-O Olympic-O (2009)
- Revolting Cocks – ¿Got Cock? (2010)
- Ministry – Relapse (2012)
- Ministry – From Beer to Eternity (2013)
- KMFDM – Hell Yeah (2017)
- Ministry – AmeriKKKant (2018)
