= Luc van Acker =

Musical artist (born 1961)

Luc Van Acker
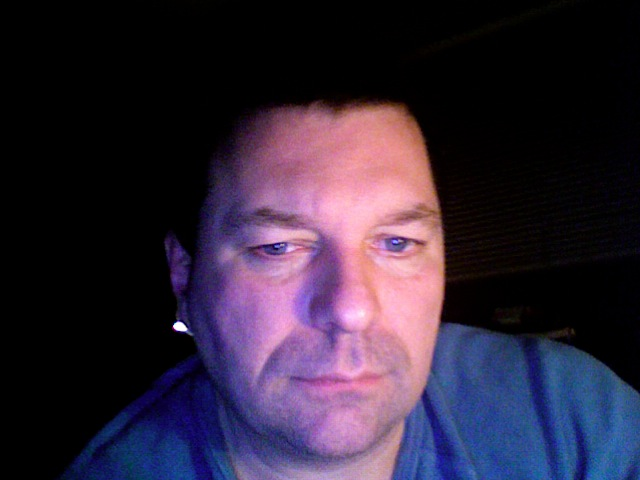
- Luc Van Acker in 2004
- Born: October 6, 1961 (age 64); Tienen, Belgium
- Musical career
- Genres: Industrial
- Member of: Revolting Cocks

Luc Van Acker is a Belgian pop singer, songwriter, and music producer. He began writing and releasing solo material in 1982, contributed guitar on Shriekback's 1984 album Jam Science, and collaborated with Anna Domino on the track "Zanna" for his 1984 solo album The Ship (released in the United States as Luc Van Acker).

== Career ==
In 1985, he met Richard 23 of Front 242 at the DNA Club in Brussels, Belgium, and thereby became a founding member of Revolting Cocks along with Ministry's Al Jourgensen. He appears on their first three studio albums (Big Sexy Land, Beers, Steers, and Queers, and Linger Ficken Good), and the live album Live! You Goddamned Son of a Bitch.

In 1986, he produced a mini-LP for Anna Domino titled East/West.

In 1989–1990, he was the producer of Mussolini Headkick, who released two records including one on the WaxTrax! Records label.
