= Revolting Cocks =

American-Belgian industrial rock band

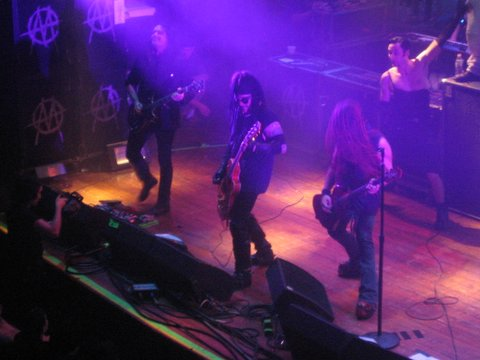
- Live on stage, 2006

Background information
- Also known as: RevCo; The Cocks
- Origin: Belgium; United States
- Genres: Industrial rock; post-industrial; industrial metal
- Years active: 1985–1993; 2004–2010; 2011; 2013; 2016–present
- Labels: Wax Trax; Sire; 13th Planet; Cleopatra
- Spinoff of: Ministry; Front 242
- Members: Luc van Acker; Richard 23; Paul Barker; Chris Connelly; Jason Novak; Dan Brill
- Past members: Al Jourgensen; Bill Rieflin; Phildo Owen; Duane Buford; Mike Scaccia; Josh Bradford; Sin Quirin; Clayton Worbeck

Revolting Cocks, also known as RevCo, are an American-Belgian industrial rock band, and sometimes supergroup, that began as a musical side project for Al Jourgensen of Ministry, Richard 23 of Front 242, and Belgian musician Luc van Acker. Unlike the more serious industrial metal of Ministry, the band frequently incorporates parody and humorous or absurd sexual themes into its music, combining aggressive industrial sounds with danceable rhythms and samples.

The band released three studio albums between 1986 and 1993 and then went on hiatus before being revived by Jourgensen in 2004. The revived band released three more studio albums, with the latter two featuring vocalist Josh Bradford, keyboardist Clayton Worbeck, and guitarist Sin Quirin. Former members Richard 23, Luc van Acker, Paul Barker, and Chris Connelly reunited for performances in 2016 and 2017, using the name The Cocks before returning to the original band name.

== History ==
=== 1984: Origins ===
Revolting Cocks' origins date to late 1984, when Belgian industrial dance group Front 242, after being invited by Chicago-based indie record label Wax Trax! Records, commenced their first American tour as an opening act for their then-labelmates, American band Ministry. Afterwards, Ministry lead singer Al Jourgensen asked Front 242 member Richard 23 to produce a dub remix project. After returning to Brussels, Richard 23 discussed collaboration with Luc van Acker; Van Acker, previously session guitarist for Shriekback, joined the newly formed project after talking with Jourgensen over the phone. (Note: "[Jon Wiederhorn]: You were one of the original Revolting Cocks. How did the band come together? / [Luc van Acker]: Al was a DJ, and he was working at Wax Trax! with Jim [Nash] and Danny [Flesher]. Because he was a DJ, Al discovered Front 242 and invited them to be Ministry's support act in America. They got along very well on tour, so afterwards Al invited Richard 23 of Front 242 to do a dub-remix project with him. When Richard came back to Brussels I met him at a bar called the DNA, and he said, 'I'm going back to Chicago to do this studio project with Al Jourgensen, and I'm going to phone him tonight.' I went with him to his apartment and he put me on the phone with Al, and Al said, 'Who the fuck are you?' I said, 'Well, I played some guitar with Shriekback.' Al knew Shriekback very well; he used to play their songs when he was a DJ in England. He said, "You have to come over with Richard." When Richard and I arrived in Chicago, Richard didn't speak much English. He could only say two words: 'great' and 'fuck.' So I had to help him out at immigration. Before we went to Chicago we wanted to dress up real tough, so we went to an Army store and bought old military clothes, including these hats. We didn't know that in America they looked like duck hunter hats. When we walked through immigration Al was screaming at us, 'The Belgian duck hunters have arrived!' We looked over, and he had turned around and pulled down his pants, so the first thing I got to see from Al was his ass from the balcony at the airport.") The band's name came from an incident that took place in a Chicago bar; according to van Acker and Jourgensen, the band was trying out "insulting French expressions" on a waiter, ordering something they said meant "revolting cock" which led the waiter to say, "You are revolting cocks!"

Their first release was "No Devotion" on Wax Trax! Records in 1985. The single was quickly followed by an album, Big Sexy Land (1986), featuring a mix of industrial, hard rock, and EBM with dominating sampling and strong synthesized beats.

=== 1985–1994: Initial run ===
Richard 23 quit in 1986, after falling out with Jourgensen over his and Adrian Sherwood's remix of the song "You Often Forget". The group's remaining two members were augmented by Chris Connelly (formerly of Finitribe, later of Ministry), Paul Barker and Bill Rieflin (both formerly of The Blackouts and at the time in Ministry), with various others appearing as contributors or guests.

The following live album, Live! You Goddamned Son of a Bitch (1988), recorded at a single September 1987 show in Chicago, featured more aggressive versions of the Big Sexy Land tracks along with some new material. This trend continued on Beers, Steers, and Queers (1990), layering sample over sample and pushing ever further into distortion. The budget for Beers, Steers, and Queers and its accompanying single "(Let's Get) Physical" ballooned to $30,000 in early 1990 primarily due to copyright troubles surrounding the cover of Olivia Newton-John's hit song, and led to a strained relationship between Jourgensen and Wax Trax. As it happened, these would be the last Revolting Cocks releases on Wax Trax as Sire Records bought out the rights to all of Jourgensen's side projects.

Linger Ficken' Good (1993) was released by Sire Records, with most tracks returning to the less layered material. Included was a cover of Rod Stewart's "Da Ya Think I'm Sexy?", also released as a single. A tour was planned but cancelled, and the band went on hiatus.

=== 2004–2010: First revival ===
In 2004, Jourgensen and former RevCo player Phildo Owens (Skatenigs, Snow Black) revived the group and previewed a new song, "Prune Tang". An album titled Purple Head was due in 2004, but was delayed until 2006 with a change in title to Cocked and Loaded. "Caliente (Dark Entries)", a cover of "Dark Entries" by Bauhaus, with vocalist Gibby Haynes (Butthole Surfers), was featured on the soundtrack to Saw II in 2005.

After assembling a touring line up to open for Ministry on the MasterBaTour of 2006, Jourgensen chose vocalist Josh Bradford (Stayte, Simple Shelter, V.H.S.), keyboardist Clayton Worbeck (Stayte, Simple Shelter), and guitarist Sin Quirin (Society 1, later Ministry and ReVamp) as the new full-time members for the Revolting Cocks, now simply being called "RevCo". The group recorded Sex-O Olympic-O, which was originally set to be released in October 2008, but was delayed multiple times until it saw release on March 3, 2009. Following a tour, a second album with this lineup, ¿Got Cock?, was released on April 13, 2010. The project fell apart once again with Bradford and Worbeck parting ways. Quirin continued to work with Jourgensen following Ministry's revival in 2011.

=== 2010s: Second revival ===
In celebration of the record label, a "Wax Trax! Records Retrospectacle: 33 1/3 Year Anniversary" concert series was held from April 15 to 17, 2011 at Metro Chicago in Chicago, Illinois. As a part of the lineup, Chris Connelly, Paul Barker, and Luc van Acker performed Revolting Cocks songs with Duane Buford, Dan Brill, Jamie Duffy and others. For their performance on the 17th, Richard 23 joined them on stage to sing "No Devotion".

In 2016, Richard 23, van Acker, Barker, and Connelly performed under the shorter name The Cocks for a six-date tour to mark the 30th anniversary of Big Sexy Land, accompanied by Dan Brill and Jason Novak. A larger tour followed in 2017, with the band using the original Revolting Cocks name. The band played a series of gigs in Europe, including the WGT and Infest festivals, before returning to the US for a tour with Front Line Assembly.

On April 8, 2018, Jourgensen announced that another album was in the process of being recorded.

== Members ==
Current members

- Richard 23 – vocals (1985–1986, 2011 [guest appearance], 2016–present), percussion (1985–1986)
- Luc van Acker – vocals (1985–1991, 2006, 2011, 2013, 2016–present), guitars (1985–1988)
- Paul Barker – bass (1987–1993, 2011, 2013, 2016–present), production (1987–1993)
- Chris Connelly – vocals (1987–1993, 2011, 2013, 2016–present)

Former members

- Al Jourgensen – production, guitar (1985–1993, 2004–2010)
- Bill Rieflin – drums (1986–1993; died 2020)
- Phildo Owen – vocals (1989–1991, 2004–2006)
- Duane Buford – keyboards (1993, 2011, 2013)
- Mike Scaccia – guitar (1993, 2004–2006; died 2012)
- Josh Bradford – vocals (2006–2010)
- Sin Quirin – guitars, bass, keyboards (2006–2010)
- Clayton Worbeck – keyboards, bass (2006–2010)

Touring members

- Nivek Ogre – vocals (1988)
- Michael Balch – keyboards (1990–1991)
- Mark Durante – guitar, backing vocals (1990–1991)
- Trent Reznor – vocals (1990)
- Jeff Ward – drums (1990; died 1993)
- Anna K – bass (2006)
- Seven Antonopoulos – drums (2006)
- Murv Douglas – bass (2009)
- Aaron Rossi – drums (2009; died 2025)
- Jamie Duffy – guitar (2011; died 2012)
- Dan Brill – drums (2011, 2013, 2016–present)
- Jason Novak – samples, percussion, guitar (2016–present)

Timeline

== Discography ==
=== Studio albums ===
- Big Sexy Land (1986)
- Beers, Steers, and Queers (1990)
- Linger Ficken' Good (1993)
- Cocked and Loaded (2006)
- Sex-O Olympic-O (2009)
- ¿Got Cock? (2010)

=== Live albums ===
- Live! You Goddamned Son of a Bitch (1988)

=== Remix albums ===
- Cocktail Mixxx (2007)
- Sex-O MiXXX-O (2009)
- ¿Got Mixxx? (2011)

=== Singles ===
- "No Devotion" (1985)
- "You Often Forget" (1986) (UK Indie No. 13)
- "Stainless Steel Providers" (1989)
- "(Let's Get) Physical" (1989)
- "Beers, Steers, and Queers" (The Remixes) (1991)
- "Da Ya Think I'm Sexy?" (1993)
- "Crackin' Up" (1994)
