= The Last Sucker =

Studio album by Ministry
- Released: September 18, 2007
- Recorded: May 2007
- Studios: 13th Planet Studios, El Paso, Texas
- Genres: Industrial metal; thrash metal
- Length: 55:58
- Label: 13th Planet
- Producers: Al Jourgensen, Dave Donnelly

Ministry chronology
Rio Grande Dub (2007)	The Last Sucker (2007)	Relapse (2012)

Professional ratings
Aggregate scores
Source	Rating
Metacritic	73/100
Review scores
Source	Rating
About.com	3/5 stars
AbsolutePunk.net	87%
AllMusic	4/5 stars
Blabbermouth.net	8/10
Los Angeles Times	favorable
Miami New Times	favorable
Pitchfork	6.9/10
PopMatters	8/10 stars
The Skinny	4/5 stars
Spin	6/10
Stylus	B+

The Last Sucker is the eleventh studio album by industrial metal band Ministry, released in 2007 through 13th Planet Records. For three years until their reformation in 2011, it was the band's last studio album featuring new material. The album is the third and final part of the band's anti-George W. Bush trilogy, preceded by 2004's Houses of the Molé and 2006's Rio Grande Blood.

The Last Sucker featured the lineup of frontman Al Jourgensen, bassist Paul Raven, guitarist Tommy Victor, keyboardist John Bechdel, and guitarist Sin Quirin. Raven, Victor, and Bechdel had previously collaborated together in Victor's band Prong in the mid-1990s (primarily for Prong's breakthrough album Cleansing). The Last Sucker ultimately ended up being one of Raven's final performances on a studio album due to his death shortly after the album's release.

== Overview ==
Jourgensen told Billboard that he had "...other things to do. I just started a label (13th Planet Records), and I want to sign some bands and really build it up like I did with WaxTrax in the '80s, not just a vanity label. I think it's time, and I'll be leaving on the top of my game instead of hanging on too long and doing crappy Aerosmith and Rolling Stones albums thirty years later."

"That seems to be my muse; everyone seems to think I write real shitty music when a Democrat's in office. So we'll do that one, and then me and George (W.) Bush go riding off hand-in-hand, into the sunset."

Fear Factory frontman Burton C. Bell recorded some guest vocals for the album.

On July 17, 2007, a promotional copy of the album was leaked on the internet. A week earlier lyrics and full credits for the album were released by SureShotWorx on their official website.

A Best Buy-exclusive version of the CD contains remixes of "Watch Yourself" and "The Last Sucker."

The final track, "End of Days Part Two", contains a lengthy sample from 34th President of the United States Dwight Eisenhower's farewell address, warning about the dangers of the "military-industrial complex". The end of the song also features a quiet sample of "O Fortuna" in the background. The same music was sampled at the beginning of the first album in the Bush Trilogy, Houses of the Molé.

In an interview with Songfacts from 2012, Jourgensen reflected on the political aspect of the album:

"By the end of Last Sucker, I actually felt guilty and bad about bashing Bush. In Rio Grande Blood, I was all into it: this guy's evil. But by the end of Last Sucker, I was just like, this guy is in over his head. The oligarchy rules, and this guy plays with crayons and reads My Pet Goat. I mean, he's a blithering idiot. I protested him here in El Paso one time. I got within 10 feet of him. I can't believe the Secret Service let me get that close. And he was at a taco stand, like, 'I'll take one of them there enchiritos.' Well, there was no enchirito on the menu, and I don't even know what an enchirito is. But George W. was insistent, so they made him an enchirito, and I got to witness the whole thing and I started feeling sorry for him. What a dolt, man. This guy is so stupid, he can't be running the country. Cheney and the oligarchy is running the country. This guy just plays with Tonka trucks and orders enchiritos. I actually felt sorry for him."

=== Cover art ===
The limited edition digipak has an image of George W. Bush's face that morphs into a lizard creature's face and back when turned, an effect created through lenticular printing. The image is on a card that can be removed from the digipack.

The inner cover art contains a parody of Leonardo da Vinci's The Last Supper, with Jourgensen in the center of the table and figures from the Bush administration around him; Bush himself is drawn in Philip the Apostle's place.

== Track listing ==
No.	Title	Writer(s)	Length
1.	"Let's Go"	Al Jourgensen, Sin Quirin	4:53
2.	"Watch Yourself"	Jourgensen, Paul Raven	5:29
3.	"Life Is Good"	Jourgensen, Quirin	4:15
4.	"The Dick Song"	Jourgensen, Quirin	5:50
5.	"The Last Sucker"	Jourgensen, Tommy Victor	5:59
6.	"No Glory"	Jourgensen, Victor	3:42
7.	"Death & Destruction"	Jourgensen, Quirin	3:31
8.	"Roadhouse Blues" (Originally performed by The Doors)	Jim Morrison, Robby Krieger, John Densmore, Ray Manzarek	4:26
9.	"Die in a Crash"	Jourgensen, Victor, Burton C. Bell	4:03
10.	"End of Days (Pt. 1)"	Jourgensen, Victor, Raven, Bell	3:22
11.	"End of Days (Pt. 2)"	Jourgensen, Victor, Raven, Bell	10:25
Total length:			55:58

Best Buy/Deluxe edition bonus tracks
No.	Title	Length
23.	"Watch Yourself (The End Is Here)"	4:30
69.	"The Last Sucker" (Remix)	3:44

Miscellaneous bonus tracks
No.	Title	Length
12.	"Die in a Crash" (Remix, iTunes exclusive)	5:22
13.	"No Glory" (Remix, Napster only download)	4:49
14.	"Death & Destruction" (Remix, Japan bonus track)	5:09

== Personnel ==
=== Ministry ===
- Al Jourgensen - lead vocals, programming, guitars, bass (8), harmonica (8), drum programming (8), production
- Paul Raven - bass (2, 10, 11), guitars (2, 10, 11), backing vocals (2, 10, 11)
- Tommy Victor - guitars (5, 6, 9–11), bass (5, 6, 9–11), backing vocals (5, 6, 9–11)
- Sin Quirin - guitars (1, 3, 4, 7), bass (1, 3, 4, 7)
- John Bechdel - keyboards

=== Additional personnel ===
- Burton C. Bell - vocals (9–11)
- Josh Bradford - add. backing vocals (11)
- Angie Jay - add. backing vocals (11)
- Kevin Spence - intro vocals (8) add. backing vocals (6–11)
- Erin Braswell - add. backing vocals (11)
- Dave Donnelly - production, mastering
- John Bilberry - engineer, drum programming
- Lawton Outlaw - art direction, design, layout

== Chart positions ==
Chart (2007)	Peak position
German Albums (Offizielle Top 100)	95
US Billboard 200	130
US Hard Rock Albums (Billboard)	17
US Independent Albums (Billboard)	16

== Remix album ==
A remix album of dub remixes titled The Last Dubber was released on September 15, 2009.
