= Rio Grande Blood =

Studio album by Ministry
- Released: May 2, 2006
- Recorded: 2005
- Studios: 13th Planet Studios, El Paso, Texas
- Genres: Industrial metal; thrash metal
- Length: 49:24
- Labels: 13th Planet, Megaforce
- Producer: Al Jourgensen

Ministry chronology
Rantology (2005)	Rio Grande Blood (2006)	Rio Grande Dub (2007)

Professional ratings
Review scores
Source	Rating
AllMusic	3.5/5 stars
Collector's Guide to Heavy Metal	7/10
Pitchfork	6.4/10
PopMatters	8/10
Sputnikmusic	3.5/5 stars
Stylus	B−

Rio Grande Blood is the tenth studio album by American industrial metal band Ministry, released in 2006. It is their first release through 13th Planet and Megaforce Records.

== Overview ==
The album is the second installment in the band's anti-George W. Bush trilogy, preceded by 2004's Houses of the Molé and followed by 2007's The Last Sucker.

The title of the album is a parody of the 1972 ZZ Top album Rio Grande Mud.

Just like Houses of the Molé, Rio Grande Blood contains very political lyrics, making frequent allusions to the George W. Bush administration. The second track makes an explicit reference to Bush as Señor Peligro, which translates to "Mr. Danger" in Spanish. Some of the issues raised include the then-current Iraq War, U.S. immigration policy and U.S. military policy (particularly the United States Marine Corps in the song "Gangreen"). The Halliburton corporation is also quoted and linked to the Bush administration.

The album also contains allegations of the Bush administration complicity in the September 11 attacks in the track "Lieslieslies," which contains audio samples from the conspiracy documentary series Loose Change. The song received 6 nominations for Best Metal Performance at the 49th Grammy Awards.

A remix of the song "The Great Satan" from Rantology appears on this album. Along with "LiesLiesLies", "The Great Satan" was also nominated for a Grammy.

Samples of genuine Bush soundbites are cut-and-pasted together at various points to satirical effect: for example, the title track begins with Bush stating "I have adopted sophisticated terrorist tactics and I'm a dangerous, dangerous man with dangerous, dangerous weapons."

Jourgensen ranks Rio Grande Blood as his second-favorite Ministry album, saying that not only he liked the songs but he had a good time working with Paul Raven and Tommy Victor. He was also proud that some of the songs were used in the 2008 Academy Award winning film The Hurt Locker.

== Track listing ==
All tracks are written by Al Jourgensen and Tommy Victor, except where noted.

No.	Title	Writer(s)	Length
1.	"Rio Grande Blood"	Jourgensen	4:24
2.	"Señor Peligro"		3:38
3.	"Gangreen" (feat. Sgt. Major)		6:00
4.	"Fear (Is Big Business)"		4:51
5.	"LiesLiesLies"		5:16
6.	"The Great Satan" (Remix)	Jourgensen	3:09
7.	"Yellow Cake"	Jourgensen, Paul Raven	4:35
8.	"Palestina"		3:18
9.	"Ass Clown" (feat. Jello Biafra)	Jourgensen, Raven	6:42
10.	"Khyber Pass" (feat. Liz Constantine)	Jourgensen, Raven, Victor	7:31
Total length:			49:24

Japan bonus track
No.	Title	Length
11.	"LiesLiesLies" (Jungle Remixxx)	9:34

== Personnel ==
=== Ministry ===
- Al Jourgensen - lead vocals, lead guitar (1), guitars (1–3, 5–10), bass (1, 6), keyboards (1–10), drum programming (1, 6), production
- Tommy Victor - guitars (2–5, 7–10), bass (2–4)
- Paul Raven - keyboards (2, 3, 10), backing vocals (2, 3), bass (5, 7–10), guitars (7, 9, 10) drum programming (7, 9), drums (10)
- Mark Baker - drums (2, 3, 5, 8, 10)

=== Additional personnel ===
- Isaias Martinez - Latin vocals (2)
- Freddie Macias - background vocals (2, 3)
- Sgt. Major - drill instructor vocals (3, 13)
- Bobby Torres - background vocals (3)
- Jim Ward - background vocals (3)
- Justin Leeah - drum programming (4), engineering
- Mike Scaccia - lead guitar (6)
- Jello Biafra - intro vocals (9)
- Liz Constantine - additional vocals (10)
- John Gray - engineering
- John Bilberry - assistant engineering
- Dave Donnelly - mastering
- Lawton Outlaw - art direction, design, layout

== In popular culture ==
- The song "Palestina" is used in the skateboarding game Tony Hawk's Downhill Jam.
- The sound after the opening speech at the album's beginning is sampled from the track "Snagglepuss" by John Zorn.
- The song "Señor Peligro" is used in the video game Scarface: The World Is Yours.
- The song "Lieslieslies" is featured in the 2007 film Battle for Haditha.
- The songs "Lieslieslies" and "The Great Satan" are available as downloadable content for the video game Rock Band 2.
- The songs "Fear (Is Big Business)", "Palestina", and "Khyber Pass" were used in the Academy Award-winning 2009 film The Hurt Locker.

== Chart positions ==
Chart (2006)	Peak position
German Albums (Offizielle Top 100)	60
US Billboard 200	134
US Independent Albums (Billboard)	11
US Tastemakers Albums (Billboard)	12
US Top Internet Albums	134

== Remix album ==
A remix album of dub remixes titled Rio Grande Dub was released on July 10, 2007.

== Bibliography ==
- Jourgensen, Al & Wiederhorn, Jon (July 9, 2013). Ministry: The Lost Gospels According To Al Jourgensen (loan required). Boston, MA: Da Capo Press. ISBN 9780306822186. OCLC 811206550 – via the Internet Archive.
