= Mike Scaccia =

American musician

- Born: Michael Ralph Scaccia; June 14, 1965; Babylon, New York, U.S.
- Died: December 22, 2012 (aged 47) Fort Worth, Texas, U.S.
- Genres: Industrial metal; thrash metal; country; blues
- Instrument: Guitar
- Years active: 1983–2012
- Labels: 13th Planet; Sanctuary; Warner; Sire; Metal Blade; Capitol

Michael Ralph Scaccia (/ˈskɑːtʃə/ SKAH-tchə; June 14, 1965 – December 22, 2012) was an American musician, best known as a guitarist for several heavy metal and alternative rock acts, including Rigor Mortis, Ministry and Revolting Cocks.

== Life and career ==
Scaccia was born in Babylon, New York. He was of Italian descent and had three older sisters.

Scaccia's first band, Spectrum, was formed with high school friends Chuck and Chad Williams on guitar and bass, Johnny Carpenter on drums and Barry (Baron) Lane on vocals. Bruce Corbitt eventually replaced Barry Lane on vocals. Scaccia left Spectrum in late June 1982; the next year, he formed Rigor Mortis with schoolmates Harden Harrison and Casey Orr. Bruce Corbitt was added to the lineup on vocals in the summer of 1986. Within five years they landed a major label deal with Capitol Records in 1987. In 1988, Rigor Mortis released their self-titled debut album via the label.

In 1989, Scaccia was asked by Al Jourgensen to join his band Ministry for their 1989–1990 The Mind is a Terrible Thing to Taste tour. Jourgensen was impressed by Scaccia's talents that he included him into the band full-time. Scaccia left Rigor Mortis in 1991. He then went on to record and tour for Ministry's next album, Psalm 69, throughout 1992. He also played on their Lollapalooza tour.

Throughout 1994–1995, recording began on the Ministry's follow-up to Psalm 69..., Filth Pig. They relocated to Austin, Texas, where sessions took place. Amidst the recording, on August 29, 1995, Scaccia was arrested at a Wal-Mart for heroin possession. He was originally confronted because he resembled an armed-robbery suspect and was carrying a case that they thought might contain a gun. They found heroin in the case instead. Scaccia was arrested and then released on $2,500 bail. He left the band right after completing Filth Pig, in an attempt to rid off his addiction.

In 2003, Rigor Mortis, with Scaccia in the lineup, reformed in Texas to positive reviews. Also at this time, a sober Jourgensen again asked him to rejoin for touring their new album, Animositisomina. He agreed, but left the Ministry again in 2006 before rejoining with Al Jourgensen in the studio to record what would be Relapse, which was scheduled to tour in the summer of 2012. It was confirmed that Scaccia had been working with the original members of Rigor Mortis as they worked on their first album in 20 years.

Scaccia collapsed onstage shortly after 11:30 pm on December 22, 2012, at The Rail Club in Fort Worth, Texas, where he was performing as part of the 50th birthday celebrations for Bruce Corbitt, the singer for Rigor Mortis; he died onstage between 11:36 pm and 11:40 pm. He was officially pronounced dead at a local hospital shortly after midnight on December 23. Although initial reports suggested a seizure possibly caused by the strobe lighting at the venue, the coroner indicated the cause of death to be a sudden heart attack brought on by heart disease. He was 47. A memorial service was held for Scaccia on Sunday, December 30, at the Aristide Event and Conference Center in Mansfield, Texas.

== Personal discography ==
With Rigor Mortis

- Rigor Mortis (1988)
- Freaks EP (1989)
- Rigor Mortis Vs. The Earth (1991)
- Slave to the Grave (2014)

With Ministry

- In Case You Didn't Feel Like Showing Up (1990)
- Psalm 69: The Way to Succeed and the Way to Suck Eggs (1992)
- Filth Pig (1996)
- Greatest Fits (2001)
- Houses of the Molé (2004)
- Rio Grande Blood (2006)
- Cover Up (2008)
- Relapse (2012)
- From Beer to Eternity (2013)

With Revolting Cocks

- Linger Ficken' Good...And Other Barnyard Oddities (1993)
- Cocked and Loaded (2006)

With Lard

- Pure Chewing Satisfaction (1997)
- 70's Rock Must Die (2000)

With 1000 Homo DJs

- Supernaut (1990)

With Skrew

- Burning in Water, Drowning in Flame (1992)

With League of Blind Women

- League of Blind Women (1998)

With Buck Satan and the 666 Shooters

- Bikers Welcome Ladies Drink Free (2011)

Various artists compilation

- Lucio Fulci: A Symphony of Fear (1999)

== Bibliography ==
- Gregory, Hugh (1994). 1000 Great Guitarists. San Francisco: GPI Books. p. 124. ISBN 0-87930-307-7 – via the Internet Archive.
- Jourgensen, Al & Wiederhorn, Jon (July 9, 2013). Ministry: The Lost Gospels According To Al Jourgensen (loan required). Boston, MA: Da Capo Press. ISBN 9780306822186 – via the Internet Archive.
