= 13th Planet Records =

American record label

- Founded: 2005; 20 years ago
- Founder: Al Jourgensen
- Distributor(s): Sony Music Entertainment; RED Distribution
- Genre: Heavy metal, industrial, rock, electronic
- Country of origin: United States
- Location: El Paso, Texas

13th Planet Records is an American record label founded by Ministry frontman Al Jourgensen in October 2005. In addition to its function as an artist-run, artist-friendly independent label, 13th Planet encompasses several realms of the music industry including artist management, touring (including 2008's "C U LaTouR"), music publishing as well as a full-scale rehearsal and recording studio.

The label is a joint venture with Megaforce Records in the United States and Canada and is distributed through Sony Music Entertainment/RED Distribution.

== Artists ==
- Ministry
- RevCo
- Prong
- Ascension of the Watchers
- Buck Satan and the 666 Shooters
- DethRok
- False Icons
- ReVamp

== Releases ==
- Cocked and Loaded (2006) – Revolting Cocks
- Rio Grande Blood (2006) – Ministry
- Cocktail Mixxx (2007) – Revolting Cocks
- Rio Grande Dub (2007) – Ministry
- The Last Sucker (2007) – Ministry
- Power of the Damager (2007) – Prong
- Numinosum (2008) – Ascension of the Watchers
- Cover Up (2008) – Ministry & Co-Conspirators
- God Complex (2008) – False Icons
- The Wicked Soundtrack (2008) – Various artists
- Sex-O Olympic-O (2009) – RevCo
- Adios... Puta Madres (2009) – Ministry
- Power of the Damn Mixxxer (2009) – Prong
- The Last Dubber (2009) – Ministry
- Sex-O MiXXX-O (2009) – RevCo
- It's Always Christmas Time (2009, Single) – Al Jourgensen (with Mark Thwaite)
- Got Cock? (2010) – RevCo
- Voices in My Head (2010) – Al Jourgensen
- MiXXXes of the Molé (2010) – Ministry
- Undercover (2010) – Ministry
- Bikers Welcome Ladies Drink Free (2011) – Buck Satan and the 666 Shooters
- Relapse (2012) – Ministry
- From Beer to Eternity (2013) – Ministry
- Us & Them (2013) – DethRok
