= Al Jourgensen =

Cuban-American musician (born 1958)

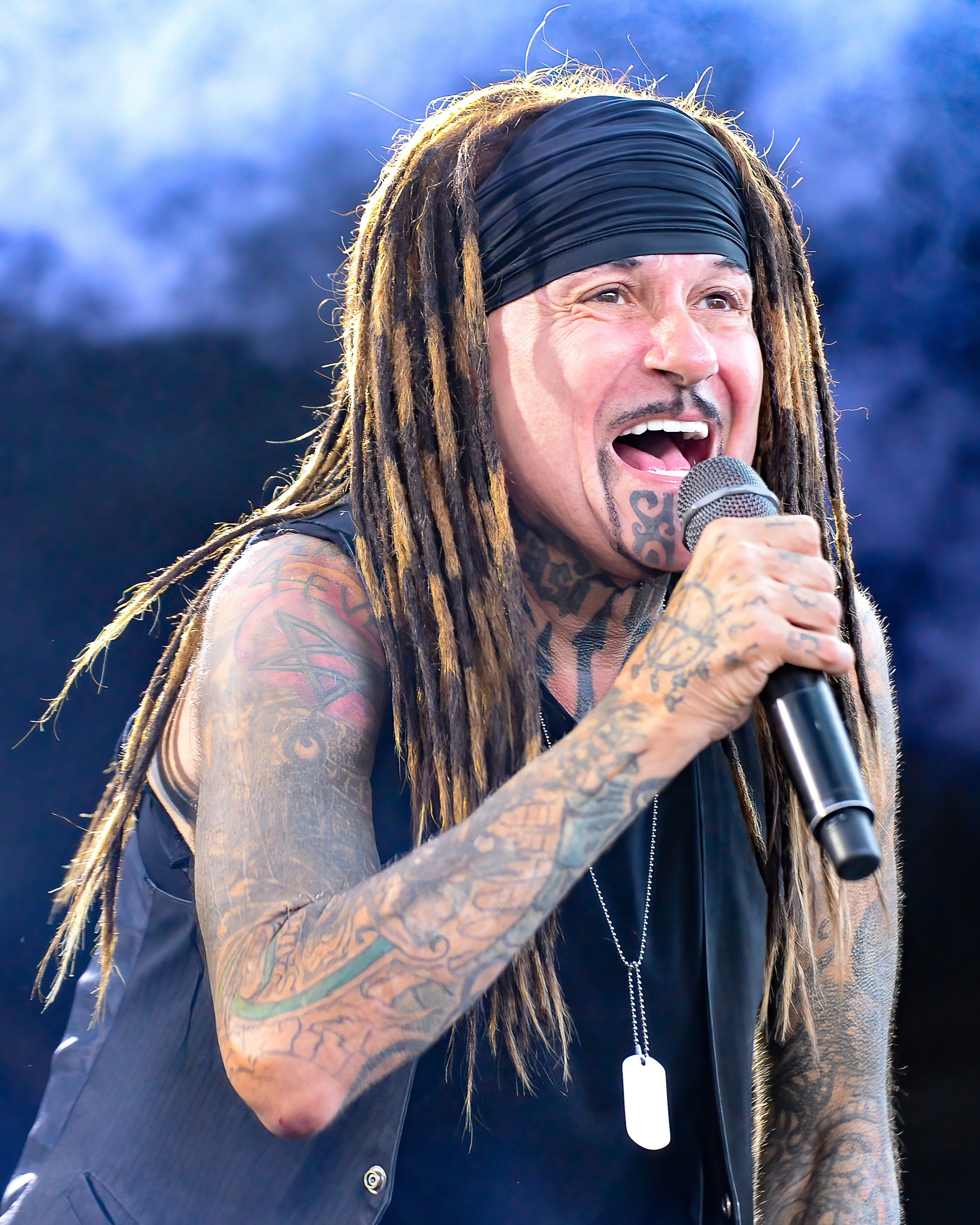
- Jourgensen performing with Ministry in West Palm Beach, Florida in 2023

Background information
- Also known as: The Alien, Alien Jourgensen, Aloysius Jourgensen, Alain Jourgensen, Hypo Luxa, Dog, Alien Dog Star, Buck Satan, Buck Santa, Uncle Al, Enchanted Al, Al F***-ing Jourgensen
- Born: Alejandro Ramírez Casas; October 9, 1958 (age 68); Havana, Cuba
- Genres: Industrial metal; industrial rock; synth-pop (early); new wave (early)
- Occupations: Musician; singer; songwriter; record producer
- Instruments: Vocals; guitar; keyboards; bass; drums
- Years active: 1978–present
- Member of: Ministry; Revolting Cocks; Lard; Buck Satan and the 666 Shooters; Surgical Meth Machine
- Formerly of: 1000 Homo DJs; PTP; Acid Horse; Pailhead; Special Affect
- Website: ministryband.com

Alain David Jourgensen (Note: He is sometimes credited and referred to as Alain Jourgensen, Alien Jourgensen, Uncle Al, Hypo Luxa (his alias as a producer), Dog, Alien Dog Star, and Buck Satan.) (born Alejandro Ramírez Casas; October 9, 1958) is a Cuban-American singer, musician and music producer, closely related to the independent record label Wax Trax! Records. His musical career spans nearly five decades. He is the frontman and lyricist of the industrial metal band Ministry, which he founded in 1981 and of which he remains the only constant member. He was the primary musician of several Ministry-related projects, such as Revolting Cocks, Lard, and Buck Satan and the 666 Shooters. Jourgensen is a prominent figure in industrial music, influencing numerous other groups and musicians, both in alternative and industrial-associated acts.

Born in Havana shortly before the Cuban Revolution of 1959, at the age of three Jourgensen moved to the United States with his family, and was raised mainly in Chicago and Breckenridge, Colorado. He developed an interest in music at a young age, and was involved in several short-lived bands, as well as briefly performing in the backing band of drag performer Divine.

Jourgensen formed Ministry in 1981 in Chicago and received significant attention from music press regarding the band's 1983 debut studio album, With Sympathy. His subsequent releases in the 1980s, most prominently Ministry's The Land of Rape and Honey (1988) and The Mind Is a Terrible Thing to Taste (1989), showcased his stylistic transition; in the early 1990s, he achieved mainstream success with Ministry's fifth studio album, Psalm 69: The Way to Succeed and the Way to Suck Eggs (1992). The next few years were marked by publicity surrounding Jourgensen's substance abuse which negatively affected his creative output and resulted in a period of severe depression; during this time, Jourgensen and Ministry appeared in the 2001 Steven Spielberg film A.I. Artificial Intelligence.

In 2005, Jourgensen established his own record label, 13th Planet Records, through which several Ministry records, among others, were released until the early 2010s. As of 2025, Jourgensen and Ministry are signed to Cleopatra Records.

== Early life ==
Alejandro Ramírez Casas was born in Havana, Cuba, on October 9, 1958, the son of Margarita "Maggie" Brouwer (born c. 1942) Jourgensen, who is of Dutch and Spanish heritage, says he does not remember anything about his real father. In 1961, following the fall of Fulgencio Batista's regime and rise of Fidel Castro to power, his family relocated to the US. In 1964, Brouwer married Ed Jourgensen, a stock car driver and mechanic for Formula One driver Dan Gurney. She adopted his surname, which is Norwegian, for herself and her son.

Jourgensen was raised in Chicago, Illinois, and Breckenridge, Colorado, attending Greeley High School and Summit County High School in Frisco, Colorado, graduating in 1976. He was a fan of a wide range of artists including the Beatles, Pink Floyd, Hawkwind, Led Zeppelin, Hank Williams, and George Jones. After seeing the Ramones on stage in Denver, Jourgensen decided to be a punk musician. In the early 1980s, Jourgensen drew inspiration from the post-punk bands Gang of Four and Joy Division, as well as electronic acts like New Order, Simple Minds, the Human League, Orchestral Manoeuvres in the Dark, and D.A.F.

Jourgensen eventually attended the University of Illinois Chicago, after briefly enrolling at both the University of Northern Colorado and the University of Colorado.

== Professional life ==
=== Ministry ===
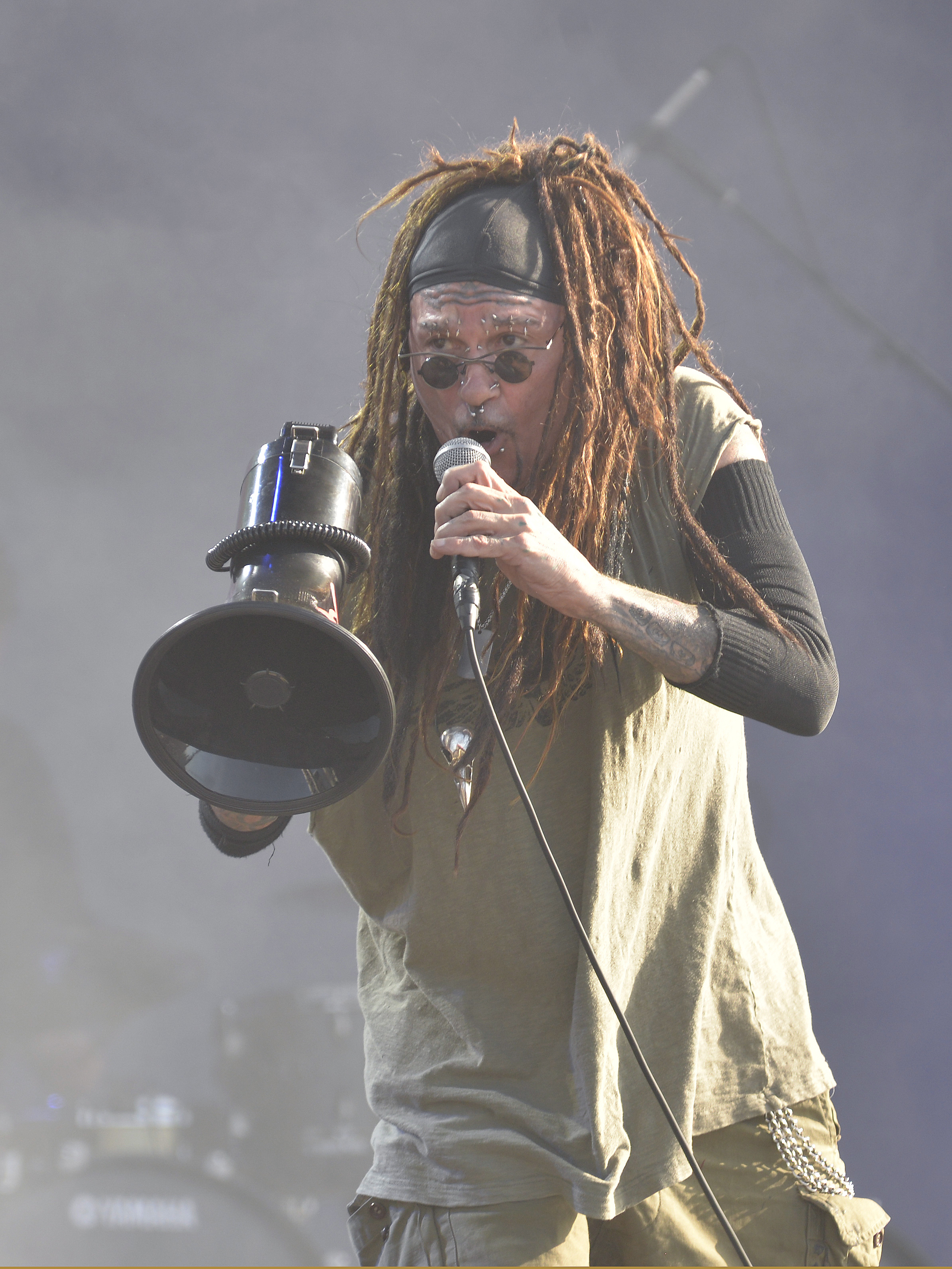
Jourgensen with Ministry at Hellfest 2017

Jourgensen formed Ministry in 1981 after leaving Special Affect, a post-punk band that included Frankie Nardiello, founding member (as Groovie Mann) of My Life With The Thrill Kill Kult and drummer Harry Rushakoff of Concrete Blonde). Early singles by Ministry and Jourgensen's other projects were released on Wax Trax! Records. He also produced Skinny Puppy's Rabies album. During that time, Jourgensen befriended Nivek Ogre, who later toured with Ministry.

The band broke into the mainstream with 1992's Psalm 69: The Way to Succeed and the Way to Suck Eggs album. Its opening track, "N.W.O.", was nominated for a 1993 Grammy Award for Best Metal Performance, losing to Nine Inch Nails' "Wish". However, its next album, Filth Pig (1996), divided their fan base, leading to a commercial decline that became evident when Warner Bros. Records dropped them from the label in 2001.

Ministry's next albums, Rio Grande Blood (2006) and The Last Sucker (2007), as well as the 2006 Revolting Cocks album Cocked and Loaded, were released on Jourgensen's new record label, 13th Planet Records, which he formed after falling out with the mainstream agendas of major industry labels.

At the specific request of director Stanley Kubrick, Jourgensen appeared with Ministry in the film A.I.: Artificial Intelligence. He related his conversation with Kubrick in an interview:

Well, first of all, I hung up on him. I thought it was a crank call. His secretary was calling and I was like, 'Yeah, right.' Click. And then he called back personally and then talked to me, and I was just freaked out. I mean, who wouldn't be freaked out? Here's this eccentric American God living in the countryside of England, and he's calling me up in Austin, Texas, and saying he wants me to do the music for his film and he wants me to be in his film and he's famous and all that. I didn't even believe it.

Ministry continued its involvement with the film project after Kubrick's death, and Jourgensen revealed that after initial tension with Steven Spielberg, partly due to Jourgensen's prank when he claimed being told that "A.I." stood for "Anal Intruder" and threatening to walk off production because it was not a porn film, he and Spielberg enjoyed a friendly relationship, with two compositions appearing on the soundtrack: "What About Us" and "Dead Practice".

A number of his songs also appear in other films, such as Wicked Lake (2008)—produced by Fever Dreams and ZP Studios—for which he composed the entire soundtrack that was released on his own 13th Planet record label—he also makes a small appearance in the film as an art school teacher.

In a November 2008 issue of Hustler Magazine, Jourgensen announced that Ministry was officially finished, as the band "[took] up so much time" and releasing new albums was difficult. He also explained that he was responsible for six other bands and could complete seven albums within a year when he was not working on new Ministry material. However, despite Jourgensen's insistence that Ministry would never return, a reunion was announced on August 7, 2011. A new album, entitled Relapse, was released on March 26, 2012.

At his 57th birthday listening party in Chicago he announced a new project called, SMM or Surgical Meth Machine. In an interview with In The Loop Magazine, Jourgensen stated, "I can't wait to get this record out. If you're a fan of Ministry, you're gonna freak out on this. It's got the whole range of my career as a musician in it even sound of earlier stuff from the beginning."

In 2016 March, Jourgensen noted he had a project with Arabian Prince; this collaboration was later confirmed for a new Ministry album.

In February 2024, Jourgensen announced that he would like to make one last Ministry album. That pending swan song will also find the outfit reuniting with Paul Barker, who served as their producer/bassist/keyboardist/programmer, etc. throughout Ministry‘s commercial peak from 1986 through to 2003.

=== Revolting Cocks ===
Revolting Cocks, also known as RevCo, is an American industrial rock band that began as a musical side project for Richard 23 of Front 242, Luc van Acker, and Jourgensen. The band took their name after being involved in a fight in a Chicago bar in 1983: Jourgensen, Richard 23 and Van Acker, celebrating the formation of their new band with a few drinks, ended the evening in a brawl, with bar stools thrown through the windows. As he ejected the trio, the owner—a man who Jourgensen recalls was named Dess—shouted, "I'm calling the police! You guys are a bunch of revolting cocks!" The trio decided to use the name for their band.

The band have changed lineups several times. RevCo currently features Jourgensen (guitars, keyboards, programming, background vocals, producer), Josh Bradford (vocals, background vocals), Sin Quirin (guitars, bass, keyboards) and Clayton Worbeck (keyboards, programming, mixing, bass). Their seventh album, Sex-O Olympic-O, which was produced by Jourgensen at his studio, was released on his 13th Planet label in March 2008. The follow-up album, Got Cock?, was released in March 2010 on the same label. A remix album of Got Cock?, titled Got Mixxx?, was released in 2011.

=== Other bands and projects ===
During the late 1980s, Jourgensen started a short-lived side project named 1000 Homo DJs, under the pseudonym Buck Satan. 1000 Homo DJs released two singles, including a cover of Black Sabbath's "Supernaut." Also in 1989, Jourgensen was involved in Acid Horse, a collaboration between the members of Ministry and Cabaret Voltaire. In 2015, Jourgensen announced that he started "a speed metal project" named Surgical Meth Machine with engineer and longtime collaborator Sam D'Ambruoso. The project's self-titled album was released on April 15, 2016.

More side projects

- Special Affect
- W.E.L.T.
- Pailhead
- Lard
- Surgical Meth Machine

=== Production work ===
Jourgensen and his Ministry bandmate Paul Barker worked as a music production team under the names Hypo Luxa and Hermes Pan, producing their own work as well as other Wax Trax! Records acts. Jourgensen also produced music for Reverend Horton Heat, Skinny Puppy, Dessau, Skrew, Rigor Mortis, The Blackouts, and DethRok. Jourgensen's recording complex for the 13th Planet label was located at his former home in El Paso, Texas.

== Musicianship ==
Jourgensen has played a multitude of instruments throughout his career, including guitars, bass, violin, banjo, keyboards, piano, pedal steel guitar, trumpets and drums to name a few. However, he claims he is "not really good at any of them." He said, "I'm jack of all trades and master of none. But I can collage bits and pieces together musically."

Jourgensen's singing style has varied throughout the years. On Ministry's early releases such as With Sympathy and Twitch, he sang with a fake British accent, which he regrets. Inspired by The 13th Floor Elevators, Jourgensen started utilizing vocal effects beginning with The Land of Rape and Honey to distort his voice using Eventide. In 2006, starting with Rio Grande Blood, Jourgensen switched to a more thrash metal approach.

== Personal life ==
=== Relationships and family ===
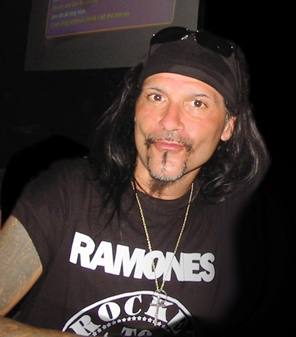
Jourgensen at the Astoria, London during 2004, promoting Houses of the Molé

Jourgensen was married to Patty Marsh from 1984 to 1995, and has one daughter named Adrienne. In 2002, he married Angelina Lukacin. In July 2014, he announced that they were divorced.

Jourgensen's autobiography, Ministry: The Lost Gospels According to Al Jourgensen, was released in July 2013.

=== Legal and health issues ===
In 1995, police raided Ministry's Texas headquarters and Jourgensen was arrested for possession of heroin. He received a five-year probation sentence. Jourgensen was dependent upon heroin for twenty years. Jourgensen kicked his heavy drug (heroin, methadone, crack, pills) habit, and as of 2019, he has limited his intake to beer, marijuana, and psilocybin mushrooms. In a November 2026 interview with Kerrang!, Jourgensen attributed his quitting of heroin to an encounter with David Bowie during the recording of Dark Side of the Spoon.

Jourgensen almost lost his arm and foot in two separate incidents, the first due to a spider bite, the second the result of a hypodermic needle wound.

=== Body art ===
Throughout the years, Jourgensen has amassed a large number of tattoos. In 2012, he underwent facial piercings after a bet with his daughter; she called him a "pussy" for not having any piercings, while Jourgensen called her the same thing for not having any tattoos. They then decided to have their tattoos and piercings done respectively to create a "pact". He had 16 facial piercings done in one sitting.

== Discography ==
=== with Ministry ===
Date of release	Title	Label
1983	With Sympathy	Arista Records
1986	Twitch	Sire/Warner Bros.
1988	The Land of Rape and Honey	Sire/Warner Bros.
1989	The Mind Is a Terrible Thing to Taste	Sire/Warner Bros.
1992	Psalm 69: The Way to Succeed and the Way to Suck Eggs	Sire/Warner Bros.
1996	Filth Pig	Warner Bros.
1999	Dark Side of the Spoon	Warner Bros.
2003	Animositisomina	Sanctuary
2004	Houses of the Molé	Sanctuary
2006	Rio Grande Blood	13th Planet/Megaforce
2007	The Last Sucker	13th Planet/Megaforce
2012	Relapse	13th Planet
2013	From Beer to Eternity	13th Planet
2018	AmeriKKKant	Nuclear Blast
2021	Moral Hygiene	Nuclear Blast
2024	Hopiumforthemasses	Nuclear Blast
2026	Hate to Go – Take Out or Delivery	Cleopatra Records

=== with Revolting Cocks ===
Date of release	Title	Label
1985	No Devotion (12")	Wax Trax!
1986	Big Sexy Land	Wax Trax!
1986	"You Often Forget" (12")	Wax Trax!
1988	Live! You Goddamned Son of a Bitch	Wax Trax!
1986	Stainless Steel Providers (12")	Wax Trax!
1990	Beers, Steers, and Queers	Wax Trax!
1993	Linger Ficken' Good	Sire/Reprise/Warner Bros. Records
2006	Cocked and Loaded	13th Planet Records/Megaforce Records
2007	Cocktail Mixxx	13th Planet Records/Megaforce Records
2009	Sex-O Olympic-O	13th Planet Records/Megaforce Records
2009	Sex-O MiXXX-O	13th Planet Records/Megaforce Records
2010	Got Cock?	13th Planet Records/Megaforce Records
2011	Got Mixx?	13th Planet Records/Megaforce Records

=== with Lard ===
Date of release	Title	Label
1989	The Power of Lard	Alternative Tentacles
1990	The Last Temptation of Reid	Alternative Tentacles
1997	Pure Chewing Satisfaction	Alternative Tentacles
2000	70's Rock Must Die	Alternative Tentacles

=== Other releases ===
Date of release	Band	Title	Label
1987	Pailhead	"I Will Refuse" b/w "No Bunny"	Wax Trax!
1988	Pailhead	Trait (EP)	Wax Trax!
1989	Acid Horse	No Name, No Slogan (12")	Wax Trax!
2011	Buck Satan and the 666 Shooters	Bikers Welcome Ladies Drink Free	13th Planet Records/AFM Soulfood Records
2016	Surgical Meth Machine	Surgical Meth Machine	Nuclear Blast Records

=== Featured releases ===
Date of release	Band	Title	Label	Notes
1981	Special Affect	Too Much Soft Living	None (Special Affect Music)	Full member (1979-1980).
1983	Alan Vega	Saturn Strip	Elektra	Keyboards on Saturn Drive (track 1).
1989	Skinny Puppy	Rabies	Nettwerk	Production, engineering, mixing, guitar and additional vocals.
1992	Skrew	Burning in Water, Drowning in Flame	Metal Blade	Engineering and guitar.
1994	The Reverend Horton Heat	Liquor in the Front	Sub Pop / Interscope	Production, pedal steel guitar, piano and vocals.
2008	False Icons	God Complex	13th Planet Records	Mixing and production.
2009	Prong	Power of the Damager	13th Planet Records	Keyboards on The Banishment (track 6).
2010	Front Line Assembly	Improvised Electronic Device	Metropolis	Production, vocals, lyrics, string arrangements, additional programming and mixing on Stupidity (track 9).
2015	Coal Chamber	Rivals	Napalm	Additional vocals on Suffer in Silence (track 4).
2018	Beauty In Chaos	Finding Beauty In Chaos	None (Bandcamp)	Vocals on 20th Century Boy, originally composed by T. rex (track 4)
2020	Static-X	Project Regeneration	Otsego Entertainment Group	Additional vocals on Dead Souls (track 12).

=== Solo releases ===
Date of release	Title	Label
2009 / 2010	Alien Christmas/It's Always Christmas Time (with Mark Thwaite)	13th Planet Records
