= Ministry discography =

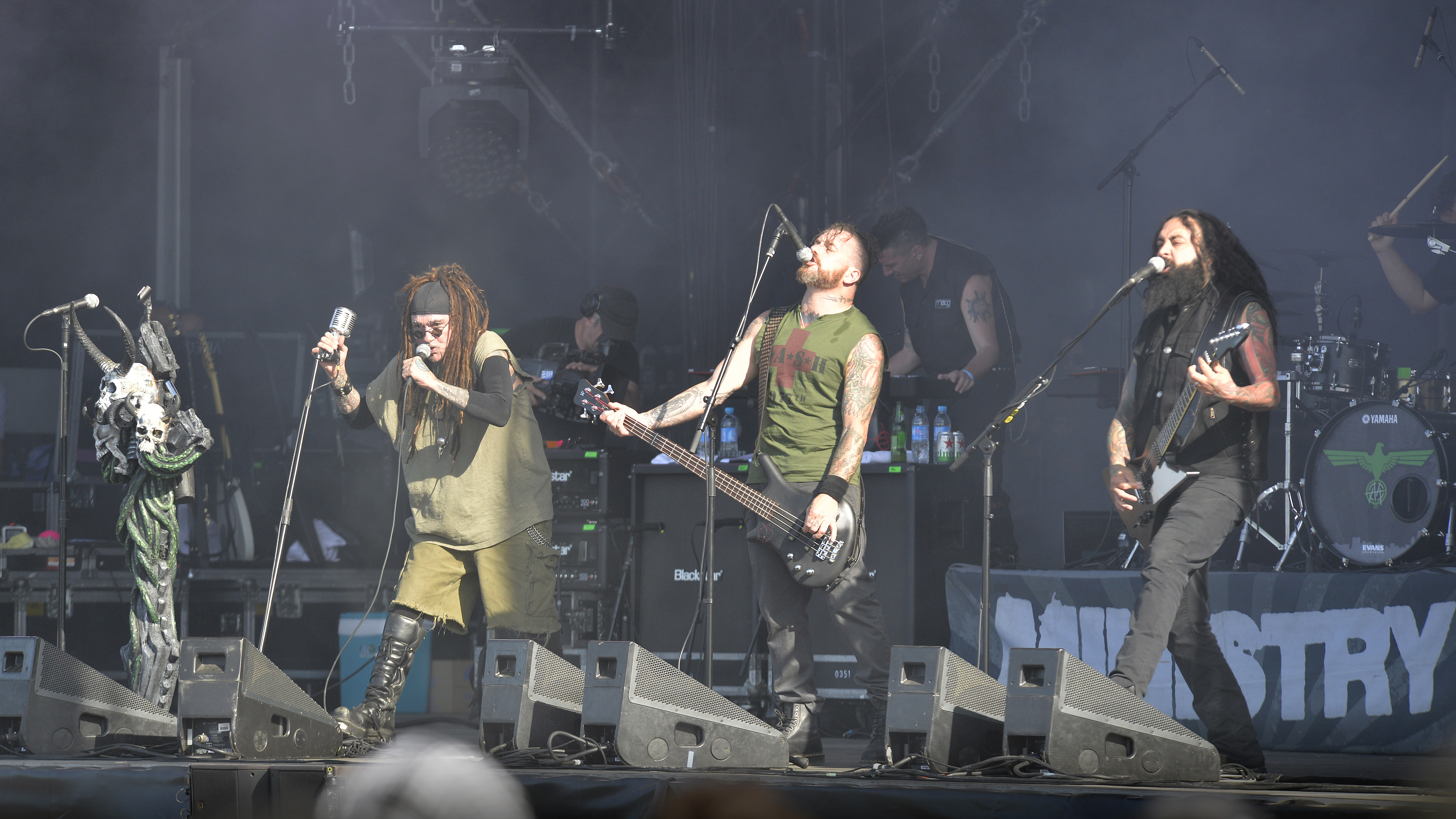
- Ministry performing at the 2017 Hellfest
- Studio albums: 17
- Live albums: 8
- Compilation albums: 14
- Singles: 30
- Video albums: 5
- Music videos: 20

As of 2026, the discography of American industrial metal band Ministry, which was founded and is fronted by Al Jourgensen, consists of seventeen studio albums, eight live albums, fourteen compilation and remix albums, thirty singles, five video albums (including video versions of live albums) and twenty music videos. Several tracks spanning from 1981 to 1994 in studio, live and cover formats have remained unreleased by the band.

Formed in 1981, the band made their recording debut with the single "I'm Falling / Cold Life", released by Wax Trax! Records in the US and Situation Two in the UK, respectively. Signing a short-lived contract with Arista Records, the band released their debut studio album, With Sympathy, which hit the upper 90s in the Billboard 200, in May 1983. Following a departure from Arista, Ministry returned on Wax Trax!, where several singles—including the club hit "(Every Day Is) Halloween"—were released in 1984–1985. After signing a deal with Sire Records in 1985, the band released the single “Over the Shoulder”, which was followed by the album Twitch in March 1986; co-produced by Jourgensen and Adrian Sherwood, Twitch hit No. 194 in the Billboard 200 and was regarded by profile commentators as a turning point in Ministry's artistic style.

In 1988–89, Ministry releases The Land of Rape and Honey and The Mind Is a Terrible Thing to Taste. Both positively received by music press, these two albums hit the upper 160s in the Billboard 200, and were certified gold by RIAA. During the tour in support of The Mind Is a Terrible Thing to Taste, the band recorded their debut live album, In Case You Didn't Feel Like Showing Up, released in 1990.

== Albums ==
=== Studio albums ===
Year	Album details	Peak chart positions											Sales	Certifications
Year	Album details	US	CAN	AUS	AUT	FRA	GER	NZ	NOR	SWE	SWI	UK	Sales	Certifications
1983	With Sympathy: Released: May 10, 1983; Label: Arista/BMG	96	—	—	—	—	—	—	—	—	—	—	US: 103,484+	
1986	Twitch: Released: March 12, 1986; Label: Sire/Warner Bros.	194	97	—	—	—	—	—	—	—	—	—	US: 138,755+	
1988	The Land of Rape and Honey: Released: October 11, 1988; Label: Sire/Warner Bros.	164	—	—	—	—	—	—	—	—	—	—		US: Gold
1989	The Mind Is a Terrible Thing to Taste: Released: November 14, 1989; Label: Sire/Warner Bros.	163	38	—	—	—	—	—	—	—	—	—		US: Gold
1992	Psalm 69: The Way to Succeed and the Way to Suck Eggs: Released: July 14, 1992; Label: Sire/Warner Bros.	27	22	54	—	—	69	24	—	—	—	33		US: Platinum; AUS: Gold; CAN: Gold
1996	Filth Pig: Released: January 30, 1996; Label: Warner Bros.	19	5	9	47	—	28	16	38	7	50	43	US: 236,557+	
1999	Dark Side of the Spoon: Released: June 8, 1999; Label: Warner Bros.	92	—	98	—	—	57	—	—	51	—	85	US: 79,459+	
2003	Animositisomina: Released: February 18, 2003; Label: Sanctuary/BMG	157	—	—	—	125	93	—	—	—	—	186	US: 46,319+	
2004	Houses of the Molé: Released: June 22, 2004; Label: Sanctuary/BMG	—	—	—	—	162	—	—	—	—	—	135	US: 45,419+	
2006	Rio Grande Blood: Released: May 2, 2006; Label: 13th Planet/Megaforce	134	—	—	—	—	60	—	—	—	—	—	US: 34,346+	
2007	The Last Sucker: Released: September 18, 2007; Label: 13th Planet/Megaforce	130	—	—	—	—	95	—	—	—	—	—	US: 5,140+	
2012	Relapse: Released: March 23, 2012; Label: 13th Planet	193	—	—	—	—	72	—	—	56	99	—	US: 5,000+	
2013	From Beer to Eternity: Released: September 10, 2013; Label: 13th Planet	140	—	—	—	—	79	—	—	—	—	—		
2018	AmeriKKKant: Released: March 9, 2018; Label: Nuclear Blast	—	—	—	73	189	57	—	—	—	65	—		
2021	Moral Hygiene: Released: October 1, 2021; Label: Nuclear Blast	—	—	—	65	—	33	—	—	—	64	—		
2024	Hopiumforthemasses: Released: March 1, 2024; Label: Nuclear Blast	—	—	—	46	—	30	—	—	—	49	—		
2026	Hate to Go – Take Out or Delivery: Released: October 30, 2026; Label: Cleopatra	—	—	—	—	—	91	—	—	—	63	—		
"—" denotes releases that did not chart.

=== Live albums ===
Year	Album details	AUS	UK	Sales
1990	In Case You Didn't Feel Like Showing Up: Released September 4, 1990; Label: Sire/Warner Bros.	—	—	US: 196,225
1995	Just Another Fix: Released January 1, 1995; Label: Warner Bros.	21	—	US: 1,130
2002	Sphinctour: Released April 9, 2002; Label: Sanctuary/BMG	—	—	US: 12,113
2009	Adios... Puta Madres: Released March 31, 2009; Label: 13th Planet	—	—	
2013	Enjoy the Quiet—Live at Wacken 2012: Released August 27, 2013; Label: UDR/EMI	—	33	
2014	Last Tangle in Paris / Live 2012 Defibrila Tour: Released July 8, 2014; Label: UDR	—	—	
2015	Toronto 1986: Released May 22, 2015; Label: Cleopatra			
2017	Live Necronomicon: Released July, 2017; Label: Cleopatra			
2019	Chicago/Detroit 1982: Released September 27, 2019; Label: Cleopatra			
"—" denotes releases that did not chart.

=== Compilation and remix albums ===
Year	Album details	Sales
1987	Twelve Inch Singles (1981–1984): Released: 1987; Label: Wax Trax!	US: 113,646
1993	Box: Released: November 30, 1993; Label: Warner Bros.	
2001	Greatest Fits: Released: June 19, 2001; Label: Warner Bros.	US: 89,283
2003	Twitched (unauthorised release): Released: 2003; Label: Radioactive	
2004	Early Trax: Released: October 12, 2004; Label: Rykodisc	US: 7,555
2004	Side Trax: Released: October 12, 2004; Label: Rykodisc	US: 9,205
2005	Rantology: Released: September 27, 2005; Label: Sanctuary/BMG	US: 12,868
2007	Rio Grande Dub: Released: July 10, 2007; Label: 13th Planet	US: 9,750
2008	Cover Up: Released: April 1, 2008; Label: 13th Planet	US: 1,400
2009	The Last Dubber: Released: September 15, 2009; Label: 13th Planet	
2010	MiXXXes of the Molé: Released: August 17, 2010; Label: 13th Planet	
2010	Every Day Is Halloween: The Anthology: Released: October 5, 2010; Label: Cleopatra	
2010	Undercover: Released: December 7, 2010; Label: 13th Planet	
2011	Very Best of Fixes and Remixes: Released: November 9, 2011; Label: Cleopatra	
2016	Trax! Rarities: Released: December 9, 2016; Label: Cleopatra	
2020	Everyday (Is Halloween) - The Lost Mixes: Released: October 30, 2020; Label: Cleopatra	
2024	Ultimate Rarest Trax! 1981-1986: Released: January 19, 2024; Label: Cleopatra	
2025	The Squirrely Years Revisited: Released: March 28, 2025; Label: Cleopatra	

== Singles ==
Year	Song	Peak chart positions					Album
Year	Song	^{US Alt.}	^{US Dance}	^{NZ}	^{SWE}	^{UK}	Album
1981	"I'm Falling / Cold Life"	—	45	—	—	—	Non-album single
1983	"Work for Love"	—	20	—	—	115	With Sympathy
1983	"I Wanted to Tell Her"	—	13	35	—	150	With Sympathy
1983	"Revenge"	—	—	—	—	172	With Sympathy
1985	"All Day"	—	—	—	—	—	Non-album single
1985	"Nature of Love"	—	—	—	—	—	Non-album single
1985	"(Every Day Is) Halloween"	—	—	—	—	—	Non-album single
1985	"Over the Shoulder"	—	—	—	—	—	Twitch
1988	"Stigmata"	—	—	—	—	—	The Land of Rape and Honey
1989	"Burning Inside"	23	—	—	—	—	The Mind Is a Terrible Thing to Taste
1990	"So What"	—	—	—	—	—	The Mind Is a Terrible Thing to Taste
1991	"Jesus Built My Hotrod"	19	34	—	—	94	Psalm 69: The Way to Succeed and the Way to Suck Eggs
1992	"N.W.O."	11	—	—	—	49	Psalm 69: The Way to Succeed and the Way to Suck Eggs
1993	"Just One Fix"	—	—	—	—	—	Psalm 69: The Way to Succeed and the Way to Suck Eggs
1995	"The Fall" (Note: "The Fall" did not enter the Billboard Hot 100, but peaked at number 15 on the Bubbling Under Hot 100 Singles chart.)	—	18	—	46	53	Filth Pig
1996	"Lay Lady Lay"	—	—	—	—	128	Filth Pig
1996	"Reload"	—	—	—	—	—	Filth Pig
1997	"Brick Windows"	—	—	—	—	—	Filth Pig
1999	"Bad Blood"	—	—	—	—	—	Dark Side of the Spoon
2001	"What About Us?	—	—	—	—	—	Greatest Fits
2003	"Piss"	—	—	—	—	—	Animositisomina
2004	"No W"	—	—	—	—	—	Houses of the Molé
2008	"Keys to the City"	—	—	—	—	—	Non-album single
2010	"Thunderstruck"	—	—	—	—	—	Undercover
2011	"99 Percenters"	—	—	—	—	—	Relapse
2012	"Double Tap"	—	—	—	—	—	Relapse
2013	"Permawar"	—	—	—	—	—	From Beer to Eternity
2017	"Dancing Madly Backwards" (Note: "Dancing Maldy Backwards" was released as a split single featuring the versions of the title track, recorded separately by Peter Hook and Ministry, respectively.)	—	—	—	—	—	Non-album single
2020	"Alert Level"	—	—	—	—	—	Moral Hygiene
2023	"Goddamn White Trash"	—	—	—	—	—	Hopiumforthemasses
"—" denotes releases that did not chart.

== Unreleased tracks ==
Year	Song	Notes	Format
Circa 1981	"First True Love Affair"	Jimmy Ross cover, Live at Misfits in Chicago	Cover/Live
Circa 1981	"Make Up Your Mind"	Live at Misfits in Chicago	Live
Circa 1981	"Jodie Foster"	Live at Misfits in Chicago	Live
Circa 1981	"Orangotango"	Live at Misfits in Chicago	Live
Circa 1982	"The Urge to Run Away"	Live at Misfits in Chicago	Live
Circa 1983	"So So Life"	Performed on the 1983 tour.	Live
Circa 1984	"Do You Even Like It?"	Performed on the 1984 tour.	Live
Circa 1986	"The Eyes of Christ"	Live at Medusa's in IL, re-worked into "Apathy" by 1000 Homo DJs	Live
Circa 1986	"Thrill Kill Kult"	Live at Medusa's in IL, re-worked into "Hatred" by Lead Into Gold	Live
Circa 1986	"The Angel (Remix)"	Re-Recorded Version, Performed on some 1986 and 1987 shows.	Remix
Circa 1987	"Ingrate"	Part of the original tracklist for The Land of Rape and Honey, but isn't on the final version.	Studio
Circa 1987	"I'm Sick"	Part of the original tracklist for The Land of Rape and Honey, but isn't on the final version.	Studio
Circa 1994	"Midnight Cowboy"	Fred Neil cover, performed live at Bridge Benefit VIII at the Shoreline Amphitheater.	Cover/Live

== Boxed sets ==
- Box (1993)
- Just Another Fix (1995)
- 3 for One Box (2000)
- Original Album Series (2011)
- Trax Box! (2015)

== Videos ==
=== Full length videos ===
- In Case You Didn't Feel Like Showing Up (1990)
- Tapes of Wrath (2000)
- Sphinctour (2002)
- Adios... Puta Madres (2009)

=== Music videos ===
Year	Song	Director(s)	Album
1982	"Same Old Madness"	Jim Nash	non-album single
1983	"Revenge"	Tim Pope	With Sympathy
1985	"Over the Shoulder"	Peter Christopherson (Note: In his 2013 autobiography, co-written with Jon Wiederhorn, Jourgensen claims Storm Thorgerson to be director of the video (Jourgensen & Wiederhorn 2013, p. 65).)	Twitch
1988	"Stigmata"	Benjamin Stokes and Eric Zimmerman	The Land of Rape and Honey
1988	"Flashback"	Benjamin Stokes	The Land of Rape and Honey
1989	"Burning Inside"	Benjamin Stokes and Eric Zimmerman	The Mind Is a Terrible Thing to Taste
1990	"The Land of Rape and Honey"	H-Gun Labs and Dead Battery Productions	In Case You Didn't Feel Like Showing Up
1991	"Jesus Built My Hotrod" (with Gibby Haynes)	Paul Elledge	Psalm 69
1992	"N.W.O."	Peter Christopherson	Psalm 69
1993	"Just One Fix"	Peter Christopherson	Psalm 69
1995	"Lay Lady Lay"	Paul Elledge	Filth Pig
1996	"Reload"	Doug Freel	Filth Pig
1999	"Bad Blood"	Benjamin Stokes	Dark Side of the Spoon
2001	"What About Us?"	Jeffrey Kinart	Greatest Fits
2004	"No W"		Houses of the Mole
2006	"LiesLiesLies"	Zach Passero	Rio Grande Blood
2012	"99%"	Zach Passero	Relapse
2012	"Ghouldiggers"		Relapse
2013	"Last Sucker"		The Last Sucker
2013	"PermaWar"	Zach Passero	From Beer to Eternity
2017	"Antifa"		AmeriKKKant
2018	"Wargasm" (Lyric Video)		AmeriKKKant
2018	"Twilight Zone"	Chris Roth	AmeriKKKant
2018	"Victims of a Clown"	Chris Roth	AmeriKKKant
2021	"Search & Destroy"	Dean Karr	Moral Hygiene
2021	"Disinformation"	Chris Roth	Moral Hygiene
2022	"Sabotage Is Sex" (with Jello Biafra)	Joel Smith	Moral Hygiene
2022	"Believe Me"	Ministry	Moral Hygiene
2023	"Goddamn White Trash"	Dean Karr	Hopiumforthemasses
2024	"New Religion"		Hopiumforthemasses
2024	"B.D.E."		Hopiumforthemasses
2025	"Every Day Is Halloween"	Vicente Cordero	The Squirrely Years Revisited
2025	"I'll Do Anything for You"	Vicente Cordero	The Squirrely Years Revisited
2026	"Burned Out"		Hate to Go (Take Out or Delivery)
2026	"We Hate"		Hate to Go (Take Out or Delivery)
2026	"Singularity"		Hate to Go (Take Out or Delivery)
2026	"Crickets"	Dean Karr	Hate to Go (Take Out or Delivery)

== Other appearances ==
Song(s)	Title	Year
"Stigmata"	Miami Vice	1988
"Stigmata"	Hardware	1990
"Thieves"	Freejack	1992
"N.W.O."	Cool World	1992
"Just One Fix"	Totally Fucked Up	1993
"Psalm 69"	The River Wild	1994
"Jesus Built My Hotrod"	Exit to Eden	1994
"Tonight We Murder"	Demon Knight	1995
"Stigmata"	Rumble in the Bronx	1995
"N.W.O."	SubUrbia	1996
"Paisley"	Escape from L.A.	1996
"Reload"	Speed 2: Cruise Control	1997
"(Every Day Is) Halloween"	The Black Bible	1998
"Just One Fix"	Urban Legend	1998
"Bad Blood"	The Matrix: Music from the Motion Picture	1999
"Eureka Pile"	Universal Soldier: The Return	1999
"Nursing Home"	Left Behind: The Movie	2000
"10/10"	Street Sk8r 2	2000
"What About Us" and "Dead Practice"	A.I. Artificial Intelligence	2001
"Jesus Built My Hotrod"	Crusty Demons/Watch Dogs	2003/2014
"No W"	Tony Hawk's Underground 2	2004
"No W"	Need for Speed: Underground 2	2004
"Bloodlines"	Vampire: The Masquerade – Bloodlines	2004
"Thieves" and "Waiting"	Murderball	2005
"The Light Pours Out of Me"	Alone in the Dark	2005
"Señor Peligro" and "Burning Inside"	Scarface: The World Is Yours	2006
"Stigmata"	Tony Hawk's Project 8	2006
"Fear (Is Big Business)"	Saw III	2006
"Hero"	Tom Clancy's Ghost Recon Advanced Warfighter 2	2007
"Life Is Good"	Saw IV	2007
"Death and Destruction (Remix)"	Saw V	2008
"Bang a Gong", "Radar Love", "Cuz U R Next" and "Khyber Pass (Wicked Instrumental)"	The Wicked Soundtrack by Al Jourgensen	2008
"NCIS Theme (Remix)"	NCIS: The Official TV Soundtrack	2009
"Stigmata" and "Thieves"	Brütal Legend	2009
"Fear (Is Big Business)", "Palestina" and "Khyber Pass"	The Hurt Locker	2009
"Just One Fix"	Hatchet II	2010
"N.W.O."	Need for Speed: The Run	2011

== Tribute albums ==
- An Industrial Tribute to Ministry
- Wish You Were Queer: A Tribute to Ministry
- Another Prick In the Wall: A Tribute to Ministry - Volume 2
- Devilswork: Tribute to Ministry
