= Tapes of Wrath =

Video by Ministry and Revolting Cocks
- Released: August 8, 2000
- Genre: Industrial metal; industrial rock
- Length: 66:15
- Label: Warner Reprise Video
- Producer: Hypo Luxa; Hermes Pan

Ministry chronology
Dark Side of the Spoon (1999)	Tapes of Wrath (2000)	Greatest Fits (2001)

Professional ratings
Review scores
Source	Rating
AllMusic	4/5 stars
Rock Hard	positive

Tapes of Wrath is a compilation of promotional videos by American industrial metal band Ministry and their side project Revolting Cocks. Available both in VHS and DVD format, as well as in its entirety on the Internet Archive.

The title is a play on The Grapes of Wrath, a 1939 novel by John Steinbeck, and was also the original title for Ministry's 1992 album Psalm 69: The Way to Succeed and the Way to Suck Eggs.

== Track listing ==
No.	Title	Director(s)	Length
1.	"Over the Shoulder"	Peter Christopherson	6:48
2.	"Stigmata"	Benjamin Stokes and Eric Zimmerman	7:00
3.	"Flashback"	Benjamin Stokes	4:52
4.	"Burning Inside"	Benjamin Stokes and Eric Zimmerman	5:12
5.	"The Land of Rape and Honey"	H-Gun Labs and Dead Battery Productions	5:32
6.	"Jesus Built My Hotrod" (feat. Gibby Haynes)	Paul Elledge	5:02
7.	"N.W.O."	Peter Christopherson	5:27
8.	"Just One Fix"	Peter Christopherson	4:21
9.	"Lay Lady Lay" (Bob Dylan cover)	Paul Elledge	5:09
10.	"Reload"	Doug Freel	3:03
11.	"Bad Blood"	Benjamin Stokes	4:04
12.	"Crackin' Up"		4:42
13.	"Da Ya Think I'm Sexy?" (Rod Stewart cover)		5:03

Videos 1 to 11 are from Ministry; the last two are from the Revolting Cocks.
