= Greatest Fits =

Greatest hits album by Ministry
- Released: June 19, 2001
- Recorded: 1987–2001
- Genre: Industrial metal; industrial rock
- Length: 75:12
- Label: Warner Bros.
- Producer: Hypo Luxa; Hermes Pan

Ministry chronology
Dark Side of the Spoon (1999)	Greatest Fits (2001)	Sphinctour (2002)

Singles from Greatest Fits
- 1. "What About Us?" Released: June 2001

Professional ratings
Review scores
Source	Rating
Allmusic	4.5/5 stars
NME	(7/10)
Q	4/5 stars
The Rolling Stone Album Guide	3/5 stars

Greatest Fits is a greatest hits album by American industrial metal band Ministry, released on June 19, 2001, by Warner Bros. Records.

== Background ==
The compilation was released to coincide with the release of the movie A.I. Artificial Intelligence, which features a scene of the band performing "What About Us?" Paul Barker had intended for "Over the Shoulder" and "Burning Inside" to appear on the compilation, but they were left off due to time limitations.

== Track listing ==
No.	Title	Writer(s)	From	Length
1.	"What About Us?"	Al Jourgensen; Paul Barker; Max Brody; Ty Coon	Previously unreleased*	5:52
2.	"Stigmata" (Update Mix)	Jourgensen	The Land of Rape and Honey	5:44
3.	"The Land of Rape and Honey"	Jourgensen; Barker	The Land of Rape and Honey	5:11
4.	"Thieves"	Jourgensen; Barker; Kevin Ogilvie; Chris Connelly	The Mind Is a Terrible Thing to Taste	5:01
5.	"So What" (live)	Jourgensen; Barker; Bill Rieflin; Connelly	1995 Big Day Out festival	10:33
6.	"N.W.O."	Jourgensen; Barker	Psalm 69	5:30
7.	"Just One Fix"	Jourgensen; Barker; Rieflin; Michael Balch	Psalm 69	5:11
8.	"Jesus Built My Hotrod" (featuring Gibby Haynes)	Jourgensen; Barker; Rieflin; Balch; Gibby Haynes	Psalm 69	4:51
9.	"Reload" (12" version)	Jourgensen; Barker	Reload single*	3:37
10.	"Lay Lady Lay" (Bob Dylan cover)	Bob Dylan	Filth Pig	5:44
11.	"Supermanic Soul"	Jourgensen; Barker; Louis Svitek; Zlatko Hukic; Rey Washam	Dark Side of the Spoon	3:13
12.	"Bad Blood" (Alternative Mix)	Jourgensen; Barker; Washam; Coon	Dark Side of the Spoon	5:00
13.	"Supernaut" (Black Sabbath cover)	Geezer Butler; Tony Iommi; Ozzy Osbourne; Bill Ward	1000 Homo DJs single	7:09
Total length:				75:12

- "What About Us?" was originally briefly featured in a scene from the film A.I. Artificial Intelligence. "So What" originally appeared on the album The Mind Is a Terrible Thing to Taste. "Reload" originally appeared on the album Filth Pig, with the 12" version from the Reload single. The cover of Black Sabbath's "Supernaut" was later featured on the album Cover Up.

== Personnel ==
Credits adapted from the liner notes of Greatest Fits.

- Al Jourgensen – guitars (1, 2, 4, 6, 7, 9–13), vocals (1–7, 9–13), slide guitar (1, 8, 10, 12), programming (1–4, 6, 8–10, 12, 13), lead guitars (8), mandolin (9), organ (10), production, engineer (2, 3)
- Paul Barker – bass (1, 2, 4–13), programming (1–4, 6–13), production, engineer (2, 3)
- Max Brody – drums (1), programming (1)
- Ty Coon – vocals (1, 12)
- Bryan Rickerson – engineer (1)
- Dylan Ely – engineer (1, 13)
- Tom Arnold – engineer (1)
- William Rieflin – drums (2, 6–9), backing vocals (2)
- Keith Auerbach – engineer (3)
- David Ogilvie – engineer (4)
- Jeff Newell – engineer (4, 6–8)
- Mike Scaccia – guitar (5, 7–10), lead guitar (13)
- Louis Svitek – guitar (5, 10)
- Rey Washam – drums (5, 10–12)
- Duane Buford – keyboards (5)
- Paul Manno – engineer (6, 7, 10)
- Michael Balch – programming (7, 8)
- Gibby Haynes – vocals (8)
- Zlatko Hukic – engineer (9)
- Brad Kopplin – engineer (10)
- Jason Bacher – engineer (11, 12)
- Jeff Dehaven – engineer (11, 12)
- Bryan Kenny – engineer (11–13)
- Jeff Ward – drums (13)
- Tom Baker – mastering
- Paul Elledge – art direction, photography
- Brian Shanley – photography
- Robert Hakalski – photography
