= Ministry Trax! Box =

Trax! Box

Box set by Ministry
- Released: April 18, 2015
- Recorded: 1980–1990
- Genre: Synthpop, new wave, EBM, industrial
- Length: 9:32:44
- Label: Cleopatra
- Producer: Various

Professional ratings
Review scores
Source	Rating
PopMatters	9/10 stars

Trax! Box is a 2015 compilation box set by American rock band Ministry. It collects the band’s 1980-1985 output on the Wax Trax! label, including all remixes, side projects and period rarities. This collection builds greatly upon the 2004 RykoDisc re-issues and adds dozens of previously unreleased tracks.

The box set consists of 7 CDs, 1 live LP and a 64-page book. It was initially released for Record Store Day 2015 in edition of 2,000 copies, followed by a standard digital release.

== Track listing ==
CD 1 – The Original Recordings
	Title	Run time	Original release
1.	I'm Falling	4:25	Early Trax (2004)
2.	Cold Life	5:09	I'm Falling single (1981)
3.	Primental	5:15	I'm Falling single (1981)
4.	All Day	5:51	All Day single (1985)
5.	Every Day Is Halloween	6:36	All Day single (1985)
6.	The Nature Of Love	7:02	The Nature Of Love single (1985)
7.	Overkill	4:32	Early Trax (2004)
8.	Same Old Madness	5:07	[Previously unreleased]
9.	I'll Do Anything For You	5:33	[Previously unreleased]
10.	He's Angry	3:54	Early Trax (2004)
11.	Move (Original Mix)	5:06	Early Trax (2004)
12.	I See Red	5:55	[Previously unreleased]
13.	Where Are You At Now?	6:18	[Previously unreleased]
14.	Nature of Outtakes	8:08	Halloween Remix single (1985)
Total run time:		1:18:51	

Notes:

- "I'm Falling" is the unreleased version that originally appeared on "Early Trax". This track, along with "Overkill" were test pressed by Wax Trax! in 1981 for a 7" entitled "Ministry of Fear" but remained unreleased until 2004.
- "Cold Life" is the short version that originally appeared on "Twelve Inch Singles (1981–1984)"
- "Same Old Madness" is an earlier, entirely different version that has not yet appeared elsewhere.
- "Where Are You At Now?" is an early mix of the "Nature of Love (Cruelty Mix)"

CD 2 – Remixes & Demos
	Title	Run time	Original release
1.	Halloween Remix	10:25	Halloween Remix single (1985)
2.	Nature Of Love (Cruelty Mix)	6:44	The Nature Of Love single (1985)
3.	All Day Remix	6:34	Twelve Inch Singles (1981–1984) (1987)
4.	Cold Life Dub	6:24	Cold Life single (1982)
5.	I'm Falling (Alt Mix)	4:04	I'm Falling single (1981)
6.	Work For Love (Demo)	3:51	[Previously unreleased]
7.	I Wanted To Tell Her (Demo)	6:07	[Previously unreleased]
8.	Same Old Madness (Demo)	5:59	[Previously unreleased]
9.	She's Got A Cause (Demo)	3:51	[Previously unreleased]
10.	Revenge (Piano Intro) [Demo]	4:39	[Previously unreleased]
11.	The Game Is Over (Demo)	5:11	[Previously unreleased]
12.	Let's Be Happy (Demo)	4:25	[Previously unreleased]
13.	Same Old Scene (Demo)	5:13	[Previously unreleased]
14.	Wait (Demo)	4:13	[Previously unreleased]
Total run time:		1:17:40	

Notes:

- "Nature of Love (Cruelty Mix)" is the extended version from "Twelve Inch Singles 1981-1984"
- "All Day Remix" is the extended version from "Twelve Inch Singles 1981-1984"
- "I'm Falling (Alt Mix)" is incorrectly listed as previously unreleased. It is the same version that appears on the debut "I'm Falling/Cold Life" single.
- "Work For Love (Demo)" is identical to "Work For Love (Short Version)" that only appeared on the American and Italian pressings of the "Work For Love" 12" single.
- "Same Old Madness (Demo)" is the same version that appears on the Twelve Inch Singles 1981-1984 re-issue.

CD 3 – Revolting Cocks: Big Sexy Land
	Title	Run time	Original release
1.	38	4:10	Big Sexy Land (1986)
2.	We Shall Cleanse the World	5:35	Big Sexy Land (1986)
3.	Attack Ships on Fire	4:54	Big Sexy Land (1986)
4.	Big Sexy Land	3:58	Big Sexy Land (1986)
5.	Union Carbide (West Virginia)	3:17	Big Sexy Land (1986)
6.	T.V. Mind	5:42	Big Sexy Land (1986)
7.	No Devotion	6:53	Big Sexy Land (1986)
8.	Union Carbide (Bhopal)	3:38	Big Sexy Land (1986)
9.	You Often Forget (Malignant)	8:29	You Often Forget single (1986)
10.	You Often Forget (Benign)	4:30	You Often Forget single (1986)
11.	Attack Ships...	4:44	No Devotion single (1986)
12.	...On Fire	6:52	No Devotion single (1986)
13.	No Devotion	10:33	No Devotion single (1986)
14.	T.V. Mind Remix	4:26	Stainless Steel Providers CD single (1989)
Total run time:		1:17:28	

CD 4 – Revolting Cocks - Live! You Goddamned Son Of A Bitch
	Title	Run time	Original release
1.	You Goddamned Son of a Bitch	4:51	Live! You Goddamned Son Of A Bitch (1988)
2.	Cattle Grind	5:53	Live! You Goddamned Son Of A Bitch (1988)
3.	We Shall Cleanse the World	7:10	Live! You Goddamned Son Of A Bitch (1988)
4.	38	4:20	Live! You Goddamned Son Of A Bitch (1988)
5.	In the Neck	5:09	Live! You Goddamned Son Of A Bitch (1988)
6.	You Often Forget	8:25	Live! You Goddamned Son Of A Bitch (1988)
7.	T.V. Mind	7:44	Live! You Goddamned Son Of A Bitch (1988)
8.	Union Carbide	8:28	Live! You Goddamned Son Of A Bitch (1988)
9.	Attack Ships on Fire	7:30	Live! You Goddamned Son Of A Bitch (1988)
10.	No Devotion	11:54	Live! You Goddamned Son Of A Bitch (1988)
11.	Stainless Steel Providers	6:50	Beers, Steers + Queers (The Remixes) (1991)
Total run time:		1:18:14	

Notes:

- Some crowd noises between tracks have been edited.
- "Stainless Steel Providers" comes from the same Ministry show that was released as "In Case You Didn't Feel Like Showing Up" and "Live Necronomicon" (February 22, 1990 at the Holiday Star Theatre, Merrillville, Indiana)

CD 5 – Revolting Cocks - Beers, Steers + Queers
	Title	Run time	Original release
1.	Beers, Steers + Queers	5:56	Beers, Steers + Queers (1990)
2.	(Let's Get) Physical	4:16	Beers, Steers + Queers (1990)
3.	In The Neck	5:32	Beers, Steers + Queers (1990)
4.	Get Down	6:54	Beers, Steers + Queers (1990)
5.	Stainless Steel Providers	5:49	Beers, Steers + Queers (1990)
6.	Can't Sit Still	5:31	Beers, Steers + Queers (1990)
7.	Something Wonderful	4:32	Beers, Steers + Queers (1990)
8.	Razor's Edge	4:43	Beers, Steers + Queers (1990)
9.	Cattle Grind (Studio Mix)	4:41	Beers, Steers + Queers (The Compact Disc) (2004)
10.	At The Top	6:24	Stainless Steel Providers single (1989)
11.	Beers, Steers + Queers (Drop Yer Britches Mix)	5:45	Beers, Steers + Queers (The Remixes) (1991)
12.	Beers, Steers + Queers (Take Em Right Off Mix)	4:20	Beers, Steers + Queers (The Remixes) (1991)
13.	(Let's Talk) Physical	6:53	[Previously unreleased]
14.	Public Image (live)	4:04	Beers, Steers + Queers (The Remixes) (1991)
Total run time:		1:15:20	

Notes:

- "Get Down" is the short version that appeared on the LP and Cassette editions.
- "Public Image" comes from the same Ministry show that was released as "In Case You Didn't Feel Like Showing Up" and "Live Necronomicon" (February 22, 1990 at the Holiday Star Theatre, Merrillville, Indiana)
- "(Let's Talk) Physical" is different from the track of the same title on the B-Side of the "(Let's Get) Physical" (1989) single.

CD 6 – Pailhead, 1000 Homo DJs, PTP & Acid Horse
	Artist	Title	Run time	Original release
1.	Pailhead	I Will Refuse	4:17	I Will Refuse single (1987)
2.	Pailhead	No Bunny	4:59	I Will Refuse single (1987)
3.	Pailhead	Don't Stand In Line	3:47	Don't Stand In Line single (1988)
4.	Pailhead	Ballad	3:51	Don't Stand In Line single (1988)
5.	Pailhead	Man Should Surrender	3:42	Man Should Surrender single (1988)
6.	Pailhead	Anthem	4:45	Man Should Surrender single (1988)
7.	1000 Homo DJs	Apathy	4:36	Apathy single (1988)
8.	1000 Homo DJs	Better Ways	5:24	Apathy single (1988)
9.	1000 Homo DJs	Supernaut	6:38	Supernaut single (1990)
10.	1000 Homo DJs	Hey Asshole	8:08	Supernaut single (1990)
11.	PTP	Rubber Glove Seduction	5:23	Rubber Glove Seduction single (1989)
12.	PTP	My Favorite Things	4:29	Rubber Glove Seduction single (1989)
13.	PTP	Show Me Your Spine	4:57	Side Trax (2004)
14.	Acid Horse	No Name, No Slogan (Luxa/Pan Mix)	5:55	No Name, No Slogan single (1989)
15.	Acid Horse	No Name, No Slogan (Cabaret Voltaire Mix)	9:04	No Name, No Slogan single (1989)
Total run time:			1:19:55	

Notes:

- This is the first time these tracks have been made available digitally in their correct stereo format.
- "Show Me Your Spine" was originally featured in the 1987 film RoboCop, but did not receive a commercial release until being featured on Side Trax.

CD 7 – Rarities
	Artist	Title	Run time	Original release
1.	Ministry	Same Old Madness (Video Version)	3:40	[Previously unreleased]
2.	Ministry	Never Asked For Nothing (Live Detroit 7.10.82)	7:01	[Previously unreleased]
3.	Ministry	Love Change (Live Detroit 7.10.82)	4:02	[Previously unreleased]
4.	Ministry	What Is The Reason (Live Detroit 7.10.82)	4:09	[Previously unreleased]
5.	Ministry	America (Live Detroit 7.10.82)	5:43	[Previously unreleased]
6.	Revolting Cocks	(Let's Get) Physical (Banned Original Mix)	5:01	[Previously unreleased]
7.	Revolting Cocks	We Shall Cleanse The World (Razormaid Mix)	5:14	Razormaid Chapter !-10 (1986)
8.	Revolting Cocks	Fish In Cold Water	5:59	[Previously unreleased]
9.	Ministry	Self Annoyed	5:31	[Previously unreleased]
10.	Pailhead	Don't Stand In Line (Remix)	5:01	Sounds Blasts! EP2 (1989)
11.	1000 Homo DJs	Supernaut (Trent Vocals)	6:36	Blackbox - Wax Trax! Records: The First 13 Years. (1994)
12.	1000 Homo DJs	Supernaut (Dub Mix)	6:56	[Previously unreleased]
13.	Revolting Cocks	Get Down (Extended Mix)	13:39	Beers, Steers + Queers (The Compact Disc) (2004)
Total run time:			1:18:32	

Notes:

- "We Shall Cleanse The World (Razormaid Mix)" is edited from its original release.
- "Self Annoyed" is an early version of "Destruction" from The Land of Rape and Honey.

Chicago 1982
	Title	Run time
1.	Same Old Madness	5:41
2.	Revenge	6:13
3.	Effigy	5:00
4.	Primental	4:33
5.	I'm Falling	3:44
6.	Overkill	5:03
Total run time:		30:14

Notes:

- This live album was previously unreleased. It remained exclusive to this box set until it was released as part of the expanded Chicago/Detroit 1982 in 2019. Since the latter was released only on CD, however, the vinyl record contained in this set remains exclusive to it.
