= Sphinctour =

Live album by Ministry
- Released: March 19, 2002 (CD); April 9, 2002 (DVD/VHS)
- Recorded: April–July 1996
- Genre: Industrial metal
- Length: 80:15
- Label: Sanctuary
- Producers: Hypo Luxa, Hermes Pan

Ministry chronology
Greatest Fits (2001)	Sphinctour (2002)	Animositisomina (2003)

Professional ratings
Review scores
Source	Rating
AllMusic	3/5 stars
The Rolling Stone Album Guide	1.5/5 stars

Sphinctour is a live CD/DVD/VHS release by the industrial metal band Ministry released in 2002. It contains various tracks recorded on their 1996 world tour in support of the album Filth Pig. The album title is a play on the word sphincter.

== Track listing ==
No.	Title	Length
1.	"Psalm 69" (Elysée Montmartre, Paris)	5:04
2.	"Crumbs" (Congress Center, Stuttgart)	3:54
3.	"Reload" (Convention Center, Albuquerque)	2:33
4.	"Filth Pig" (Varsity Arena, Toronto)	6:30
5.	"So What" (The Warfield, San Francisco)	9:45
6.	"Just One Fix" (Aragon Ballroom, Chicago)	4:38
7.	"N.W.O." (Hollywood Palladium, Los Angeles)	6:04
8.	"Hero" (Gaswerk, Hamburg)	2:38
9.	"Thieves" (Mercer Arena, Seattle)	5:14
10.	"Scarecrow" (Jesolo Beach Festival, Venice)	7:56
11.	"Lava" (Dour Festival, Brussels)	8:43
12.	"The Fall" (Brixton Academy, London)	8:02
13.	"Stigmata" (Roseland Ballroom, New York)	9:14

- Track 5 and 13 not included on CD releases

== Album release ==
The original objective of Sphinctour was as a home video release, though a CD version was also made. There are no discernible differences audio-wise from the DVD, although, like their In Case You Didn't Feel Like Showing Up release, two tracks were omitted from the CD release. In addition, the DVD features the song "Happy Dust" as the intro and outro. The live video is edited as jump cut, which is a combination of all the concerts that took place in America and Europe.

== Personnel ==
=== Ministry ===
- Al Jourgensen - lead vocals, mandolin ("Reload"), harmonica ("Filth Pig"), rhythm guitar ("Just One Fix", "N.W.O.")
- Paul Barker - bass, backing vocals, keyboard bass ("The Fall")
- Zlatko Hukic - lead guitar, backing vocals
- Louis Svitek - rhythm guitar
- Duane Buford - keyboards
- Rey Washam - drums

=== Additional personnel ===
- Al Jourgensen - production
- Paul Barker - production
- Tom Baker - mastering
- Paul Elledge - image and design

=== Video personnel ===
- Jeffrey Kinart - television director, production, editor
- Doug Freel - director, editor
- Tom Tuntlend - assistant editor
- Todd Darling - post-production supervisor
