= Toronto 1986 =

Live album by Ministry
- Released: May 22, 2015
- Recorded: April 10, 1986, at the RPM Club (Toronto, Ontario)
- Length: 54:48
- Label: Cleopatra Records

Ministry chronology
Last Tangle in Paris / Live 2012 Defibrila Tour (2014)	Toronto 1986 (2015)

Toronto 1986 is a live CD/vinyl release by American rock band Ministry that was recorded live at the RPM club in Toronto, Ontario, on April 10, 1986, during the tour in support of the band's second studio album, Twitch. Parts of this performance were broadcast on FM radio, resulting in some tracks showing up on various bootlegs throughout the years. The complete master recording was located by archivists and it saw official release in 2015 via the band's official Bandcamp website. It was the first Ministry album chronologically to feature bassist Paul Barker and drummer Bill Rieflin, both of whom would become heavily involved in the band in subsequent years.

== Track listing ==
All tracks written by Al Jourgensen.

No.	Title	Length
1.	"Over the Shoulder"	7:08
2.	"My Possession"	5:18
3.	"We Believe"	6:16
4.	"No Devotion" (Revolting Cocks Cover)	9:41
5.	"Isle of Man"	5:30
6.	"Where You At Now"	2:50
7.	"All Day"	5:27
8.	"Everyday Is Halloween"	7:02
9.	"Just Like You"	5:36

== Personnel ==
- Al Jourgensen – vocals, keyboards
- Paul Barker – bass
- Bill Rieflin – drums
- Roland Barker – keyboards, saxophone
