= Mahsa Zargaran =

Persian sculptor

Omniflux
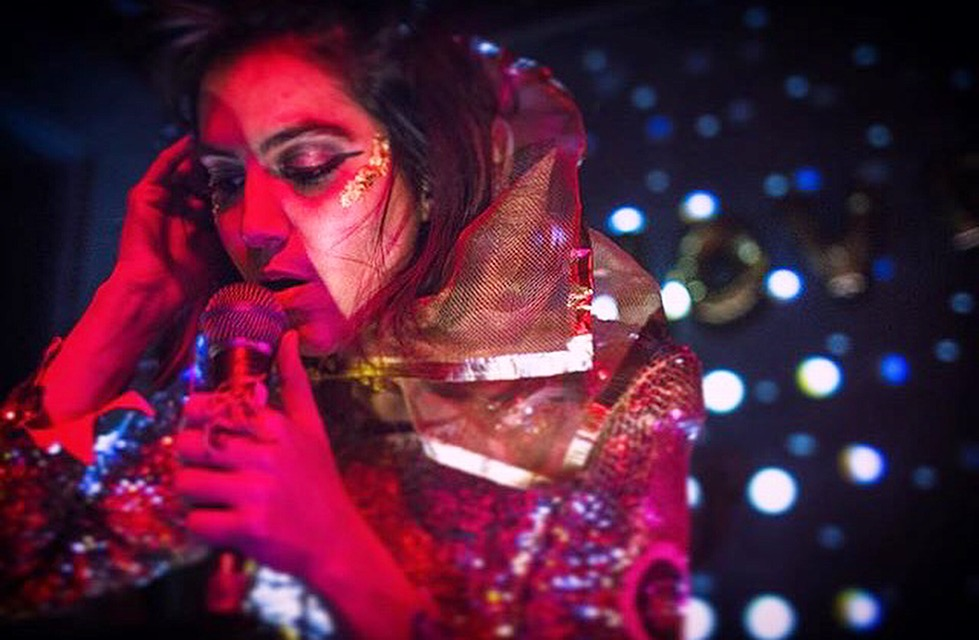
- Omniflux performing in Los Angeles in 2015

Background information
- Birth name: Mahsa Zargaran
- Born: 25 February 1984 (age 41); Tehran, Iran
- Genres: electronic, trip hop, experimental, industrial, art pop
- Occupation(s): Sculptor, music producer, composer, programmer, multi-instrumentalist, vocalist
- Instrument(s): Stone, steel, clay. Synthesizer, piano, drums, vocals, guitar, bass
- Years active: 2012–present
- Formerly of: Puscifer, Big Black Delta
- Partner: Paul Barker (2016–present)
- Website: studioomniflux.com

Mahsa Zargaran (Persian: مهسا زرگران; born 25 February 1984), known professionally as Omniflux, is a Persian sculptor, music producer, installation and performing artist. She released her debut album Aquarelle in 2018.

Zargaran's song "She & Him" was featured in the Netflix series Hemlock Grove.

Between 2015-2017 she toured with the American rock outfit Puscifer, as a programmer, keyboardist, guitarist, and vocalist.

Between 2010-2012 she toured with Big Black Delta as a drummer, and opened for M83 and Jane's Addiction.

In 2016 Zargaran sang with Gary Oldman in a tribute concert for David Bowie.

Zargaran is currently creating a life-size sculpture series and an electronic music installation on what she calls Modern Female Mythology.

== Albums ==
=== Aquarelle ===
Zargaran released her debut album Aquarelle in 2018, followed by a North American tour with OhGr, and Paul Barker's Lead into Gold.

LA Weekly called Zargaran's Aquarelle an "Anarchic Debut [that] Divorces our Stepford Lives"

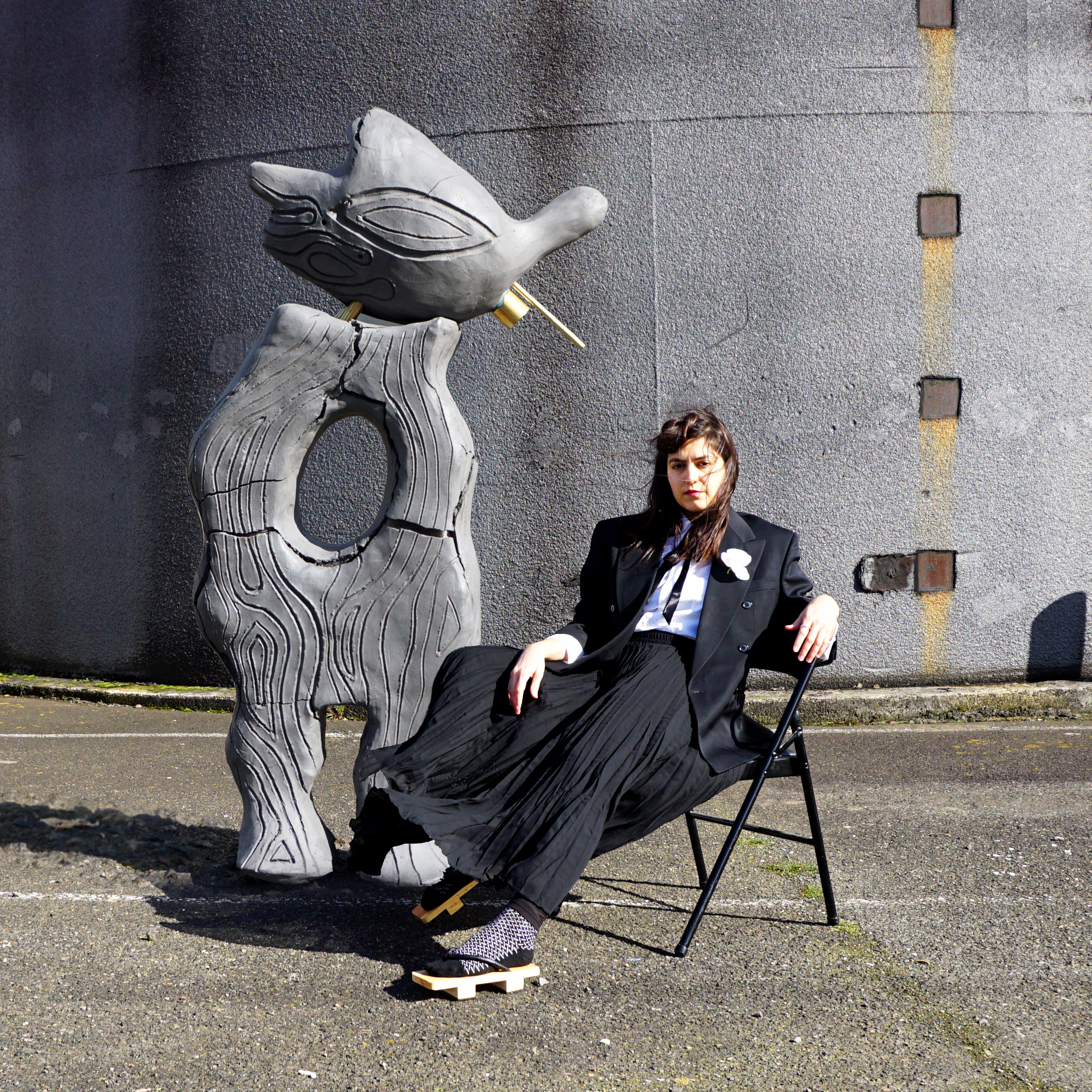
Sculpture created by Mahsa Zargaran for the album cover of Aquarelle.

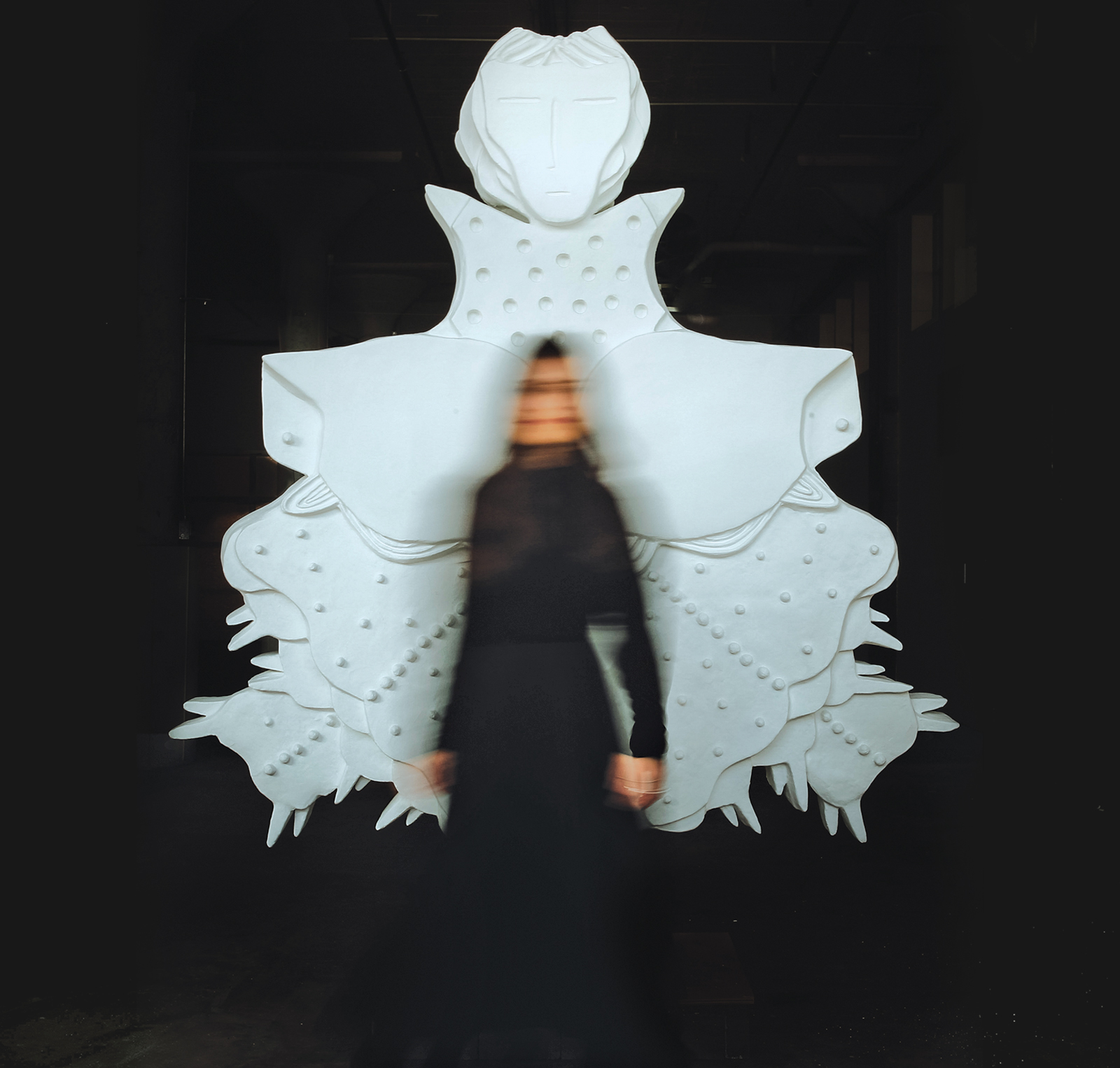
Mahsa Zargaran with one of her sculptures

Zargaran's song Body by Bernays from Aquarelle was inspired by Edward Bernays' invention of the PR industry and its rippling effects on our modern society, as portrayed in the documentary The Century of the Self

Zargaran's song Iris Van Herpen from Aquarelle is a tribute to the pioneering technical artistry of the Dutch fashion designer Iris Van Herpen.

Zargaran's song Marx Marvelous from Aquarelle was named after the narrator of the Tom Robbins' novel Another Roadside Attraction.

In her song FOMA stylish COMA from Aquarelle, the lyrics "I see no cat or cradle" call to a passage in Kurt Vonnegut's Cat's Cradle: "No wonder kids grow up crazy. A cat's cradle is nothing but a bunch of X's between somebody's hands, and little kids look and look and look at all those X's . . ."And? "No damn cat, and no damn cradle."

== Sculpture ==
Zargaran is currently creating a life-size sculpture series and an electronic music installation on what she called Modern Female Mythology. In this series, she draws on the connection between women and the natural world and aims to reimagine the role of women in myth. Her largest sculptures stand over 8 feet tall and 6 feet wide.

== Art Direction ==
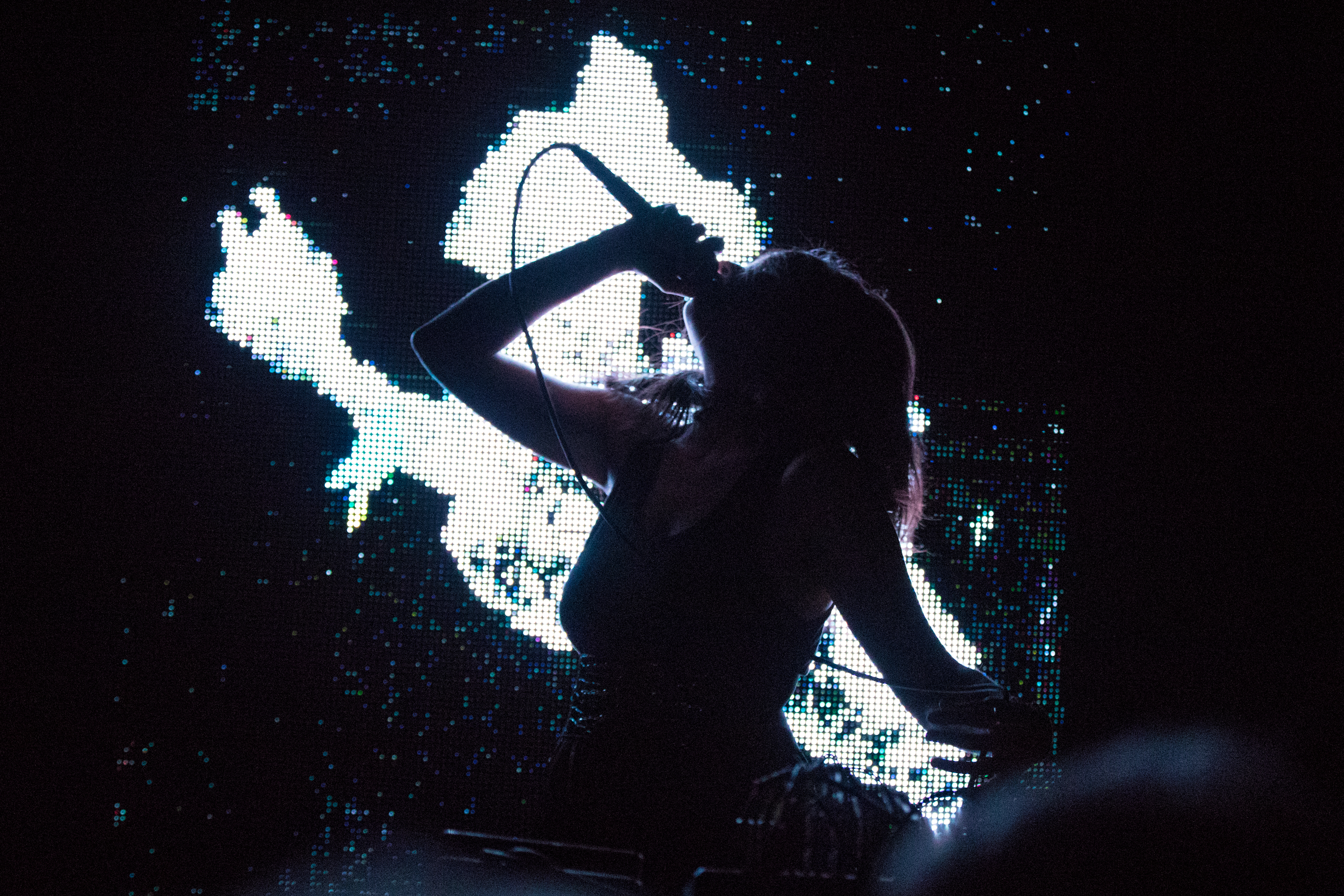
Omniflux performance in Los Angeles 2018

In 2022-2023 Zargaran created a series of multi-media works for the theater production Wendy, My Darling for their worldwide performances, including the Edinburgh Festival Fringe. For this production she produced a series of analogue pieces, including paintings, paper puppets, a sculptural head piece, and collages that she used to create the playbill poster and a collection of videos that were part of the live performance.

== Discography ==
Albums

- Aquarelle (2018)

Singles

- 2012: "Boy Caught in a Dress"
- 2012: "She and Him" as featured in the Netflix series Hemlock Grove
- 2015: "Dance in Your Blood"
- 2018" "Lawless Flawless"
- 2018 "Marx Marvelous"
- 2018 "Iris Van Herpen"

Music videos

- 2012: "Boy Caught in a Dress"
