= Early Trax =

Compilation album by Ministry
- Released: October 12, 2004
- Recorded: 1981–84
- Length: 73:19
- Label: Rykodisc
- Producer: Al Jourgensen

Ministry chronology
Houses of the Molé (2004)	Early Trax (2004)	Side Trax (2004)

Professional ratings
Review scores
Source	Rating
AllMusic	2.5/5 stars
The Austin Chronicle	2.5/5 stars
PopMatters	no score

Early Trax is a compilation album by American rock band Ministry, released on October 12, 2004, by Rykodisc.

The album contains either released or previously unreleased songs from 1981 through to 1984, as well as some remixes of those songs (roughly half of the album by time is made up of remixes of songs also on the album). The album is thus similar to the 1987 compilation album Twelve Inch Singles and contains much of the same material. Most of the songs on the album were initially released on the Wax Trax! label. As can be expected from Ministry's early work, the album features a strong synthpop and new wave flavor - Ministry moved more definitively into the industrial metal genre later into their career (post Twitch). The album also shows Ministry's early gothic rock beginnings, with the two mixes of "I'm Falling" and "Overkill" being some of their earliest tracks.

== Track listing ==
All tracks are written by Al Jourgensen.

No.	Title	Length
1.	"(Every Day Is) Halloween"	6:36
2.	"Halloween" (Remix)	10:23
3.	"All Day"	5:50
4.	"All Day" (Remix)	6:34
5.	"Nature of Love"	7:03
6.	"Nature of Love" (Cruelty Mix)	6:44
7.	"Nature of Love" (Outtakes)	8:08
8.	"He's Angry"	3:54
9.	"Move" (Original Mix)	5:06
10.	"I'm Falling"	4:24
11.	"I'm Falling" (Alternative Mix)	4:04
12.	"Overkill"	4:33

- Tracks 8, 9, 11, 12 were previously unreleased

== Personnel ==
- Al Jourgensen - vocals, guitar (10–12), keyboards, programming, production
- Stephen George - percussion (3, 4), drums (10–12)
- Brad Hallen - bass (3, 4)
- Patty Jourgensen - additional vocals (3–6)
- Richard 23 - additional vocals (5, 6)
- John Davis - keyboards (10–12)
- Marty Sorenson - bass (10–12)
- Paul Taylor - keyboards (10–11)
- Lawton Outlaw - art direction & design
