= Houses of the Molé =

Studio album by Ministry
- Released: June 21, 2004
- Recorded: 2003–2004
- Studio: Sonic Ranch (El Paso, Texas)
- Genre: Industrial metal; thrash metal
- Length: 55:00
- Label: Sanctuary
- Producer: Al Jourgensen

Ministry chronology
Animositisomina (2003)	Houses of the Molé (2004)	Early Trax (2004)

Singles from Houses of the Molé
- 1. "No W" Released: 2004

Houses of the Molé is the ninth studio album by American industrial metal band Ministry, released on June 21, 2004, by Sanctuary Records. It is noteworthy for being the first Ministry album not to feature bassist and longtime collaborator Paul Barker since Twitch (1986). It was also the first album to feature Mike Scaccia on guitar since 1996's Filth Pig.

== Overview ==
The album is the first part of the band's anti-Bush trilogy, followed by Rio Grande Blood (2006) and The Last Sucker (2007). It was released in the run up to the 2004 American presidential elections, in the last few months of Bush's first term as president. Nearly all songs start with the letter "W" in their title, except for "No W" and the hidden track "Psalm 23". The first track on the album, "No W", features numerous satirical samples of Bush's speeches, particularly samples in which he spoke of his war on terror. Compared to its subsequent follow-ups, the musical style of the album is more thrash metal-oriented.

Al Jourgensen describes Houses of the Molé as a "rebirth" album as he started Ministry anew without long time collaborator Paul Barker who left after the Animositisomina tour due to a falling-out. In his autobiography, Jourgensen describes that he wrote "Walrus" as a way to "celebrate" Barker's departure. In it, the words "Paul is no longer with us" play backwards on repeat.

Jourgensen has stated that the name Houses of the Molé is a tribute to Led Zeppelin's 1973 album Houses of the Holy. Mole itself is a Mexican sauce made from chocolate that is nearly black in color, an image that Jourgensen believes represents crude oil.

Former Ministry drummer Rey Washam stated in an interview that he worked on Houses of the Molé, for which he received no credit, and also stated that Ministry had problems properly compensating all of the musicians who contributed to their records. He also referred to "someone" in Ministry as being a "liar" and "full of shit", and disputed the statement and common belief that Al Jourgensen was solely responsible for writing almost all of Ministry's material. He also said "Houses of the Molé" was "the worst [album] title in the world".

This was the first Ministry studio album to not chart on the Billboard 200. Due to slow sales, the band left Sanctuary.

== Reception ==
Professional ratings
Aggregate scores
Source	Rating
Metacritic	75/100
Review scores
Source	Rating
AllMusic	4/5 stars
The Austin Chronicle	3.5/5 stars
Billboard	favourable
Collector's Guide to Heavy Metal	8/10
Playlouder	4/5 stars
Q	2/5 stars
Rock Hard	10/10
Rolling Stone	2/5 stars
The Rolling Stone Album Guide	2/5 stars

Houses of the Molé received generally positive reviews upon release, holding a 75/100 on review aggregate Metacritic.

Johnny Loftus of AllMusic credited the album for "fully resurrect[ing]" Jourgenson's career. The Austin Chronicle gave the album a positive review, with reviewer Michael Chamy saying "Houses of the Molé is signed, sealed, and delivered so powerfully that one can overlook the fact that it's basically Psalm 69 or The Mind Is a Terrible Thing to Taste Part II. Playlouder called the album "intense and angry" and praised the use of soundbites.

Houses of the Molé also received some mixed reviews from critics. Q gave the album a mixed review, saying "It's [an album] whose tricks... we've heard done before." In its review, Rolling Stone said "the album is so densely noisy that you'll need lots of patience to figure out whether Jourgensen is going on about politics, Armageddon or a hangnail."

In 2005, Houses of the Molé was ranked No. 434 in Rock Hard magazine's book of The 500 Greatest Rock & Metal Albums of All Time.

== Track listing ==
No.	Title	Writer(s)	Length
1.	"No W"	Al Jourgensen	3:24
2.	"Waiting"	Jourgensen; Mike Scaccia; Max Brody	5:02
3.	"Worthless"	Jourgensen; Scaccia; Brody	4:09
4.	"Wrong"	Jourgensen; Scaccia; Brody; John Monte	4:54
5.	"Warp City"	Jourgensen; Scaccia; Brody; Monte	4:01
6.	"WTV"	Jourgensen; Scaccia; Brody	4:35
7.	"World"	Jourgensen	5:13
8.	"WKYJ"	Jourgensen; Scaccia; Brody	5:14
9.	"Worm"	Jourgensen; Scaccia; Brody	9:11
23.	"Psalm 23" (hidden track)	Jourgensen	4:41
69.	"Walrus" (hidden track)	Jourgensen	2:43
Total length:			55:00

Alternate printing track listing
No.	Title	Writer(s)	Length
1.	"No W Redux"	Jourgensen	2:55
2.	"Waiting"	Jourgensen; Scaccia; Brody	5:02
3.	"Worthless"	Jourgensen	4:09
4.	"Wrong"	Jourgensen; Scaccia; Brody; Monte	4:54
5.	"Warp City"	Jourgensen; Scaccia; Brody; Monte	4:01
6.	"WTV"	Jourgensen; Scaccia; Brody	4:25
7.	"World"	Jourgensen	5:13
8.	"WKYJ"	Jourgensen; Scaccia; Brody	5:14
9.	"Worm"	Jourgensen; Scaccia; Brody	9:11
13.	"Bloodlines" (hidden track)	Jourgensen	7:14
69.	"Walrus" (hidden track)	Jourgensen	2:43
Total length:			57:27

The original release of Houses of the Molé featured "Psalm 23", an alternate version of "No W". Later releases feature a Redux version of "No W" (with the "O Fortuna" samples removed), dropped "Psalm 23", and added another (hidden) track titled "Bloodlines". "Walrus" is hidden track on track 69, just like their song "Everybody" on their 1999 album Dark Side of the Spoon. Every other track on the CD editions of the album consists of five seconds of silence.

== Personnel ==
=== Ministry ===
- Al Jourgensen – vocals, guitars (1–4, 8, 9), bass (1, 7, 8), programming, slide guitar (5), harmonica (9), production
- Mike Scaccia – lead guitar (1–3, 8), guitars, bass (2, 6, 9), background vocals (5, 9)
- John Monte – bass (3–5), background vocals (5)
- Mark Baker – drums (3–5), percussion (3), background vocals (5)

=== Additional personnel ===
- Max Brody – programming (2, 6, 7, 9), drums (8), saxophone (9), background vocals (9)
- Angie Jourgensen – background vocals (5, 9)
- Odin Myers – background vocals (5)
- Carl Wayne – background vocals (5)
- Kol Marshall – B3 organ (8, 9)
- Turner Vanblarcum – DJ voice (8)
- Lawton Outlaw – original cover, inside tray art, art direction, design
- Paul Elledge – photography
- Rey Washam – drums (uncredited)

== Chart positions ==
Chart (2004)	Peak position
French Albums (SNEP)	162
UK Albums (OCC)	135
UK Independent Albums (Official Charts)	13
UK Rock & Metal Albums (Official Charts)	17

== Bibliography ==
- Jourgensen, Al & Wiederhorn, Jon (July 9, 2013). Ministry: The Lost Gospels According To Al Jourgensen (loan required). Boston, MA: Da Capo Press. ISBN 9780306822186. OCLC 811206550 – via the Internet Archive.
