= Animositisomina =

Studio album by Ministry
- Released: February 18, 2003
- Recorded: 2002
- Studios: Sonic Ranch, El Paso
- Genre: Industrial metal
- Length: 53:45
- Label: Sanctuary
- Producers: Hypo Luxa; Hermes Pan

Ministry chronology
Sphinctour (2002)	Animositisomina (2003)	Houses of the Molé (2004)

Singles from Animositisomina
- 1. "Piss" Released: 2003; 2. "Animosity" Released: 2003

Professional ratings
Aggregate scores
Source	Rating
Metacritic	67/100
Review scores
Source	Rating
AllMusic	3/5 stars
Alternative Press	4/5 stars
The Austin Chronicle	1.5/5 stars
Billboard	favorable
Blender	3/5 stars
Collector's Guide to Heavy Metal	7/10
Entertainment Weekly	B
Rolling Stone	3/5 stars
The Rolling Stone Album Guide	2/5 stars

Animositisomina is the eighth studio album by American industrial metal band Ministry, released on February 18, 2003, by Sanctuary Records.

== Background ==
The album's title is a palindrome made of the word "animosity" spelled without the final letter and both forward and backward. According to an interview on Fuse's Uranium, Jourgensen was bored at the time he was coming up with the album's title. It is Ministry's first album to feature lyrics printed within the album sleeve.

"The Light Pours Out of Me" was written and originally recorded by Magazine for their Real Life album in 1978 and it is the only song in the album to have more than one word in the title. Ministry performed the song several times in concerts in the late 1980s, but it was never released or recorded officially.

Animositisomina is the last Ministry album with Paul Barker, thus ending the band's "Hypo Luxa/Hermes Pan" production duo. It is also the last album to feature Ministry performing in their traditional industrial metal style before switching to a more thrash-oriented sound on their next album, Houses of the Molé.

On April 27, 2016, in an interview for The Quietus, Jourgensen called Animositisomina his least favourite Ministry album, declaring it was "not fun to make" as he had been in the process of quitting heroin cold turkey during the recording sessions. Additionally, his relationship with Barker had become antagonistic, which prompted the latter to quit the band after the Animositisomina tour. "Leper," the last song on the album, was left as an instrumental as Jourgensen had left the studio earlier than scheduled and was uninterested in writing lyrics. Jourgensen considers Animositisomina a "non-album" and left most of the recording responsibilities to Barker.

Though Jourgensen disliked Animositisomina, some fans enjoyed it for its fast and thrashy sound, after being dissatisfied with the slower-paced Dark Side of the Spoon and Filth Pig albums.

== Track listing ==
All tracks are written by Al Jourgensen and Paul Barker, except track 6. Co-writers noted below.

No.	Title	Writer(s)	Length
1.	"Animosity"	Max Brody; Adam Grossman	4:36
2.	"Unsung"	Louis Svitek; Rey Washam	3:11
3.	"Piss"	Svitek; Washam	5:10
4.	"Lockbox"	Brody; Svitek; Washam	4:45
5.	"Broken"	Brody	4:52
6.	"The Light Pours Out of Me" (Magazine cover)	Howard Devoto; Pete Shelley; John McGeoch	4:26
7.	"Shove"	Brody	5:53
8.	"Impossible"	Svitek; Washam; Kathryn Kinslow	7:43
9.	"Stolen"	Brody	4:09
10.	"Leper" (instrumental)	Brody	9:00

== Personnel ==
=== Ministry ===
- Al Jourgensen – vocals (1–8), guitars (1–8, 10), keyboards (1, 4–6, 8, 10), de-programming, production
- Paul Barker – bass, programming, keyboards (2, 5, 7, 9, 10), vocals (9), rhythm guitar (5, 7, 9), production

=== Additional personnel ===
- Max Brody – drums and percussion, programming (1, 4, 5, 7, 9, 10), sax (9)
- Adam Grossman – guitars (1)
- Rey Washam – drums and percussion (2–4, 8)
- Louis Svitek – guitars (2–4, 8)
- Angela Lukacin-Jourgensen – background vocals (4)
- Kathryn Kinslow – chorus vocals (8)
- Justin Leeah – engineer
- Joey Cazares – assistant engineer
- Bobby Torres – assistant engineer
- Paul Elledge – art & direction
- Leasha Elledge – art & direction
- Tim Bruce – design
- Tom Baker – mastering

== Chart positions ==
Chart (2003)	Peak position
French Albums (SNEP)	125
German Albums (Offizielle Top 100)	93
UK Albums (OCC)	186
US Billboard 200	157
