= The Land of Rape and Honey =

1988 studio album by Ministry

Studio album by Ministry
- Released: October 11, 1988
- Studios: Southern Studios, London; Chicago Trax Studios, Chicago, Illinois
- Genres: Industrial rock; industrial metal
- Length: 46:31
- Label: Sire
- Producers: Hypo Luxa; Hermes Pan; Eddie Echo

Ministry chronology
Twelve Inch Singles (1981–1984) (1987)	The Land of Rape and Honey (1988)	The Mind Is a Terrible Thing to Taste (1989)

Singles from The Land of Rape and Honey
- 1. "Stigmata" Released: August 1988

Professional ratings
Review scores
Source	Rating
AllMusic	4.5/5 stars
Encyclopedia of Popular Music	3/5 stars
Kerrang!	5/5 stars
MusicHound Rock	4.5/5 stars
The Rolling Stone Album Guide	3.5/5 stars
Spin Alternative Record Guide	8/10
The Village Voice	B+

The Land of Rape and Honey is the third studio album by American industrial metal band Ministry, released on October 11, 1988, by Sire Records. This is the first Ministry album to include bassist Paul Barker and marks a departure from the band's previous two synthpop and EBM records. It incorporates heavy metal guitars and industrial music influences, and Al Jourgensen uses distorted vocals in his natural accent, rather than the faux British accent of previous albums. The resulting sound was influential in the industrial metal genre and is Jourgensen's favorite Ministry album. The album was certified gold by the RIAA in January 1996.

The album title comes from the slogan of Tisdale, Saskatchewan, whose motto at that time was "The Land of Rape and Honey", a reference to the agricultural products rapeseed and honey. The band chose the name after seeing the slogan on a souvenir mug.

== Background ==
Jourgensen credited his work with Adrian Sherwood on the preceding album, Twitch, for giving him confidence in his vision and showing him new techniques, which he said he pushed to an extreme. Jourgensen had experimented with a heavier, industrial sound starting in the mid-1980s with singles such as "No Devotion" from the Revolting Cocks' Big Sexy Land and "All Day" from Twitch. When RevCo's next single was more commercial, Sire proposed doing the same for the new Ministry album, but Jourgensen threatened to disband Ministry. Continuing in this less-commercial, industrial-laced direction, Land of Rape and Honey incorporates elements of heavy metal such as fast electric guitar riffs, although only the album's first three songs use guitars extensively. "Stigmata" does not feature live guitars; the two chord riff, altered with a pitch shifter, was sampled. Jourgensen had written some of the songs prior to working on Twitch and said this was the sound he originally wanted for the band.

In his memoirs, Jourgensen described himself at the time as a "functional addict" who scheduled his life around his dealer's availability. Despite this, he spent hours editing tapes of music the band had recorded; Jourgensen described them as "snippets of noise" that came to him in dreams. Inspired by William Burroughs and the cut-up technique, Jourgensen cut up the tapes and spliced them back together randomly until he liked the end result. Jourgensen wrote "Stigmata" at the last minute after realizing he needed another song to complete the album.

A post made on Wax Trax! Records' official Instagram account in 2019 shows a handwritten production sheet featuring a number of tracks which did not appear on the final record. Certain songs were instead released through the bands' side projects: "Idiot" and "Blackened Heart" under Lead Into Gold and "Apathy" for 1000 Homo DJs.

== Artwork ==
The album cover is an electronically processed image of a burned corpse in the Leipzig-Thekla subcamp of Buchenwald. Jourgensen took a photograph while watching a Holocaust documentary on television and distorted the image himself. According to Jourgensen, it was originally rejected by the record label, but they later changed their mind after Jourgensen cut off the head of a roadkilled deer, put it in his truck, drove from Austin to Los Angeles, went into the Sire Records building, threw the head on the desk of the head of the art department and said, "Here's your new fucking [album] cover."

Additional inner sleeve photography features a 1945 archival film footage of corpses of the Mittelbau-Dora concentration camp lying in a hillside mass grave in Nordhausen, Germany.

== Legacy ==
The album was certified gold by the RIAA in January 1996 and was re-issued by Wounded Bird Records in 2007.

Tom Moon wrote in 1,000 Recordings to Hear Before You Die that the album "became the blueprint for all of what was tagged as 'industrial' dance music". Fear Factory, Linkin Park, Slipknot, System of a Down, and Nine Inch Nails have cited this album as a major influence. Jason Heller of The A.V. Club said the album "straddles a huge shift in industrial" and includes influences from most industrial music offshoots at the time. Heller suggested it to pop culture enthusiasts who want an accessible entry-point for industrial music. Jourgensen has cited The Land of Rape and Honey as his favorite Ministry album, likening it to a learning experience that changes one's life. However, Jourgensen said that "Stigmata" is his least favorite song in the Ministry catalogue for its simplistic songwriting despite its popularity. The track is featured in Richard Stanley's 1990 science fiction thriller Hardware, although the band shown performing the track is Gwar. Marilyn Manson performed a cover on the soundtrack of the film Atomic Blonde.

== Track listing ==
All tracks are written by Al Jourgensen except where noted

No.	Title	Writer(s)	Length
1.	"Stigmata"		5:45
2.	"The Missing"		2:55
3.	"Deity"		3:20
4.	"Golden Dawn"	Jourgensen, Barker	5:42
5.	"Destruction"	Jourgensen, Barker	3:30
6.	"Hizbollah" (CD bonus track)		3:58
7.	"The Land of Rape and Honey"	Jourgensen, Barker	5:10
8.	"You Know What You Are"	Jourgensen, Barker	4:43
9.	"I Prefer" (CD bonus track)		2:15
10.	"Flashback"		4:50
11.	"Abortive"	Adrian Sherwood	4:23

=== Samples ===
4. "Golden Dawn"
  - "You are being found guilty of covenants with the devil," "State your confession," "Confess! Confess!" "The Anti-Christ" - from the 1971 film The Devils
  - [chanting] - Aleister Crowley, from his "Call of the First Aethyr"
  - [chanting] - Israel Regardie, quoting the English translation of the First Enochian Key.
6. "Hizbollah"
  - "Kad Ataka" - Fairuz, Lebanese singer
7. "The Land of Rape and Honey"
  - "Sieg..." "...Heil!" [chanting] - from the 1979 film The Tin Drum. These chants are used ironically in the song, which is opposed to Naziism and totalitarianism, and the band gave context to the Nazi chants by ranting about political issues during concerts. This was still misinterpreted by white power skinheads as the band's support for Nazism. Jourgensen said the band jumped into the crowd and fought the skinheads, but rumors persisted that the band was fascist.
8. "You Know What You Are"
  - "You know what you are" - closing dialog by Tuco from the 1966 film The Good, the Bad and the Ugly
  - [Macabre Laugh] -from the 1964 film A Fistful of Dollars
  - "Die, Motherfucker!" - from the 1986 film Aliens
  - "C'mon, motherfuckers!" "Dance, motherfucker!" - from the 1986 film Platoon
10. "Flashback"
  - "Now hold up, man!" "Do it," "Everybody's got to die sometime," "I'm hurtin' real bad inside" - Platoon
11. "Abortive"
  - "T minus 10, 9, 8, 7, 6, 5, 4; we've got the main engine start—we have main...", "America's first space shuttle!" "And the shuttle has cleared the tower." - sourced from NASA broadcasts

== Personnel ==
=== Ministry ===
- Al Jourgensen – vocals, guitars, programming
- Paul Barker – bass, keyboards, programming

=== Additional personnel ===
- William Rieflin – drums, programming, keyboards, guitars, backing vocals
- Chris Connelly – backing vocals (tracks 2 & 3)

=== Production ===
- Ministry – production, engineering
- Eddie Echo – production (track 11)
- Steve Spapperi – engineering
- Julian Herzfeld – engineering
- Keith "Fluffy" Auerbach – engineering
- "Dog" (a pseudonym of Al Jourgensen) – album cover
- "Ill" (a pseudonym of Paul Barker) – album cover
- Brian Shanley – album cover

== Chart positions ==
Chart (1988)	Peak position
US Billboard 200	164

== Bibliography ==
- Jourgensen, Al & Wiederhorn, Jon (2013). Ministry: The Lost Gospels According To Al Jourgensen. Boston, MA: Da Capo Press. ISBN 9780306822186 – via the Internet Archive.
