= (Every Day Is) Halloween =

Song by Ministry

"All Day / (Every Day Is) Halloween"

Single by Ministry
- A-side: "All Day"
- B-side: "(Every Day Is) Halloween"
- Released: 1984; October 31, 2019 (acoustic version)
- Genre: Synth-pop; industrial; new wave
- Label: Wax Trax!
- Songwriter: Al Jourgensen
- Producer: Al Jourgensen

Ministry singles chronology
| "Nature of Love" (1983) | "All Day / (Every Day Is) Halloween" (1984) | "Over the Shoulder" (1985) |

Professional ratings
Review scores
| Source | Rating |
|---|---|
| AllMusic | 2/5 stars |

"All Day" and "(Every Day Is) Halloween" are songs by American industrial band Ministry, written and produced by Al Jourgensen. They were originally released by Wax Trax! Records in 1984 as Ministry's "comeback" single following their departure from Arista Records, with "All Day" on the A-side and "(Every Day Is) Halloween" on the B-side, respectively. In 1987, they were included on the compilation album Twelve Inch Singles (1981–1984).

== Composition ==
"All Day" has been described as a "hard-rocking antidote to Depeche Mode's sissy synth-pop." Its lyrics are about class inequality, how the common man works hard, but makes little profit compared to the rich, who sit around. "(Every Day Is) Halloween" is a synth-pop, industrial, and new wave song. Music writer Dave Thompson described it as being "adopted as the anthem of America's disenfranchised Gothic community," who are mocked for the way they dress.

== Legacy ==
A remixed version of "All Day", titled "All Day Remix", was featured on Ministry's second studio album Twitch. A synth-pop song, it adds distorted vocals and a sample; "I don't make the rules to give to you. Whether you like it or not, this world is not too easy. Reality is here. It's knockin' on the door. Y'all know it's beatin' the damn door down."

"(Every Day Is) Halloween" is featured in the 1998 Rhino Records compilation Just Can't Get Enough: New Wave Halloween and used in an Old Style Dry beer commercial in the US. This popularized the song in dance clubs.

On October 31, 2019, it was re-released as an acoustic version with Dave Navarro on guitar. On March 21, 2025, it was re-recorded again as "Every Day Is Halloween (Squirrely Version)", and included on remix album The Squirrely Years Revisited a week later.

== Track listing ==
| No. | Title | Length |
|---|---|---|
| 1. | "All Day" | 5:51 |
| 2. | "(Every Day Is) Halloween" | 6:35 |

=== 1986 12" ===
| No. | Title | Length |
|---|---|---|
| 1. | "Halloween (Remix)" | 10:41 |
| 2. | "Nature of Outtakes" | 8:10 |

=== 2010 digital single ===
| No. | Title | Length |
|---|---|---|
| 1. | "Every Day Is Halloween" | 6:24 |
| 2. | "Every Day Is Halloween" (2010 Version) | 4:29 |

=== Every Day Is Halloween: The Remixes ===
| No. | Title | Length |
|---|---|---|
| 1. | "Every Day Is Halloween" | 6:24 |
| 2. | "Every Day Is Halloween" (Nu Wave Version) | 6:03 |
| 3. | "Every Day Is Halloween" (Al Jourgensen Mix) | 4:29 |
| 4. | "Every Day Is Halloween" (Razed in Black Remix) | 4:24 |
| 5. | "Every Day Is Halloween" (Leather Strip Remix) | 4:46 |
| 6. | "Every Day Is Halloween" (Tre Lux cover version) | 4:17 |

== Personnel ==
Credits adapted from liner notes of the "All Day / (Every Day Is) Halloween" single, Twelve Inch Singles (1981–1984) and Twitch.

- Al Jourgensen – vocals, instrumentation, production
- Brad Hallen – bass ("All Day")
- Stephen George – drums ("All Day")
- Patty Jourgensen – backing vocals ("All Day Remix")
- Brian Shanley and Jim Nash – artwork (single)

== See also ==
- Ministry discography
