= Over the Shoulder =

1985 single by Ministry

Single by Ministry

from the album Twitch
- B-side: "Isle of Man" (Version II); "Twitch" (Version II)
- Released: November 1985
- Genre: Electro-industrial
- Length: 6:44 (single version); 5:13 (album version)
- Label: Sire
- Songwriter: Al Jourgensen
- Producer: Adrian Sherwood

Ministry singles chronology
"(Every Day Is) Halloween" (1985)	"Over the Shoulder" (1985)	"Stigmata" (1988)

Music video
- “Over the Shoulder” on YouTube

"Over the Shoulder" is a song by American industrial band Ministry, from their second studio album, Twitch (1986). Written by frontman Al Jourgensen, produced by Adrian Sherwood, and released in November 1985 as a 12-inch single, it was the band's first recording after signing with Sire Records; the accompanying music video was directed by Peter Christopherson.

== Composition ==
"Over the Shoulder" has been described as an early example of electro-industrial, as well as synth-pop and synthrock. On Twitch, it is the fifth track with a length of five minutes and thirteen seconds; the single version is six minutes and forty-four seconds long. Musically, the song contains multiple layers of looped synthesizer parts along with distinctive heavy drum machine pattern and Jourgensen's soft vocal approach; Billboard editors compared this approach with music of Scritti Politti and Bee Gees, while in 2006, Miami New Times' Jean Carey wrote that the song "sounds like a giant mosquito." In a later review for the March 1986 issue of Spin Magazine, columnist John Leland praised Sherwood's work with Ministry's “typically banal ideas.”

The single version of "Over the Shoulder" and "Isle of Man" were included as additional tracks on compact disc edition of Twitch in 1990; the song was also to be featured on a 2001 compilation album Greatest Fits, but was left off due to medium limitations.

== Reception ==
John Leland at Spin said, "Voices and instruments come and go without warning, and the beat-box assault regularly cuts itself in two. This is big beat music that never stays still long enough for you to get the pin between its shoulder blades or defend yourself against the next percussive wallop."

== Music video ==
The music video for "Over the Shoulder" was directed by Peter Christopherson. It consists of footage of two teenagers stealing a car, trashing a grocery store, making a nails-and-motor oil omelet, and driving off with no apparent consequence.

According to Jourgensen, the director (Note: In various interviews, Jourgensen believes the director to be either Christopherson or Storm Thorgerson.) hired two kids to perform actions featured in the video. When the band asked to film in a store, the owner refused. The director allegedly paid the same kids to break into the store and trash it, and the band asked once again. The owner, needing money to pay for cleanup, agreed. As Jourgensen put it, "Everything that happened on that video was criminal."

In 2000, the video of “Over the Shoulder” was featured on compilation album Tapes of Wrath.

== Track listing ==
No.	Title	Length
1.	"Over the Shoulder" (12" Version)	6:44
2.	"Isle of Man" (Version II)	4:33
3.	"Twitch" (Version II)	1:59

== Personnel ==
Credits adapted from liner notes of Twitch.

- Al Jourgensen – songwriting, musical performance
- Adrian Sherwood – production
