= Atomic Blonde (soundtrack) =

2017 film soundtrack album

Atomic Blonde (Original Motion Picture Soundtrack)

Soundtrack album by Tyler Bates
- Released: July 28, 2017
- Genres: New wave; pop rock; synth-pop
- Length: 69:45
- Label: Back Lot Music

Tyler Bates chronology
Guardians of the Galaxy Vol. 2 (2017)	Atomic Blonde (Original Motion Picture Soundtrack) (2017)	Keep Watching (2017)

Atomic Blonde (Original Motion Picture Soundtrack) is the soundtrack album to the 2017 film Atomic Blonde directed by David Leitch. The film's original score is composed and produced by Tyler Bates and was released through Back Lot Music on July 28, 2017.

== Background ==
From the start, director David Leitch felt that using the right songs for Atomic Blonde (2017) was crucial. Part of this was attempting to answer the question "How do you reinvent this stuffy Cold War spy movie?" The soundtrack uses a combination of 1980s songs as well as covers of them. The latter were used to add "a contemporized feeling of the '80s". The movie's producers were initially worried that they would not be able to get the rights to all the songs that Leitch wanted to use, but Leitch himself estimated that around 75% of his picks made it into the final product. Though the Berlin Wall fell in 1989, the concentration of iconic songs was from the first half of the 1980s, with the exception of George Michael's 1988 chart-topping "Father Figure", which itself was Leitch's second choice after the 1986 release "Take My Breath Away" by Berlin. Angela Watercutter of Wired noted that the use of streaming media made the makers easily access the music catalog and helped in the licensing.

== Release ==
The soundtrack was released through Back Lot Music on July 28, 2017. A vinyl edition of the album, published by Mondo was released on August 25, 2017.

== Reception ==
Matt Collar of AllMusic said that the soundtrack "features an evocative collection of '80s-era tracks that fit nicely into the 1989-set actioner".

== Accolades ==
Award	Date of ceremony	Category	Result	Ref.
Golden Trailer Awards	June 6, 2017	Best Music	Nominated	
St. Louis Film Critics Association	December 17, 2017	Best Soundtrack	Nominated	

== Track listing ==
No.	Title	Artist(s)	Length
1.	"Cat People (Putting Out Fire)"	David Bowie	6:41
2.	"Major Tom (Völlig losgelöst)"	Peter Schilling	4:58
3.	"Blue Monday"	HEALTH	4:46
4.	"C*cks*cker"	Tyler Bates	1:47
5.	"99 Luftballons"	Nena	3:51
6.	"Father Figure"	George Michael	5:37
7.	"Der Kommissar"	Robert Ponger & Falco	5:40
8.	"Cities in Dust"	Siouxsie and the Banshees	4:03
9.	"The Politics of Dancing"	Re-Flex	3:56
10.	"Stigmata"	Ministry	5:36
11.	"Demonstration"	Tyler Bates	3:44
12.	"I Ran (So Far Away)"	A Flock of Seagulls	5:06
13.	"99 Luftballons"	Kaleida	3:53
14.	"Voices Carry"	'Til Tuesday	4:18
15.	"London Calling"	The Clash	3:20
16.	"Finding the UHF Device"	Tyler Bates	2:49
Total length:			69:45

== Additional music ==
Other songs in the film, but not included in the soundtrack:

No.	Title	Music	Producer	Length
1.	"Blue Monday 1988 [12" Version]"	New Order		7:09
2.	"Fight the Power"	Public Enemy	Hank Shocklee, Carl Ryder, Eric Sadler	5:23
3.	"Behind the Wheel"	Depeche Mode		5:17
4.	"Kack Zukunft"	Ausschlag		2:00
5.	"As Time Goes By"	Nicki Parrott		4:02
6.	"Fastidious Horses"	Vladimir Vysotsky		5:38
7.	"Under Pressure"	Queen & David Bowie		3:58

== Chart performance ==
Chart (2017)	Peak position
UK Compilation Albums (OCC)	77
UK Album Downloads (OCC)	35
UK Soundtrack Albums (OCC)	10
US Billboard 200	79
US Independent Albums (Billboard)	3
US Top Soundtracks (Billboard)	11
