= Bad Blood (Ministry song) =

Song by Ministry

Single by Ministry

from the album Dark Side of the Spoon and The Matrix: Music from the Motion Picture
- Released: September 14, 1999
- Genre: Industrial metal
- Length: 4:59
- Label: Warner Bros.
- Songwriters: Al Jourgensen; Paul Barker; Rey Washam; Ty Coon
- Producers: Hypo Luxa; Hermes Pan

Ministry singles chronology
"Supermanic Soul" (1999)	"Bad Blood" (1999)	"What About Us?" (2001)

"Bad Blood" is a song by industrial metal band Ministry.

The song was the second single from the band's 1999 album Dark Side of the Spoon. The song is featured on the soundtrack for the film The Matrix. The song was nominated for the Grammy Award for Best Metal Performance at the 42nd Grammy Awards in 2000. This single also features the song "Happy Dust", an instrumental piece that was never released on any of the band's albums or compilations to date, aside from the Japanese edition of Dark Side of the Spoon. It was however used as the intro and outro for the Sphinctour DVD.

== Track listing ==
No.	Title	Writer(s)	Length
1.	"Bad Blood"	Jourgensen, Barker, Coon, Washam	4:59
2.	"Happy Dust" (Instrumental)	Jourgensen, Barker	6:18
3.	"Bad Blood" (Radio edit)		4:09

== Personnel ==
Ministry

- Al Jourgensen – vocals, electronics
- Louis Svitek – guitar
- Paul Barker – bass, electronics
- Rey Washam – drums

Additional

- Ty Coon – vocals
