= Dark Side of the Spoon =

Studio album by Ministry
- Released: June 8, 1999
- Recorded: 1998–1999
- Genre: Industrial metal
- Length: 57:08
- Label: Warner Bros.
- Producers: Hypo Luxa; Hermes Pan

Ministry chronology
| Filth Pig (1996) | Dark Side of the Spoon (1999) | Greatest Fits (2001) |

Singles from Dark Side of the Spoon
- 1. "Supermanic Soul" Released: 1999; 2. "Bad Blood" Released: September 17, 1999

Dark Side of the Spoon is the seventh studio album by American industrial metal band Ministry, released on June 8, 1999, by Warner Bros. Records. "Bad Blood" was nominated for a Grammy Award for Best Metal Performance in 2000.

== Music and lyrics ==
Dark Side of the Spoon features less aggressive songs than Ministry's previous albums, and frontman Al Jourgensen had intended it to be the case. He wanted to branch out from the "drug-infused" records of The Mind Is a Terrible Thing to Taste and Psalm 69 to more "unfamiliar territory".

In his autobiography, Jourgensen confirmed that the title has two meanings: one of which is a play on words referencing Pink Floyd's The Dark Side of the Moon and the other is the blackened (or dark) side of a spoon heated to dissolve heroin, as several members of the band suffered from long-term addiction to said substance at the time.

The saxophone part of the song "10/10" is taken from the last 22 seconds of "Group Dancers" on the Charles Mingus album The Black Saint and the Sinner Lady. "Whip and Chain" and "Bad Blood" feature vocals from Ty Coon, Al Jourgensen's girlfriend at the time.

== Artwork ==
The album's cover, which features a nude, obese woman sitting in front of a black board with "I will be god" written repeatedly on it; gained controversy and resulted in the album being pulled from Kmart. Jourgensen originally had the idea of having a child drawing on the blackboard, but Barker suggested to have a fat woman instead to evoke the image of "fattened Americans doing what they're told." Joe DaVita of Loudwire interpreted the artwork as depicting "the nightmare where you think you're naked in school."

== Reception and legacy ==
Professional ratings
Review scores
| Source | Rating |
|---|---|
| AllMusic | 2.5/5 stars |
| Collector's Guide to Heavy Metal | 6/10 |
| Entertainment Weekly | C+ |
| Kerrang! | 5/5 stars |
| NME | 6/10 |
| Q | 3/5 stars |
| Rolling Stone | 2/5 stars |
| The Rolling Stone Album Guide | 1.5/5 stars |
| Spin | 6/10 |

AllMusic critic Steve Huey wrote: "While it is a better record than Filth Pig, that's largely because of a few strong moments propping up a number of surprisingly bland attempts at aggression." Huey further stated that the record "can't be considered the successful expansion of their sound that would bode well for the future." Elisabeth Vincentelli of Entertainment Weekly thought that "time may have finally caught up with these thrash-industrial veterans", remarking that the record "doesn't get that fast or heavy again" after the first track, "Supermanic Soul". Describing the record as "a contrary beast", NME wrote that the record "amounts to an uneven, frequently unfunny knot of confusion" and further stated: "It's as though Jourgensen's swapped his black humour for a black dog that won't stop howling, however much he beats it." In a five-star review for Kerrang!, Steffan Chirazi called the album "a deliciously realised composite of Ministry's finest characteristics. It's fast enough to satisfy the Psalm 69... fans and perverse enough for the more bitter and twisted freaks amongst their audience."

Reviewing for Rolling Stone, Neva Chonin thought that the record "sinks into the same complacent rut" as Filth Pig, further explaining: "From the stentorian rhythms and predictably ghoulish vocal samples to the bellowed doomsday incantations and chugging wall of guitars, everything here feels like a reflex." Spin critic Mark Lepage wrote that Dark Side of the Spoon does not achieve the standards that the band set on Psalm 69, "not delivering enough of the medicine."

In 2021, Jourgensen listed "Nursing Home" and "Supermanic Soul" in his top ten favorite Ministry songs.

In 2024, Joe DaVita of Loudwire included the album in his list of "60 Hilariously Awful Metal Album Covers".

== Track listing ==
| No. | Title | Writer(s) | Length |
|---|---|---|---|
| 1. | "Supermanic Soul" | Jourgensen, Barker, Washam, Svitek, Hukic | 3:13 |
| 2. | "Whip and Chain" | Jourgensen, Barker, Svitek, Coon | 4:23 |
| 3. | "Bad Blood" | Jourgensen, Barker, Washam, Coon | 4:59 |
| 4. | "Eureka Pile" | Jourgensen, Barker, Washam, Svitek | 6:22 |
| 5. | "Step" | Jourgensen, Barker, Washam | 4:06 |
| 6. | "Nursing Home" | Jourgensen, Barker, Washam | 7:02 |
| 7. | "Kaif" | Jourgensen, Barker, Washam, Svitek | 5:25 |
| 8. | "Vex & Siolence" | Jourgensen, Barker, Washam, Svitek, Hukic | 5:24 |
| 9. | "10/10" (instrumental) | Jourgensen, Barker, Washam, Svitek | 3:53 |
| 69. | "Everybody (Summertime)" (hidden track) | Jourgensen, Barker, Washam, Svitek | 1:55 |

=== Hidden tracks ===
After the end of track 9, are 59 tracks of silence totaling 10:36. "Everybody" is track 69. Houses of the Molé, another Ministry album, features a hidden track called "Walrus" which is also track 69. According to BMI, track 69 is called "Summertime". AllMusic and the official website of the band refer to this track as "Everybody". ITunes lists this track as "Dialogue".

== Personnel ==
=== Ministry ===
- Al Jourgensen – vocals, guitar, slide guitar, electronics, banjo (6), saxophone (6), production
- Paul Barker – bass, electronics, vocals (8), production
- Rey Washam – drums, electronics
- Louis Svitek – guitar, electronics
- Zlatko Hukic – guitar, electronics

=== Additional personnel ===
- Ty Coon – vocals (2, 3)
- Yvonne Gage – vocals (4)
- Linda – vocals (69)
- Jason Bacher – engineering
- Jeff Dehaven – engineering
- Bryan Kenny – engineering
- Esther Nevarez – engineering
- Brad Kopplin – engineering
- Tom Baker – mastering
- Paul Elledge – art direction, photography

== Charts ==
Chart performance for Dark Side of the Spoon
| Chart (1999) | Peak position |
|---|---|
| Australian Albums (ARIA) | 98 |
| German Albums (Offizielle Top 100) | 57 |
| Swedish Albums (Sverigetopplistan) | 51 |
| UK Albums (OCC) | 85 |
| US Billboard 200 | 92 |
