= In Case You Didn't Feel Like Showing Up =

Live album by Ministry
- Released: September 4, 1990
- Recorded: February 22, 1990
- Venues: Holiday Star Theatre, Merrillville, Indiana
- Genre: Industrial metal
- Length: 39:47
- Label: Sire
- Producers: Hypo Luxa; Hermes Pan

Ministry chronology
The Mind Is a Terrible Thing to Taste (1989)	In Case You Didn't Feel Like Showing Up (1990)	Psalm 69 (1992)

Alternative cover
- 2017 re-release

In Case You Didn't Feel Like Showing Up is a live album by American industrial metal band Ministry, released on September 4, 1990, by Sire Records.

== Critical reception and legacy ==
Professional ratings
Review scores
Source	Rating
AllMusic	3/5 stars
Encyclopedia of Popular Music	3/5 stars
Entertainment Weekly	B
Kerrang!	5/5 stars
MusicHound Rock	2.5/5 stars
Q	4/5 stars
The Rolling Stone Album Guide	4/5 stars
Spin	no score
Spin Alternative Record Guide	8/10
The Village Voice	A−

In 2005, In Case You Didn't Feel Like Showing Up was ranked number 328 in Rock Hard magazine's book of The 500 Greatest Rock & Metal Albums of All Time.

== Track listing ==
No.	Title	Length
1.	"The Missing"	3:35
2.	"Deity"	3:38
3.	"So What"	11:29
4.	"Burning Inside"	6:23
5.	"Thieves"	5:09
6.	"Stigmata"	9:31

== Live Necronomicon ==
This 2017 re-release features more songs including covers from side-projects and bands like Lard, a Jourgensen and Barker side project featuring Jello Biafra, and Skinny Puppy with their frontman Nivek Ogre on vocals. In addition, the songs that had already appeared on In Case You Didn't Feel Like Showing Up (e.g., "The Missing") are presented raw and without any of the overdubbing present on the initial release.

=== Disc 1 ===
No.	Title	Writer(s)	Length
1.	"Breathe"	Al Jourgensen, Paul Barker, William Rieflin, Chris Connelly, Kevin Ogilvie	8:37
2.	"The Missing"	Jourgensen	3:37
3.	"The Deity"	Jourgensen	3:29
4.	"Man Should Surrender" (Pailhead cover)	Jourgensen, Barker, Rieflin, Ian MacKaye	3:54
5.	"No Bunny" (Pailhead cover)	Jourgensen, Barker, Rieflin, MacKaye, Eric Spicer	6:15
6.	"Smothered Hope" (Skinny Puppy cover)	Ogilvie, Kevin Crompton	5:11
7.	"So What"	Jourgensen, Barker, Rieflin, Connelly	11:19
8.	"Burning Inside"	Jourgensen, Barker, Rieflin, Connelly	6:38

=== Disc 2 ===
No.	Title	Writer(s)	Length
1.	"Thieves"	Jourgensen, Barker, Connelly, Ogilvie	5:09
2.	"Stigmata"	Jourgensen	9:52
3.	"Public Image" (Public Image Ltd cover)	John Lydon, Keith Levene, Jah Wobble, Jim Walker	2:47
4.	"The Power of Lard" (Lard cover)	Jourgensen, Barker, Jeff Ward, Jello Biafra	8:11
5.	"Hellfudge" (Lard cover)	Jourgensen, Barker, Ward, Biafra	7:03
6.	"The Land of Rape & Honey"	Jourgensen, Barker	5:36

== Video ==
A companion home video VHS also exists, featuring the same tracks as the audio except it is bookended by two "bonus" songs, "Breathe" and "The Land of Rape and Honey", and incorporates footage from two concerts, including the Merrillville, Indiana concert and a December 1989 New Year's Eve concert in Chicago. According to Patty Marsh (Al Jourgensen's wife in this time), the band were annoyed at having to wear exactly the same clothing on both concert dates and the video was difficult to edit properly due to small differences in each.

The beginning of the concert starts with a very textured dual drum jam then segues into "Breathe". After playing "Stigmata", Jello Biafra comes on stage and reads his own rendition of The Pledge of Allegiance. After that, the band returns for an encore of "The Land of Rape and Honey." Biafra remains on stage giving an almost dadaist performance art routine, largely alternating between sucking his thumb and giving a Nazi salute.

== Personnel ==
=== Ministry ===
- Al Jourgensen – vocals, guitar, production, art direction
- Paul Barker – bass, keyboards, production
- Bill Rieflin – electric drums
- Chris Connelly – keyboards, vocals (lead vocals on "So What")
- Mike Scaccia – guitar
- Martin Atkins – drums
- Terry Roberts – guitar
- Nivek Ogre – keyboards, guitar, vocals
- William Tucker – guitar
- Joe Kelly – background vocals
- Jello Biafra – flag pledge

=== Additional personnel ===
- Jeff "Critter" Newell – engineer
- Michael Balch – monitor sound
- Lee Popa – live sound
- Mark Durante – guitar technician
- Alex Fields – keyboard technician
- Kim Assaley – artwork
- Tom Recchion – design
- Dirk Walter – design
- Dan Fields – production manager
- Sean Joyce – stage manager
- Mark Siemer – additional design
- "Friskie" – assistant engineer
- "Linus" – assistant engineer
- "Ex-Con" – assistant engineer
