= Burning Inside (song) =

1989 single by Ministry

Single by Ministry

from the album The Mind Is a Terrible Thing to Taste
- B-side: "Thieves"
- Released: November 7, 1989
- Genre: Industrial metal; alternative metal
- Length: 5:16
- Label: Sire, Warner Bros.
- Songwriters: Al Jourgensen, Paul Barker, Bill Rieflin, Chris Connelly
- Producers: Hypo Luxa, Hermes Pan

Ministry singles chronology
"Stigmata" (1988)	"Burning Inside" (1989)	"Jesus Built My Hotrod" (1991)

Music video
- “Burning Inside” on YouTube

"Burning Inside" is a song by American industrial metal band Ministry. It was released as the sole single from the band's 1989 album The Mind Is a Terrible Thing to Taste.

The song is featured in the intro movie of the video game Scarface: The World Is Yours.

== Track listing ==
No.	Title	Length
1.	"Burning Inside" (12" Remix)	6:45
2.	"Thieves" (12" Remix)	5:33
3.	"Smothered Hope" (Skinny Puppy cover; live with Nivek Ogre)	5:00

== Background ==
=== Video ===
A video for the song was released in late 1989 and became a hit on MTV's 120 Minutes. The video features the band's live show with the steel fence used on the 1989-1990 tour and later a live version of the song featured on In Case You Didn't Feel Like Showing Up. Also shown in the video are a chaotic audience, a few people on fire, and the band performing onstage. The music video was directed by Eric A. Zimmerman and Ben Stokes through their production company H-GUN Labs in Chicago.

=== Cover ===
The single's cover appears to depict People's Liberation Army soldiers, with one individual holding Mao's red book.

== Personnel ==
=== Ministry ===
- Al Jourgensen - vocals (1, 2), guitar, programming (1, 2), production
- Paul Barker - bass guitar, programming (1, 2), production

=== Additional personnel ===
- Bill Rieflin - drums (1, 2), programming (1, 2), guitar (3)
- Joe Kelly - background vocals (1)
- Nivek Ogre - vocals (3)
- Jeff Ward - drums (3)
- Dave Ogilvie - keyboards (3)
- Tom Baker - mastering

== Covers ==
The song was covered in 2000 by the heavy metal band Static-X, featuring Burton C. Bell of Fear Factory. The cover was featured on the soundtrack to The Crow: Salvation.

== Charts ==
Chart (1990)	Peak position
US Alternative Airplay (Billboard)	23
