= Twitch (Ministry album) =

1986 studio album by Ministry

Studio album by Ministry
- Released: March 12, 1986
- Recorded: 1985
- Studios: Southern Studios, London; Hansa Tonstudio, West Berlin
- Genres: EBM; industrial; synth-pop
- Length: 45:41
- Label: Sire
- Producers: Adrian Sherwood; Alain Jourgensen

Ministry chronology
| With Sympathy (1983) | Twitch (1986) | Twelve Inch Singles (1981–1984) (1987) |

Singles from Twitch
- 1. "Over the Shoulder" Released: November 1985

Twitch (Note: The album was named as the reference to an amphetamine called "Wiz", which was prevalent in Europe; Jourgensen was using it during the recording sessions of Twitch in London as well as later during the recording sessions of the Revolting Cocks album Big Sexy Land in Brussels (Jourgensen & Wiederhorn 2013, p. 59).) is the second studio album by American industrial band Ministry, released on March 12, 1986, by Sire Records. Recorded mostly in London and West Berlin during 1985, it was largely produced by On-U Sound Records owner Adrian Sherwood, while the band's frontman Al Jourgensen co-produced two tracks. It stepped away from the synth-pop-oriented form of Ministry's 1983 debut studio album, With Sympathy, and moved toward a darker, more aggressive sound, heavily influenced by industrial dance groups Cabaret Voltaire and Front 242.

Preceded by "Over the Shoulder", with an accompanying video directed by Peter Christopherson, the album was supported by a concert tour of North America, which was the first to feature Paul Barker and Bill Rieflin in the line-up, playing bass guitar and drums, respectively. The album was released to mixed reviews.

== Background and production ==
Shortly after touring in support of Ministry's 1983 debut album, With Sympathy, Al Jourgensen and bandmates moved to Evanston, Illinois, and proceeded to record what was to be Ministry's second album with Arista Records. Amid differences in the upcoming recording's style, the band left Arista in Spring 1984, following a legal dispute, and returned to Wax Trax! Records, their original label. In that year's Autumn, Ministry embarked on the tour of the East Coast with Belgian industrial dance band Front 242 as a supporting act; according to various accounts, Jourgensen began working on new music either during that tour or the same time With Sympathy was recorded. In his 2013 autobiography, Ministry: The Lost Gospels..., Jourgensen said that during an aforementioned tour, Seymour Stein had attended several gigs trying to offer the band a new deal with his record label Sire Records, a Warner Bros. Records subsidiary. As various accounts state, Jourgensen declined an offer, recalling his experience with Arista, but eventually volunteered, setting conditions that Sire would give Jourgensen complete creative control over his work, and would give resources to buy a Fairlight CMI synthesizer, and also to support the Wax Trax! imprint; as Jourgensen put it in 2013, "it was kind of a personal sacrifice to keep that company rolling and allow them to keep signing bands." By the Summer of 1985, Ministry released several non-album singles on Wax Trax!: “All Day”, “(Every Day Is) Halloween”, and “The Nature of Love”, before getting signed to Sire. By this point, Jourgensen remained the only official member of Ministry.

Stein subsequently employed On-U Sound Records owner Adrian Sherwood as the record's principal producer, after regarding his remix work on Depeche Mode's 1984 singles "People Are People" and "Master and Servant". Jourgensen, Sherwood, and Keith LeBlanc began work in Chicago in Spring 1985, before relocating in London-based Southern Studios; the later sessions were held in West Berlin at Hansa Tonstudio. Recalling sessions in The Lost Gospels..., Jourgensen mostly regarded Sherwood for production advice, though he expressed dislike about his experience in London, citing cultural differences and conflicts with Sherwood's friends; also he admitted that can't "feel like this one's really mine because it's so Adrian Sherwood-influenced."

The album's cover was designed by Brian Shanley, the in-house artist for Wax Trax! Records. The image is a cropped photograph of Jourgensen covered in cornstarch. The session included Sherwood in the photos, one of which became the cover of the single for Over the Shoulder.

== Style and composition ==
Twitch is more abrasive and beat-driven than Ministry's previous works, moving away from the pop-oriented sound of With Sympathy, and incorporating elements from the growing industrial scene of the mid-1980s. The album's sound is reminiscent of Ministry's contemporary acts in Europe, such as Cabaret Voltaire and Front 242. (Note: Various authors, writing on Ministry and Twitch in particular, considered the album's sound to be influenced by that of Cabaret Voltaire and Front 242.) Primarily an EBM album, it consists of aggressive industrial tracks, like "We Believe" and "Where You at Now?/Crash And Burn/Twitch," as well as brighter synth-pop, like "Over the Shoulder," "All Day Remix" and "The Angel." Twitch has also been described as electronica, dub, Eurodisco and noise rock. Jourgensen's English-accented singing, while carried over from With Sympathy, now has distortion effects. It's also the first Ministry record to use sampling, which became one of their trademarks over the years. The production also features the use of white noise and distortion.

The opening track, "Just Like You", is cited by Jourgensen as his “first real political Ministry song”. “We Believe” is described as a "sequencer hammerlock" and has been compared to the music of Nine Inch Nails. "All Day Remix" is a re-worked version of "All Day", originally the A-side from Wax Trax!'s 1985 single which included “Halloween”; drummer Stephen George and bassist Brad Hallen, who quit the band after 1984, were still credited for their contribution to the original track. "The Angel" features backing vocals from Jourgensen's then-wife Patty; though uncredited, their daughter Adrienne appears as a toddler in this track's intro.

== Promotion ==
=== "Over the Shoulder" single and video ===
The sole single from Twitch, "Over the Shoulder", was released in late November 1985, and marked Ministry's debut on Sire. The song is cited as an early example of electro-industrial, and contains multiple layers of looped synthesizer parts along with distinctive heavy drum machine pattern along with Jourgensen's weak vocal approach, referred to by Billboard editors "as mannered as Scritti Politti heard over the telephone." In the same magazine's "Dance Trax" column, writer Brian Chin described it as “a Bee Gees satire.” In a later review published in the March 1986 issue of Spin Magazine, columnist John Leland praised Sherwood's work with Ministry's "typically banal ideas."

The music video for "Over the Shoulder" was directed by Peter Christopherson. (Note: In various interviews, Jourgensen believes the director to be either Christopherson or Storm Thorgerson.) According to Jourgensen, the director hired two kids to steal a car, then filmed it. When the band asked to film in a store, the owner refused. The director allegedly paid the same kids to break into the store and trash it, and the band asked once again. The owner, needing money to pay for cleanup, agreed. Jourgensen said, "Everything that happened on that video was criminal."

In 2000, the video of "Over the Shoulder" was featured on compilation album Tapes of Wrath; the song was to be featured on a 2001 compilation album Greatest Fits, but was left off due to medium limitations.

=== Tour ===
Following the release of Twitch the band commenced a four-month tour through the US and Canada with a new four-piece line-up; Jourgensen approached former members of the Blackouts—Roland Barker, his brother Paul Barker and Bill Rieflin—to join the band. Both Barkers performed keyboards and bass, respectively; Rieflin joined on drums. Dave “Rave” Ogilvie, then producer of Canadian electro-industrial band Skinny Puppy, joined them as a sound engineer, while Frank Nardiello—future Thrill Kill Kult singer Groovie Mann—was a lighting technician.

== Release ==
Twitch was released on March 12, 1986, by Sire and Warner Bros. Records. Shortly after, it entered Billboard 200 on April 4 for three weeks, peaking at No. 194. A new issue of the album was released on March 13, 1990, featuring tracks from the "Over the Shoulder" single. As of February 2007, the album sold 138,755 copies in the United States.

Twitched, an unauthorized 2003 release by Radioactive Records, is an allegedly alternate version of Twitch, featuring the track listing that the band is said to have intended it to have before the intervention of the record company. It includes previously unreleased alternative versions of tracks from the album.

== Critical reception ==
Professional ratings
Review scores
| Source | Rating |
|---|---|
| AllMusic | 3/5 stars |
| Encyclopedia of Popular Music | 3/5 stars |
| MusicHound Rock | 3/5 stars |
| Musician | positive |
| Robert Christgau | B− |
| The Rolling Stone Album Guide | 2.5/5 stars |
| Spin Alternative Record Guide | 6 / 10 |

Music critic Robert Christgau has described Twitch as "fleetingly gothic, marginally industrial, unrelenting in a vaguely threatening way, they shout "The world is ending" on a crowded dancefloor." Ira Robbins of Trouser Press called the record as "the first steps into a murky swamp that subsumes Jourgensen's distorted, nearly spoken vocals within a pounding electronic rhythm onslaught," while stating: "Although much of this unsuccessful experiment throbs along dully, with haphazard intersections of good new ideas and bad old ideas, the militaristic "All Day Remix" offers a cogent demonstration of the direction Jourgensen is headed." At the time of release, a review in the Omaha World-Herald said, "the ugliness of "Twitch" is captivating. But it stretches the definition to call this "pop," as an album press packet suggests." In a retrospective review, AllMusic critic Alan Escher has stated that "this sounds nothing like any of Ministry's other albums; listeners may hear how they became what they did." Escher also noted: "It's interesting though repetitive at times ("Crash and Burn"), and if you care to listen to Jourgensen's rants, he really does have something to say."

== Track listing ==
All tracks are written by Al Jourgensen.

Twitch – vinyl edition
| No. | Title | Production | Length |
|---|---|---|---|
| 1. | "Just Like You" | Adrian Sherwood | 5:03 |
| 2. | "We Believe" | Sherwood | 5:56 |
| 3. | "All Day Remix" | Jourgensen; Sherwood | 6:03 |
| 4. | "The Angel" | Sherwood | 6:06 |
| 5. | "Over the Shoulder" | Sherwood | 5:13 |
| 6. | "My Possession" | Sherwood | 5:05 |
| 7. | "Where You at Now? / Crash & Burn / Twitch (Version II)" | Jourgensen; Sherwood | 12:15 |

Twitch – CD edition (additional tracks)
| No. | Title | Production | Length |
|---|---|---|---|
| 8. | "Over the Shoulder" (12" Version) | Sherwood | 6:46 |
| 9. | "Isle of Man" (Version II) | Sherwood | 4:30 |

Twitched – 2003 unauthorized release
| No. | Title | Length |
|---|---|---|
| 1. | "Just Like You" | 5:06 |
| 2. | "We Believe" | 5:55 |
| 3. | "The Angel" | 5:55 |
| 4. | "Isle of Man" (Ver. 1) | 3:29 |
| 5. | "Over the Shoulder" | 5:05 |
| 6. | "Possession" | 5:30 |
| 7. | "Abortive" | 3:25 |
| 8. | "Twitch" (Part 1) | 3:49 |
| 9. | "The Angel" (Short Version) | 4:31 |
| 10. | "Over the Shoulder" (Extended Version) | 6:43 |
| 11. | "Isle of Man" (Ver. 2) | 4:34 |
| 12. | "Twitch" (Ver. 2) | 2:01 |

== Personnel ==
Credits adapted from the liner notes of Twitch.

=== Ministry ===
- Al Jourgensen – vocals, production & engineering (3, 7a, 7b)

=== Additional personnel ===
- Adrian Sherwood – production & engineering (1–7a, 7c)
- Gareth Jones – engineering (1)
- Keith LeBlanc – percussion & programming (4)
- Patty Jourgensen – additional vocals (3, 4)
- Brad Hallen – bass (3)
- Stephen George – percussion (3)
- Luc van Acker – vocals (7a)
- Brian Shanley – album cover design, photography

== Chart positions ==
| Chart (1986) | Peak position |
|---|---|
| US Billboard 200 | 194 |

== Bibliography ==
- Greene, Jo-Ann (April 2, 1993). "Ministry". Goldmine (scans). Vol. 19, no. 7 (331). pp. 26, 28, 32, 38, 40. ISSN 1055-2685 – via Prongs.org archive.
- Jourgensen, Al & Wiederhorn, Jon (July 9, 2013). Ministry: The Lost Gospels According To Al Jourgensen. Boston, MA: Da Capo Press. ISBN 9780306822186 – via the Internet Archive.
- Masuo, Sandy (January–February 1996). "Ministry: It's Not Easy Being Mean". Option: Music Culture. No. 66. pp. 66–73. ISSN 0882-178X.
- Reed, S. Alexander (2013). Assimilate: A Critical History of Industrial Music. Oxford University Press. ISBN 978-0-19-983260-6. LCCN 2012-42281. OCLC 1147729910 – via the Internet Archive.
