= Lead into Gold =

Musical side project of Ministry's Paul Barker

Lead Into Gold
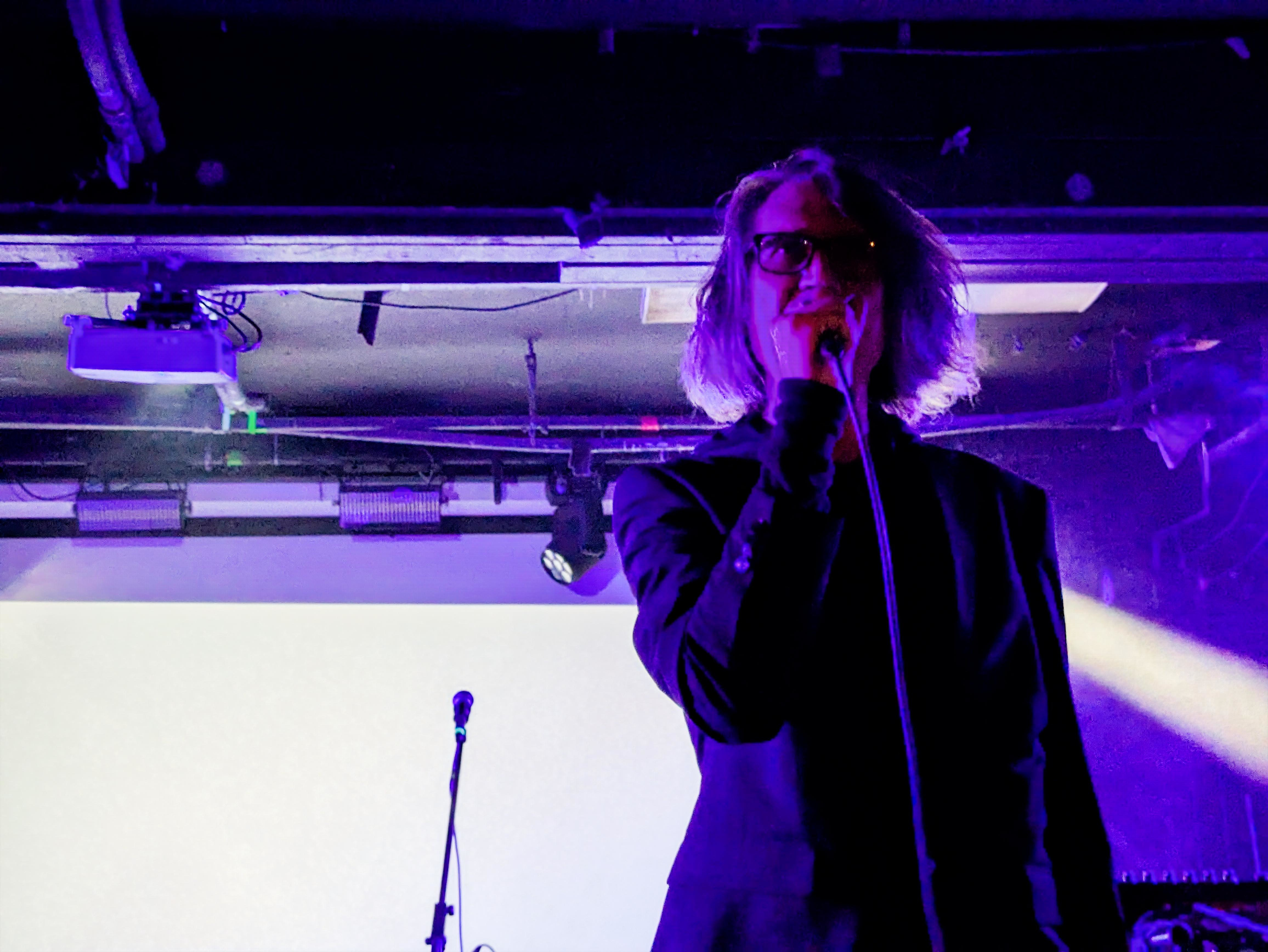
- Paul Barker performs as Lead Into Gold at El Corazon, Seattle, WA, 16 Sept 2025

Background information
- Origin: Portland, Oregon, U.S.
- Genre: Industrial
- Years active: 1988–1991, 2015–present
- Labels: Wax Trax!; No, So Yes
- Members: Paul Barker
- Website: www.paulionbarker.com

Lead into Gold is a side project of American industrial musician Paul Barker, best known as the bassist for Ministry and the Hermes Pan half of the Luxa/Pan production team. Primarily a solo project by Barker, Lead into Gold featured occasional guest performances by his Ministry bandmates Al Jourgensen and Bill Rieflin as well as Stuart Zechman of Stabbing Westward.

== History ==
In its first incarnation, Lead into Gold only released two 12 inch singles and one full-length studio LP. Idiot was the first release in 1988, followed by the Chicks & Speed: Futurism single and Age of Reason album, both released in 1990. The CD release of Chicks & Speed included the Idiot single in its entirety.

Alternative Press characterized Lead Into Gold as a departure from the "all-encompassing industrial dance cloud" of Barker's other projects that delivers a more intellectual music whose lyrics and message makes up for what it lacks in danceability.

In the video for "Faster Than Light", Nine Inch Nails' vocalist Trent Reznor can be seen playing the guitar. He was rumored to have been in the area for the "Head Like a Hole" video shoot when he made his cameo.

=== Revival (2015-present) ===
A limited edition 12” EP titled Low and Slow was released in 2015, roughly 25 years after its recording, on Wax Trax! Records. The tracks are "The Sweetest Kiss", "Cry Baby", "Low & Slow", and a remix of the track "Lunatic/Genius" with additional percussion by Bill Rieflin.

In November 2017, Barker announced that he would be releasing new music under the Lead into Gold name for the first time in 25 years. A 12" single, "A Savage Gift" / "Inside a Golden Sun", was released in February 2018. A full-length album, The Sun Behind the Sun, followed in July 2018.

== Discography ==
=== Studio albums ===
- Age of Reason (1990)
- The Sun Behind the Sun (2018)
- The Eternal Present (2023)
- Knife The Ally (2025)

=== Singles and EPs ===
- Idiot (1988)
- Chicks & Speed: Futurism (1990)
- Faster Than Light (12" promo) (1990)
- Low & Slow (2015)
- A Savage Gift (2018)
