= N.W.O. (song) =

Song by Ministry

Single by Ministry

from the album Psalm 69: The Way to Succeed and the Way to Suck Eggs
- Released: July 1992
- Recorded: 1991
- Genre: Industrial metal
- Length: 5:31
- Label: Sire; Warner Bros.
- Songwriters: Al Jourgensen; Paul Barker
- Producers: Hypo Luxa; Hermes Pan

Ministry singles chronology
"Jesus Built My Hotrod" (1991)	"N.W.O." (1992)	"Just One Fix" (1993)

Music video
- “N.W.O.” on Vimeo

"N.W.O." (New World Order) is a song by American industrial metal band Ministry, released as the opening track and second single from their fifth studio album Psalm 69: The Way to Succeed and the Way to Suck Eggs (1992). An industrial metal song, it was co-written and co-produced by the band’s frontman Al Jourgensen and bassist Paul Barker, and is widely regarded as a protest against then-President George H. W. Bush, featuring samples from his speeches. The song was nominated for a Grammy Award under the Best Metal Performance category in 1993, and was featured in the soundtrack album of Ralph Bakshi’s 1992 film Cool World. In 1994, the song was used in a Spin Magazine commercial which featured Jourgensen, among others. In 2015, "N.W.O." was ranked #10 in the VH1 "Top 10 Hardest Hitting Heavy Metal Political Anthems" list.

== Background ==
The promotional single, featuring two mixes of "N.W.O." and a non-album instrumental track "Fucked", was released around the same time as its parent album and topped out on the Alternative Airplay chart at no. 11. Samples from Apocalypse Now are included in this track: Dennis Hopper's character exclaiming "It's alright!" as the patrol boat is approaching the colonel's fort, as well as the siren that was used during the scene. There is also a loop of the guitar solo coming from a transistor radio in the grenade launcher's bunker.

The song was featured in the video game Need for Speed: The Run. The song was also featured in the video game Call of Duty: Black Ops 6; it can be heard playing from one of the Rovers parked in the SAS Layup during the campaign mission "Hunting Season", as well as in the Chopper Gunner killstreak.

== Music video ==
The music video for "N.W.O." was directed by Peter Christopherson. The majority of the video is a mix of police beatings, riots, and gunfights. It also includes a scene in which a woman dressed as the Statue of Liberty is beaten by police in a manner similar to the famous amateur video of Rodney King being beaten by police. The video was featured on Beavis and Butt-Head along with another track from Psalm 69, "Just One Fix".

Footage from the music video of the Octopus is from the Japanese film Space Amoeba. Footage of the turtle is from the film franchise Gamera.

== Track listing ==
No.	Title	Credit	Length
1.	"N.W.O." (Album Edit)	Al Jourgensen; Paul Barker	4:40
2.	"Fucked"	Barker; Howie Beno	5:06
3.	"N.W.O." (Extended Dance mix)		8:11

== Personnel ==
Credits adapted from the liner notes of the “N.W.O.” single, Psalm 69: The Way to Succeed and the Way to Suck Eggs and Greatest Fits.

- Al Jourgensen – vocals and guitars on “N.W.O.”, programming, production
- Paul Barker – bass on “N.W.O.”, programming, production
- Bill Rieflin – drums on “N.W.O.”
- Howie Beno – programming, editing
- Paul Manno – remix engineer
- Paul Elledge – cover design

== Charts ==
Chart (1992	Peak position
Australia (ARIA)	118
UK (OCC)	49
US Alternative Airplay (Billboard)	11
