= The Mind Is a Terrible Thing to Taste =

1989 studio album by Ministry

Studio album by Ministry
- Released: November 14, 1989
- Recorded: 1988–1989
- Studio: Chicago Trax Studios
- Genre: Industrial metal
- Length: 50:18
- Labels: Sire; Warner Bros.
- Producers: Hypo Luxa; Hermes Pan

Ministry chronology
The Land of Rape and Honey (1988)	The Mind Is a Terrible Thing to Taste (1989)	In Case You Didn't Feel Like Showing Up (1990)

Singles from The Mind Is a Terrible Thing to Taste
- 1. "Burning Inside" Released: November 7, 1989; 2. "So What" Released: 1990

The Mind Is a Terrible Thing to Taste is the fourth studio album by American industrial metal band Ministry, released on November 14, 1989, by Sire Records. The music took a more aggressively guitar-driven direction, with frontman Al Jourgensen inspired by Stormtroopers of Death and Rigor Mortis to add thrash metal guitars to the album and subsequent Ministry releases. As with most of Ministry's work, the album's lyrics deal mainly with political corruption, cultural violence, environmental degradation, nuclear war, drug addiction, and insanity.

== Background ==
Jourgensen recalled the band's state as dysfunctional and the album's production as "complete chaos and mayhem", which gave the band a level of artistic freedom impossible had they planned it. Jourgensen says that despite being a fan favorite, it is not among his favorites because of the condition he was in at the time; he was heavily into drugs during recording and had a poor relationship with his bandmates. In one instance, he chased bassist Paul Barker around the studio with a chair and hit him on the head with it because he "couldn't stand him anymore". Jourgensen credited the era, the city, and the atmosphere at Chicago Trax Studios for the album. Bill Rieflin and Chris Connelly instead attributed the album's sound to the band's interest in technology.

For pre-production, Rieflin said he and Barker watched films for a month, sampling anything that caught their interest. Instead of writing music, they all improvised individually, rarely collaborating with each other. Connelly compared it to exquisite corpse, a Surrealist technique in which an artistic work is created collaboratively without any of the participants having knowledge of the others' contribution. Rieflin cited "So What" as the only track to feature two musicians in the studio at the same time.

After playing with the band on The Land of Rape and Honey's tour, Dave Ogilvie collaborated on this album. The New York-based rapper K-Lite sang vocals on "Test". Jourgensen said that Ministry and K-Lite had been recording songs at the same time at the studio. Both Jourgensen and K-Lite were impressed with the aggressiveness of each other's music, and Jourgensen invited him to contribute vocals for a track. Rieflin had previously recorded drums and bass after he became frustrated waiting for the others to contribute music to the track; Barker said he thinks that Rieflin played all the instruments on the song.

The female spoken word part of "Dream Song" is a recorded conversation with Angelina Lukacin, Jourgensen's future, and now ex-, wife. Jourgensen had met her while on tour in Canada and, impressed with her entertaining personality, called her on the phone several times while working on the album. Jourgensen recalled the conversations as her "babbling about dreams and angels" while high. Lukacin herself said "Dream Song" was a poem she wrote after having a dream about an angel. She did not know she was being recorded but enjoyed the song.

== Album title and art ==
The title is a reference to the United Negro College Fund's slogan, "A mind is a terrible thing to waste". Jourgensen was further inspired by the "Just Say No" anti-drug campaign. Rieflin said the other band members were not fond of the name, but Jourgensen had creative control. According to Connelly, the album art was inspired by a television program Jourgensen saw where migraine sufferers painted images of their pain. The image itself was a picture of an x-ray showing a woman known to the band who had been in a car accident and had a metal plate surgically installed. Jourgensen said he wanted this medical scan image as the album artwork as soon as he found out about it, but the other band members disliked it. Barker praised the concept but said the execution was poor.

== Release ==
The album peaked at #163 in the US and was certified Gold by the RIAA for sales in excess of 500,000 units in December 1995. "Burning Inside" reached #23 on Billboard's Hot Modern Rock Tracks.

== Reception ==
Professional ratings
Review scores
Source	Rating
AllMusic	4.5/5 stars
Chicago Tribune	3/4 stars
Encyclopedia of Popular Music	3/5 stars
Kerrang!	5/5 stars
Metal Storm	10/10
MusicHound Rock	4/5 stars
Robert Christgau	B+
The Rolling Stone Album Guide	3.5/5 stars
Spin Alternative Record Guide	8/10

Music critic Tom Moon included the album in his book 1,000 Recordings to Hear Before You Die, calling it "one of the great works of industrial music" and an influential album that is "way ahead of its time". In rating it 4.5/5 stars, AllMusic reviewer Marc van der Pol described it as a "wonderful album" that avoids the clichés common to industrial rock. Bill Wyman of the Chicago Tribune rated it 3/4 stars and called it Ministry's "best-sounding, most assured and consistent album". The A.V. Club, though praising the album's other tracks, described "Test" as "a novelty genre exercise from which Mind barely recovers". The A.V. Club also wrote about "So What", including it on a list of the best songs written from the point of view of a crazy person. They called it "the most obvious and best-executed" of Ministry's songs about violent psychosis.

== Track listing ==
No.	Title	Writer(s)	Length
1.	"Thieves"	Alain Jourgensen, Paul Barker, Chris Connelly, Kevin Ogilvie	5:02
2.	"Burning Inside"	Jourgensen, Barker, William Rieflin, Connelly	5:20
3.	"Never Believe"	Jourgensen, Barker, Connelly	4:59
4.	"Cannibal Song"	Jourgensen, Barker, Connelly	6:10
5.	"Breathe"	Jourgensen, Barker, Rieflin, Connelly, Ogilvie	5:40
6.	"So What"	Jourgensen, Barker, Rieflin, Connelly	8:14
7.	"Test"	Jourgensen, Barker, Rieflin, K. Lite	6:04
8.	"Faith Collapsing"	Jourgensen, Barker, Rieflin	4:01
9.	"Dream Song"	Jourgensen, Barker	4:48

=== Samples ===
==== "Thieves" ====
- "Get up! Get on your feet!" "You will not kill!" "I can't hear you!" "Pray!" – dialogue from R. Lee Ermey's drill instructor character in Full Metal Jacket. Jourgensen later attributed the use of these samples to director Stanley Kubrick's decision to have Ministry appear in the 2001 film A.I. Artificial Intelligence.
- "I want peace." – Former U.S. President Richard Nixon.
- Further samples include dialogue from The War at Home, a 1979 documentary.

==== "Burning Inside" ====
- (Intro of warning horn and synthesizer tones) - John Carpenter's The Thing (klaxons) and John Carpenter's Prince of Darkness (original score).

==== "Cannibal Song" ====
- "The mind is a labyrinth." is from the film Hellbound: Hellraiser II.

==== "Breathe" ====
- "Opening musical sequence (first 30 seconds)" - taken from the film Cry Freedom.

==== "So What" ====
- The dialogue spoken during the song ("You have had all that money can give you", "Kill for a thrill", etc.) is from the judge's summing up at the end of the Ed Wood-scripted film The Violent Years.
- "Go ahead!", "Assassin...", "Qué?!" and the laughter sample are from the film Scarface.

==== "Faith Collapsing" ====
- The song was inspired by a sample from Fahrenheit 451, and the band brainstormed from there. Other samples include Ingsoc propaganda from 1984.

==== "Dream Song" ====
- Features the Bulgarian State Television Female Vocal Choir singing the song "Kalimankou Denkou" off of the 1975 compilation album Le Mystère des Voix Bulgares.

== Personnel ==
=== Ministry ===
- Al Jourgensen – vocals (1–3, 5, 6, 9), guitars, programming, production
- Paul Barker – bass, programming, production

=== Additional personnel ===
- Bill Rieflin – drums, programming, background vocals (8), bass & drum programming (7, uncredited)
- Mars Williams – saxophone (4)
- Chris Connelly – lead vocals (3, 4), background vocals (5, 6)
- The Grand Wizard (K. Lite) – vocals (7)
- Joe Kelly – background vocals (1)
- Kyle McKeough – background vocals (6)
- Jeff Ward – background vocals (5)
- Dave Ogilvie – background vocals (3, 5, 8), engineer
- The Slogan God (Tommie Boyskee) – vocals (7)
- Bobbie DiBartollo – background vocals (8)
- Angela Lukacen – vocals (9)
- Keith Auerbach – engineer
- Jeff Newell – engineer
- Julian Herzfeld – engineer
- "Dog" – cover design
- "Ill" – cover design
- Maura – cover design
- Tom Young – cover photos
- Tom Baker – mastering

== Charts ==
Chart (1989)	Peak position
US Billboard 200	163
