= Twelve Inch Singles (1981–1984) =

Compilation album by Ministry
- Released: 16 January 1987
- Recorded: 1981–84
- Genre: New wave; dark wave; post-punk; industrial techno
- Length: 54:50
- Label: Wax Trax!
- Producer: Alain Jourgensen; Jay O'Roarke

Ministry chronology
Twitch (1986)	Twelve Inch Singles (1981–1984) (1987)	The Land of Rape and Honey (1988)

Professional ratings
Review scores
Source	Rating
AllMusic	3.5/5 stars
Encyclopedia of Popular Music	3/5 stars
The Rolling Stone Album Guide	2/5 stars
Spin Alternative Record Guide	4/10

Twelve Inch Singles (1981–1984) is a compilation album by American rock band Ministry, first released in 1987 by Wax Trax! Records. It comprises tracks from early non-album singles originally released on the label. The album was reissued by Cleopatra Records in 2014, including a second CD of early tracks.

== Track listing ==
=== Original 1987 release ===
No.	Title	Length
1.	"(Every Day Is) Halloween"	6:26
2.	"The Nature of Love"	6:57
3.	"All Day"	5:53
4.	"Cold Life"	5:12
5.	"Halloween Remix"	10:31
6.	"Nature of Love" (Cruelty Mix B)	6:52
7.	"All Day" (Remix B)	6:38
8.	"Cold Life" (Dub)	6:21

- Tracks 1 and 3 are originally from the All Day single.
- Tracks 2 and 6 are originally from the single The Nature of Love.
- Tracks 4 and 8 are originally from the I'm Falling single.
- Track 5 is originally from the Halloween Remix single.

=== Disc One ===
No.	Title	Length
1.	"(Every Day Is) Halloween"	6:36
2.	"The Nature of Love"	7:04
3.	"All Day"	5:51
4.	"Cold Life"	5:11
5.	"Halloween Remix"	10:25
6.	"Nature of Love" (Cruelty Mix)	6:43
7.	"All Day" (Remix)	6:34
8.	"Cold Life" (Dub)	6:22

=== Disc Two ===
No.	Title	Length
1.	"Same Old Madness"	5:58
2.	"Primental"	5:14
3.	"I'm Falling"	4:24
4.	"Nature Of Outtakes"	8:09
5.	"I'm Falling" (Alternative Mix)	4:04
6.	"Overkill"	4:31
7.	"He's Angry"	3:54
8.	"Move" (Original Mix)	6:21
9.	"Nature Of Love" (Cruelty B Mix)	6:43

== Personnel ==
- Al Jourgensen – vocals, guitar (4, 8), production, engineer (5, 7)
- Thom Moore – engineer (1, 3)
- Patty Jourgensen – additional vocals (2)
- Richard 23 – additional vocals (2)
- Stevo – additional percussion (3), drums (4)
- Jay O'Roarke – production (4)
- Lamont Welton – bass (4)
- Preston – horns (4)
- Steve Brighton – additional vocals (4)
- Jon Mathias – remixing (6), engineer (6)
- Sturm – remixing (6), engineer (6)
- Iain Burgess – engineer (8)
- Nancy Taylor – assistant engineer (8)
- Brian Shanley – album cover
