= Stigmata (song) =

1988 single by Ministry

Single by Ministry

from the album The Land of Rape and Honey
- Released: August 1988
- Genre: Industrial metal
- Length: 5:45
- Label: Sire; Warner Bros.
- Songwriter: Al Jourgensen
- Producers: Hypo Luxa; Hermes Pan

Ministry singles chronology
| "Over the Shoulder" (1986) | "Stigmata" (1988) | "Burning Inside" (1989) |

"Stigmata" is a song by American industrial metal band Ministry. Written by frontman Al Jourgensen, it is the opening track and the only single released from their third studio album, 1988's The Land of Rape and Honey. The song features distorted vocals, guitars and compressed drum machine loops. The song was an underground hit. The music video—which was said to get a regular airing on MTV—features gritty black and white machinery, gears, symbols, the band playing live, Paul Barker on a motorcycle, strobe-like montages of eyes (which are the only elements presented in color), and youths shaving their heads. In 2003, the song was said to be Ministry's "finest moment until 1992".

Stigmata was named one of the "Songs That Shaped Rock and Roll" by the Rock and Roll Hall of Fame. It is Ministry's only contribution to the list.

The track was featured in the episode "Line of Fire" of Miami Vice and later featured in the 1990 science fiction horror movie Hardware and the 1995 Hong Kong action comedy film Rumble in the Bronx. The 2017 action film Atomic Blonde (taking place in 1989) features a cover of the song by Marilyn Manson. The 12-inch single remix of the song was featured in the 2006 video game, Tony Hawk's Project 8. The song was also featured as an unlockable track in the 2009 video game Brütal Legend. In August 2010, the song became available for download in the Rock Band series of games.

In his 2013 autobiography, Ministry: The Lost Gospels..., Jourgensen writes that although "Stigmata" is one of Ministry's most popular songs, he hates it for being "too simplistic" and for its use of sampled rather than actual guitars. He wrote "Stigmata" at the last minute after realising he needed another song to complete the album.

== Track listing ==
| No. | Title | Credit | Length |
|---|---|---|---|
| 1. | "Stigmata" (Remix) | Ministry | 6:57 |
| 2. | "Tonight We Murder" | Ministry/Nardiello | 6:02 |

== Personnel ==
=== Ministry ===
- Al Jourgensen - vocals ("Stigmata"), guitar, programming, production, engineer
- Paul Barker - bass, programming, production, engineer

=== Additional personnel ===
- William Rieflin - drums ("Tonight We Murder"), programming
- Frank Nardiello - vocals ("Tonight We Murder"), cover painting
- Brian Shanley - cover design
