= Paul Barker =

American bass guitarist

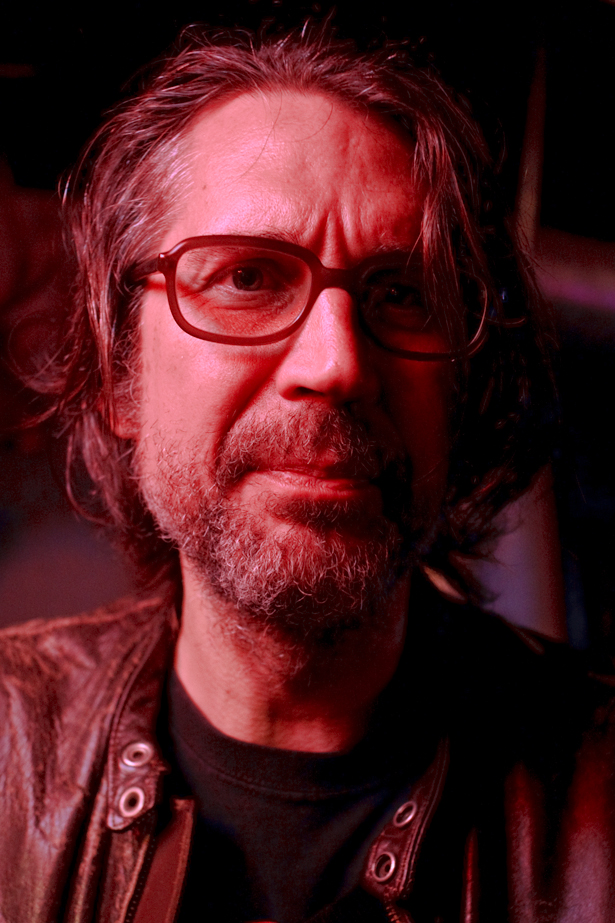
- Barker in 2011

Background information
- Also known as: Hermes Pan, Ion Barker
- Born: February 8, 1959 (age 67); Palo Alto, California, U.S.
- Genres: Industrial metal; alternative metal; post-punk; alternative rock; electronica
- Occupations: Musician, producer
- Instruments: Bass guitar, guitar, programming, keyboards, vocals
- Years active: 1980–present
- Member of: Lead into Gold, U.S.S.A.
- Formerly of: 1000 Homo DJs, Acid Horse, Bells into Machines, The Blackouts, Lard, Ministry, Pink Anvil, Revolting Cocks

Paul Gordon Barker (born February 8, 1959), also referred to as Hermes Pan, is an American musician, best known as the former bass guitarist, producer and engineer for industrial metal band Ministry from 1986 to 2003. Prior to Ministry, he provided bass for the Seattle post-punk ensemble The Blackouts alongside future Ministry drummer Bill Rieflin and his brother, one-time Ministry touring keyboardist/saxophonist Roland Barker, from 1979 until 1985.

== Career ==
=== Ministry ===
Beginning as touring bassist for Ministry's 1986 Twitch tour, Barker collaborated with frontman Al Jourgensen and collectively released The Land of Rape and Honey in 1988. Although many musicians briefly contributed to Ministry in the nearly two-decade period after Barker joined the band, he and Jourgensen were the only continuous members. The dynamics between these two different personalities came to shape Ministry's sound, along with a number of side-projects which they were involved in together.

In 2003, Barker left the band a year after the release of their eighth album, Animositisomina. The decision was made official after the death of his father. Despite being in Ministry for almost 18 years, Jourgensen did not do anything to spur his departure. "Over the years we've had strained relations as well as good times, and the last tour was no different than any other tour. That means it was extremely difficult and very intense and lots of fun," Barker had said.

It is often believed that Jourgensen and Barker were close bandmates and the latter played a huge creative role in the band. Jourgensen has rebuffed these claims in the past, saying that their relationship was more like an arranged marriage and "acrimonious." He said that they were never friends but business partners. After leaving Ministry, Barker distanced himself from Jourgensen for many years, during which the two had almost nothing positive to say about their relationship in the band.

Barker was quoted in a 2011 interview that it was "tough to watch" the band's Fix: The Ministry Movie documentary as he could no longer associate himself with the band. When asked in a 2015 interview if he would ever work with Jourgensen again, he replied, "I'm fairly confident we will not work together. We have zero relationship now." When asked why he left Ministry, he replied he was no longer willing to put up with the stupidity and decided that it was enough.

Barker has since moved on to other things and in 2016, seems to have more or less made peace with Ministry. "Of course, that was a very intense time and extremely rewarding. That was quite a while ago and I rarely think about it. I'm still fascinated with the heaviest, ugliest music and it's now hard to find the time for those pursuits. I am not in direct contact with Al these days."

In 2018, Jourgensen reconciled with Barker after they both made appearances at screenings for the documentary Industrial Accident: The Story of Wax Trax! Records. Jourgensen stated he was eager to collaborate with Barker again. In March 2024, it was announced that Barker would reunite with Jourgensen to write, perform, and produce a Ministry album. Barker will be featured on the final track of Ministry's seventeenth and final album, Hate to Go – Take Out or Delivery.

=== Post-Ministry ===
Since 2003, Barker has spent his time recording new material, producing such acts as I Love You But I've Chosen Darkness and collaborating with artists such as Stayte (on their 2007 Cognitive Dissonance (The Art of Lying To Yourself) EP). He joined U.S.S.A. with Duane Denison (Tomahawk, ex-The Jesus Lizard) as bassist. The first album from his solo project Flowering Blight, entitled The Perfect Pair, was released on November 19, 2008, via the official website.

In 2011, Barker remixed the Deadly Apples song "Self Inflicted Oppression" with samples from Ministry's Psalm 69. The remix was featured on the soundtrack for the documentary film Fix: The Ministry Movie.

Barker released Fix This!!! on April 10, 2012. This album features guests such as Chris Connelly, Ogre, Taylor Momsen, Puscifer, Deadly Apples, Alexis Marshall, Joshua Bradford, and Devix Szell.

In 2015, Barker joined the touring lineup of rock supergroup Puscifer as their bassist.

Barker is also one of the founders of Malekko Heavy Industry Corporation, a manufacturer of synthesizer modules and guitar effect pedals.

=== Lead into Gold ===
Lead into Gold is Barker's current solo project.

In the summer of 2018 he released the full-length album The Sun Behind The Sun, followed by a North America tour with ohGr (Nivek Ogre) and Omniflux (Mahsa Zargaran).

In the spring of 2023 Barker released another full-length album The Eternal Present, followed by a North America tour with Skinny Puppy.

== Bands ==
- The Blackouts (1979–1985)
- Ministry (1986–2003, 2024)
- Pailhead (1987–1988)
- Revolting Cocks (1987–1993, 2016–present)
- Lard (1988–2000)
- Lead into Gold (1988–1990, 2015, 2017–present)
- 1000 Homo DJs (1988, 1990)
- Acid Horse (1989)
- PTP (1989)
- Pigface (1990)
- Pink Anvil (2001, 2003)
- U.S.S.A. (2006–present)
- Flowering Blight (2008)
- Bells into Machines (2013–2022)
- Puscifer (2015, tour)

== Discography ==
=== Studio albums ===
==== Blackouts ====
- Exchange of Goods (1981)
- Lost Souls Club (1985)
- History in Reverse (2004)

==== Lard ====
- The Power of Lard (1989)
- The Last Temptation of Reid (1990)
- Pure Chewing Satisfaction (1997)
- 70's Rock Must Die (2000)

==== Lead Into Gold ====
- Chicks and Speed: FUTURISM (1990)
- Age of Reason (1990)
- Low & Slow (2015)
- A Savage Gift (2018)
- The Sun Behind the Sun (2018)
- The Eternal Present (2023)

==== Ministry ====
- The Land of Rape and Honey (1988)
- The Mind is a Terrible Thing to Taste (1989)
- In Case You Didn't Feel Like Showing Up (Live) (1990)
- Psalm 69: The Way to Succeed and the Way to Suck Eggs (1992)
- Filth Pig (1995)
- Dark Side of the Spoon (1999)
- Sphinctour (Live) (2002)
- Animositisomina (2003)

===== Pailhead =====
- I Will Refuse (1987)
- Trait (1988)

===== Pigface =====
- Gub (1991)

===== Revolting Cocks =====
- Beers, Steers, and Queers (1990)
- Linger Ficken' Good (1993)
