= Wax Trax! Records discography =

This is the discography of Wax Trax! Records.

== Wax Trax Records (1980-1992) ==
No.	Artist	Title	Format	Year
EBR 001	Strange Circuits	Industrial Living	7"	1980
WAX 001	Strike Under	Immediate Action	12"	1981
WAX 002	Divine	Born to Be Cheap	7"	1981
WAX 003	Ministry	Cold Life	12"	1981
WAX 004	Front 242	Endless Riddance	12"/CDS	1983
WAX 005	A Popular History of Signs	Ladder Jack	12"	1984
WAX 006	The Blackouts	Lost Soul's Club	12"	1985
WAX 007	Ministry	All Day / (Every Day Is) Halloween	12"/CS	1985
WAX 008	Minimal Compact	Next One Is Real	12"	1984
WAX 009	Ministry	The Nature of Love	12"	1985
WAX 010	Front 242	No Comment	LP/CS/CD	1984
WAX 010A	Front 242	Take One / U-Men	7"	
WAX 011	Revolting Cocks	No Devotion	12"	
WAX 012	Wiseblood	Motorslug	12"	
WAX 013	Coil	Panic/Tainted Love	12"/CDS	1984
WAX 014	Front 242	Politics of Pressure	12"/CDS	
WAX 015	Luc van Acker	The Ship	LP	
WAX 016	Front 242	Interception	12"/CDS	
WAX 017	Revolting Cocks	Big Sexy Land	LP/CS/CD	1986
WAX 018	Luc van Acker	Heart & Soul	12"	
WAX 019	Boxset	Boxset (Unreleased)	12"	
WAX 020	Ministry	Halloween (Remix) / Nature of Outtakes	12"	1985
WAX 021	The Young Gods	Envoyé!	12"	
WAX 022	Revolting Cocks	You Often Forget	12"	
WAX 023	Luc van Acker	Zanna	12"	
WAX 024	Three Angry Poles	Motorcycle Maniac	12"	
WAX 025	Various Artists	Animal Liberation	LP/CS/CD	
WAX 026	Front 242	Official Version	LP/CS/CD	1987
WAX 027	Fini Tribe	I Want More	12"	
WAX 028	Fini Tribe	Make It Internal (Detestimony Revisited)	12"	1987
WAX 029	Laibach	Life is Life	12"	
WAX 030	Laibach (band)	Opus Dei	CD/CS/CD	1987
WAX 031	Pailhead	I Will Refuse / No Bunny	7"/12"	
WAX 032	1000 Homo DJ's	Apathy / Better Ways	12"	
WAX 033	Front 242	Back Catalogue	CS/CD	
WAX 034	Front 242	Geography	LP/CS/CD	
WAX 035	Ministry	Twelve Inch Singles (1981–1984)	CS/CD	
WAX 036	Front 242	Masterhit	12"/CD	
WAX 037	Revolting Cocks	You Goddamned Son of a Bitch - Live	2xLP/CS/CD/VHS	
WAX 038	Front Line Assembly	Corrosion	LP/CS	
WAX 039	My Life with the Thrill Kill Kult	My Life with the Thrill Kill Kult	12"	
WAX 040	Peter Hope / Richard H. Kirk	Hoodoo Talk	LP/CS/CD	
WAX 041	Front Line Assembly	Disorder	12"	
WAX 042	Revolting Cocks	Stainless Steel Providers	12"/CS?CDS	
WAX 043	Jass	Theme (W.R.)	12"	
WAX 044	Controlled Bleeding	Songs from the Grinding Wall	12"/CDS	
WAX 045	PIG	Never for Fun	12"	
WAX 046	Hula	VC1	12"	
WAX 047	Pailhead	Trait	12"/CS/CD	1988
WAX 048	Front Line Assembly	Convergence	CS/CD	
WAX 049	KMFDM	Don't Blow Your Top	12"	
WAX 050	A Split Second	A Split - Second	LP/CS/CD	
WAX 051	PIG	A Poke in the Eye... with a Sharp Stick	LP/CS/CD	
WAX 052	KMFDM	Don't Blow Your Top	LP/CS/CD	
WAX 053	Front 242	Headhunter	7"/12"/CS/CD/CDV	1988
WAX 054	Front 242	Front by Front	LP/CS/CD	1988
WAX 055	My Life with the Thrill Kill Kult	Some Have to Dance...Some Have to Kill	12"	1988
WAX 056	My Life with the Thrill Kill Kult	I See Good Spirits and I See Bad Spirits	LP/CS/CD	1988
WAX 057	The Young Gods	L'Amourir	12"	1988
WAX 058	T.G.T. (The Genetic Terrorists)	Machine Gun	12"/CS/CDS	
WAX 059	Lead into Gold	Idiot	12"	
WAX 060	Front Line Assembly	Digital Tension Dementia	12"/CDS	1988
WAX 061	A Split Second	Mambo Witch	12"	1988
WAX 062	A Split Second	...From the Inside	LP/CS/CD	1985
WAX 064	In the Nursery	Köda	LP/CS/CD	1988
WAX 065	Meat Beat Manifesto	God O.D.	12"	
WAX 066	Meat Beat Manifesto	Storm the Studio	2x12"/CS/CD	1989
WAX 067	Perennial Divide	Leathernecks (Unreleased)	12"	
WAX 068	Clock DVA	The Hacker	12"/CDS	
WAX 069	Greater Than One	London	LP/CS/CD	1989
WAX 7063	Revolting Cocks	Beers, Steers, and Queers	LP/CS/CD	1990
WAX 7072	Suicide	A Way of Life	LP/CS/CD	1988
WAX 7075	Front Line Assembly	Gashed Senses & Crossfire	LP/CS/CD	1989
WAX 7080	Laibach	Nova Akropola	LP/CS/CD	1986
WAX 7083	KMFDM	UAIOE	LP/CS/CD	1989
WAX 7089	My Life with the Thrill Kill Kult	Confessions of a Knife...	LP/CS/CD	1990
WAX 7090	Controlled Bleeding	Trudge	LP/CS/CD	
WAX 7093	Clock DVA	Advantage (Unreleased)	LP/CS/CD	
WAX 7094	Clock DVA	Buried Dreams	LP/CS/CD	
WAX 7095	Pankow	Gisela	LP/CS/CD	
WAX 7097	Cosey Fanni Tutti	Time To Tell	12"	
WAX 7098	Mussolini Headkick	Themes for Violent Retribution	LP/CS/CD	
WAX 7100	Greater Than One	G-Force	LP/CS/CD	1989
WAX 7101	Noise Unit	Grinding Into Emptiness	LP/CS/CD	1989
WAX 7106	Meat Beat Manifesto	Armed Audio Warfare	LP/CS/CD	1989
WAX 7107	In the Nursery	Counterpoint	LP/CS/CD	1989
WAX 7110	Foetus	Sink	2xLP/CS/CD	
WAX 7113	Ajax	Ajax	LP/CS/CD	
WAX 7115	Joined at the Head	Unknown (Unreleased)	LP	
WAX 7116	Lead into Gold	Age of Reason	LP/CS/CD	1990
WAX 7118	Cyberaktif	Tenebrae Vision	CS/CD	1991
WAX 7120	In The Nursery	L'Esprit	LP/CS/CD	
WAX 7121	Chris & Cosey	Reflection	LP/CS/CD	
WAX 7122	Chris & Cosey	Heartbeat	LP/CS/CD	
WAX 7123	Chris & Cosey	Trance	LP/CS/CD	
WAX 7124	Chris & Cosey	Songs of Love and Lust	LP/CS/CD	
WAX 7125	Chris & Cosey	Techno Primitiv	LP/CS/CD	
WAX 7126	TGT (The Genetic Terrorists)	White Stains	LP/CS/CD	
WAX 7127	Psychic TV (listed as "Various Artists")	Jack the Tab/Tekno Acid Beat	LP/CS/CD	
WAX 7129	Psychic TV	Towards Thee Infinite Beat	LP/CS/CD	
WAX 7130	Psychic TV	Beyond Thee Infinite Beat	LP/CS/CD	
WAX 7134	Chris Connelly	Whiplash Boychild	LP/CS/CD	
WAX 7135	The Young Gods	The Young Gods	LP/CS/CD	
WAX 7136	Doubting Thomas	The Infidel	LP/CS/CD	1991
WAX 7137	Front Line Assembly	Iceolate	12″/CDS	
WAX 7139	KMFDM	What Do You Know, Deutschland?	LP/CS/CD	1986
WAX 7143	Coil	Love's Secret Domain	LP/CS/CD	1991
WAX 7146	Front Line Assembly	Caustic Grip	LP/CS/CD	1990
WAX 7148	KMFDM	Naïve	LP/CS/CD	1990
WAX 7150	Chris & Cosey	Pagan Tango	LP/CS/CD	
WAX 7155	KLF	Chill Out	LP/CS/CD	
WAX 7162	God's Acre	Ten Gospel Greats	LP/CS/CD	
WAX 7163	My Life With The Thrill Kill Kult	Sexplosion!	LP/CS/CD	1991
WAX 7168	Braindead Soundmachine	Come Down from the Hills and Make My Baby	LP/CS/CD	
WAX 7176	Excessive Force	Conquer Your World	LP/CD	1991
WAX 7187	Sister Machine Gun	Sins of the Flesh	LP/CS/CD	1992
WAX 8079	Laibach	Panorama/Die Liebe	12"/CS/CD	
WAX 8085	Pankow	"Freedom For The Slaves"	12"/CS/CD	
WAX 8128	Psychic TV (listed as "Various Artists")	High Jack - The Politics of Ecstasy	CD	
WAX 8169	Wreck	House Of Boris	12"/CS/CD	
WAX 9070	Front 242	Never Stop!	12"/CS/CD	
WAX 9071	Clock DVA	The Act	12"	
WAX 9073	PTP	Rubber Glove Seduction	12"/CS/CD	
WAX 9074	TGT (The Genetic Terrorists)	Revo	12"/CDS	
WAX 9076	A Split Second	The Colosseum Crash	12"/CDS	
WAX 9077	KMFDM	More & Faster	12"	1989
WAX 9078	Greater Than One	I Don't Need God	12"/CDS	
WAX 9081	Acid Horse	No Name, No Slogan	12"/CS/CDS	
WAX 9082	Ajax	Mind the Gap	12"	
WAX 9084	PIG	Sick City	12"	
WAX 9086	Revolting Cocks	"(Let's Get) Physical"	12"/CS/CDS	
WAX 9087	Front Line Assembly	No Limit (Damaged Goods Remix)	12"/CDS	
WAX 9088	My Life with the Thrill Kill Kult	Kooler Than Jesus	12"/CS/CD	
WAX 9091	Controlled Bleeding	The Fodder Song	12"/CDS	
WAX 9092	Lead Into Gold	Chicks And Speed (Futurism)	12"/CS/CD	
WAX 9093	Revolting Cocks	"(Let's Get) Physical (Unreleased)"	12"	
WAX 9099	Greater Than One	Utopia	12"/CS/CDS	
WAX 9102	Noise Unit	Deceit/Struktur	12"	
WAX 9104	TAGC	Broadcast Test	12"	
WAX 9105	Clock DVA	Sound Mirror	12"/CDS	
WAX 9108	KMFDM	Virus	12"/CS/CDS	1989
WAX 9109	Pankow	Show You Their Dongs	12"/CDS	
WAX 9111	Foetus	Butterfly Potion	12"/CDS	
WAX 9112	Ajax	One World	12"	
WAX 9114	Joined at the Head	Joined at the Head	12"	
WAX 9117	Cyberaktif	Temper	12"/CDS	
WAX 9119	Cyberaktif	Nothing Stays	12"/CS/CDS	
WAX 9131	In the Nursery	Sesudient	12″/CDS	
WAX 9132	KMFDM	Godlike	12″/CDS	
WAX 9133	1000 Homo DJs	Supernaut	12″	
WAX 9138	Doubting Thomas	Father Don't Cry	12″/CSS/CDS	
WAX 9140	My Life with the Thrill Kill Kult	A Girl Doesn’t Get Killed by a Make-Believe Lover… 'Cuz It's Hot	12″/CSS/CDS	
WAX 9141	Chris Connelly	Stowaway	12″/CDS	
WAX 9142	Coil	Windowpane	12″/CDS/PD	
WAX 9144	Coil	The Snow	12″/CDS	
WAX 9145	Front Line Assembly	Provision	12″/CDS	1990
WAX 9147	Front Line Assembly	Virus	12″/CDS	
WAX 9149	Revolting Cocks	Beers, Steers & Queers (Remixes)	12″/CSS/CDS	
WAX 9153	Chris & Cosey	Synaesthesia	12″/CSS/CDS	
WAX 9160	KMFDM / My Life With The Thrill Kill Kult	Naïve / The Days Of Swine + Roses	12″/CSS/CDS	
WAX 9164	Greater Than One	Index	12″/CSS/CDS	
WAX 9173	Braindead Soundmachine	Walking After Midnight	12″/CDS	
WAX 9178	KMFDM	Vogue/Sex On The Flag	12″/CDS	1992
WAX 9186	Sister Machine Gun	Not My God	12"/CDS	
	Black Box - Wax Trax! Records: The First 13 Years	Various Artists		1994

Wax Trax/TVT Records (1993-2000)

No.	Artist	Title	Format
TVT 7198	Psykosonik	Psykosonik	CS/CD
TVT 7199	KMFDM	Nihil	LP/CS/CD
TVT 7201	Excessive Force	Gentle Death	CS/CD
TVT 7202	KMFDM	Angst	LP/CS/CD
TVT 7203	Various Artists	Artificial Intelligence	CS/CD
TVT 7204	Polygon Window	Surfing on Sine Waves	CS/CD
TVT 7205	Black Dog Productions	Bytes	CS/CD
TVT 7206	B-12	Electro-Soma	CS/CD
TVT 7207	Various Artists	Artificial Intelligence II	CS/CD
TVT 7208	F.U.S.E.	Dimension Intrusion	CS/CD
TVT 7209	Sister Machine Gun	The Torture Technique	CS/CD
TVT 7210	Autechre	Incunabula	CS/CD
TVT 7211	Various Artists	Ethno-Techno Volume 1	CS/CD
TVT 7212	Various Artists	Black Box – Wax Trax! Records: The First 13 Years	3xCD
TVT 7221	Various Artists	Black Box (A Video Retrospective) Volume 1	VHS
TVT 7222	Various Artists	Black Box (A Video Retrospective) Volume 2	VHS
TVT 7228	Various Artists	Afterburn: WaxTrax! Records '94 And Beyond	CD
TVT 7229	Sister Machine Gun	Burn	CS/CD
TVT 7244	Sister Machine Gun	Metropolis	CD
TVT 7251-2	Various Artists	Big Rock'N Beats	CD
TVT 8710	Chris Connelly & William Tucker	Songs For Swingin' Junkies	7"/CDS
TVT 8715	PTP (Programming The Psychodrill)	"Rubber Glove Seduction"	CDS

== See also ==
- Wax Trax
- List of record labels
