= Sister Machine Gun discography =

This is the discography page for the industrial band Sister Machine Gun. Founder and frontman Chris Randall first signed with Wax Trax! Records after passing a demo to Sascha Konietzko of KMFDM, which he supported as a roadie. After releasing Sister Machine Gun's first four albums with the label in the 1990s, Randall released the band's subsequent albums on his own label, Positron! Records. Although he disbanded the project in 2007, Randall later revived Sister Machine Gun and recorded a five-song EP, The Future Unformed, in 2015.

== Albums ==
Release date	Title	Label	Ref.
1992	Sins of the Flesh	Wax Trax! Records	
1994	The Torture Technique	Wax Trax!/TVT Records	
1995	Burn	Wax Trax!/TVT Records	
1997	Metropolis	Wax Trax!/TVT Records	
1999	[R]evolution	Positron! Records	
2000	6.0	Positron! Records	
2003	Influence	Positron! Records	
2015	The Future Unformed	WTII Records	

== Singles ==
Release date	Title	Label	Notes
1992	"Not My God"	Wax Trax! Records	Single
1992	"Addiction"	Wax Trax Records	Single
1994	Wired/Lung	Wax Trax!/TVT Records	Single
1994	"Nothing"	Wax Trax!/TVT Records	Single
1995	"Hole in the Ground"	Wax Trax!/TVT Records	Promo only CD/12"
1996	Burn 3.2	Wax Trax!/TVT Records	Promo only Single
1999	[R]evolution 5.1	Positron! Records	Single
2000	Transient 5.2	Positron! Records	CD EP (originally 1000 numbered copies; unlimited re-release)
2001	6.5: the desert companion	Positron! Records	CD EP
2002	6.6: machine	Positron! Records	CD EP
2004	"To Hell with You"	Positron! Records	Single

== Compilations ==
- Afterburn: Wax Trax-94 & Beyond (1994; TVT Records) — "Nothing (Mulatto Mix)"
- Black Box - Wax Trax! Records: The First 13 Years (1994; TVT Records) — "Addiction" from Sins of the Flesh
- Mortal Kombat (soundtrack) (1995; TVT Records) — "Burn" from Burn
- Hideaway (Soundtrack) (1995; TVT Records) — "Lung (Bronchitis Mix)" from Wired/Lung
- Mortal Kombat: More Kombat (1996; TVT Records) — "Deeper Down"
- Wax Trax! Records – Summer Swindle 1996 (Promo sampler, 1996; Wax Trax!/TVT Records) — "Hole in the Ground (Martin Atkins Remix)"
- Scream (Soundtrack) (1996; TVT Records) — "Better Than Me" from Burn
- Resonance (1997; Decibel Records) — "Bust It"
- Covered In Black: An Industrial Tribute To The Kings Of High Voltage AC/DC (Cleopatra) — "TNT"
- Sonic Adventure Remix (1998; TOSHIBA-EMI Limited Japan) — "Remix of Open Your Heart <Main theme of Sonic Adventure">
- Komposi001 (2002; Positron! Records) — "Damage" and "Bang Bang (Fully Operational Mix)"
- Komposi002 (2003; Positron! Records) — "I Don't Need" and "To Hell With You (Christ Analogue Remix)"
- Komposi003 (2006; Positron! Records) — "Sink"

== Videos ==
- Black Box: Wax Trax! Records, The First 13 Years (A video Retrospective) Volume 1 (1994; TVT Records) — "Not My God" appears on the album Sins of the Flesh
- Black Box: Wax Trax! Records, The First 13 Years (A video Retrospective) Volume 2 (1994; TVT Records) — "Wired" appears on the album The Torture Technique
- SMG 6.0 Record Release Show (VCD, 2001; Positron! Records)
- SMG 6.5 Record Release Show (DVD, 2002; Positron! Records)
