= Black Box – Wax Trax! Records: The First 13 Years =

Box set by various artists
- Released: 1994
- Recorded: 1980–1993
- Genre: Industrial
- Length: 73:08 (CD 1); 74:12 (CD 2); 71:05 (CD 3)
- Label: Wax Trax!/TVT
- Producer: Various

Professional ratings
Review scores
Source	Rating
AllMusic	4.5/5 stars
Los Angeles Times	4/4 stars

Black Box – Wax Trax! Records: The First 13 Years is a box set album compiling songs released on Wax Trax! Records between 1980 and 1993. Black Box commemorates Wax Trax!'s output as an independent record label prior to its purchase by TVT Records, featuring acts including Ministry, KMFDM, Meat Beat Manifesto, Coil, and Laibach.

Black Box is notable for containing the Trent Reznor Vocal Version of 1000 Homo DJs' "Supernaut". Reznor's vocal recording was not used on the original Wax Trax! release because of pressure from his then-current record label.

A numbered limited edition run of 10,000 of this box set was also released. The packaging was an electroplated galvanized steel box, enclosed in a black nylon mesh that was tied off at each end by heavy gauge metal wire. A card that had information about the release, including the limited edition numbering, was attached to the packaging via a wire tie. The top lid was stamped with the "Black Box" logo. Inside the packaging were the following items (stacked from top to bottom in this order): a single sided poster, the information booklet (the same that was included in the regular release), disc 1, a coaster with the "Black Box" logo on it, disc 2, a "Black Box" patch, disc 3, and a postcard you could mail in for a free catalogue from Wax Trax! / TVT. All of this sat on a bedding of "69 feet of audio tape outtakes". Each of the three CDs came in their own opaque black jewel case that had no printing on it.

A pair of companion VHS tapes were released in conjunction with the CD release.

== Track listing ==
=== Disc one ===
1. "Supernaut (Trent Reznor Vocal Version)" – 1000 Homo DJs
2. "No Devotion" – Revolting Cocks
3. "Beers, Steers and Queers (12" Version)" – Revolting Cocks
4. "Addiction" – Sister Machine Gun
5. "Violent Peace" – Excessive Force
6. "Envoyé (12" Version)" – The Young Gods
7. "I Will Refuse (12" Version)" – Pailhead
8. "Faster Than Light" – Lead into Gold
9. "Digital Tension Dementia" – Front Line Assembly
10. "Your God Is Dead" – Mussolini Headkick
11. "Now Is the Time" – Greater Than One
12. "Shit for Brains" – PIG
13. "Cop Out" – Peter Hope and Richard H. Kirk
14. "Atomic Dog" – Wreck
15. "Elephant's Graveyard (12" Version)" – Strike Under

=== Disc two ===
1. "Stowaway" – Chris Connelly
2. "Come Down Here" – Chris Connelly
3. "Love's Secret Domain" – Coil
4. "The Snow (Answers Come In Dreams II Version)" – Coil
5. "The Hacker" – Clock DVA
6. "Virus (12" Version)" – KMFDM
7. "Godlike (12" Version)" – KMFDM
8. "Every Day (Is Halloween) (Original 12" Version)" – Ministry
9. "Rigor Mortis" – A Split-Second
10. "Butterfly Potion (12" Version)" – Foetus
11. "Father Don't Cry" – Doubting Thomas
12. "Nothing Stays" – Cyberaktif
13. "Words (Of The Dying)" – Controlled Bleeding
14. "Compulsion" – In The Nursery

=== Disc three ===
1. "Rubber Glove Seduction (12" Version)" – PTP
2. "No Name, No Slogan (12" Version)" – Acid Horse
3. "What Time Is Love? (12" Version)" – The KLF
4. "Silicon Jesus (Duality Mix)" – Psykosonik
5. "Cuz It's Hot (12" Version)" – My Life with the Thrill Kill Kult
6. "Do You Fear (for Your Child)" – My Life with the Thrill Kill Kult
7. "Geburt Einer Nation" – Laibach
8. "God O.D." – Meat Beat Manifesto
9. "Mindblower" – Fred
10. "I.C. Water" – Psychic TV
11. "Me and My Ding Dong" – Pankow
12. "The Name Game (7" Version)" – Divine
