= Chicago record labels =

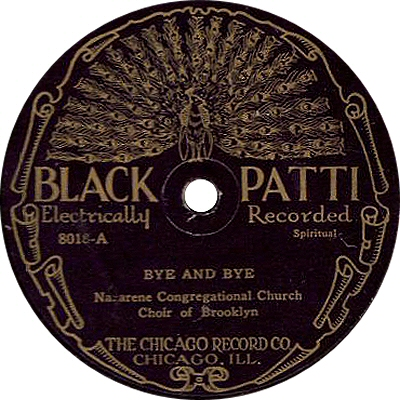
"Bye and Bye" recorded in 1927 on the Black Patti Records label of The Chicago Record Company

Chicago has supported independent record publishing since the 1920s, with local labels associated with blues, jazz, soul, folk, house, classical, dance, and electronic music. This list includes active and defunct record labels founded in Chicago or later based in the city. Inclusion requires independent reliable sourcing that establishes a label's Chicago connection.

Name	Founder	Founded	Genres	Artists
Alligator Records	Bruce Iglauer	1971	Blues, roots, folk	Koko Taylor, Lonnie Brooks, Luther Allison, Albert Collins, Hound Dog Taylor, Johnny Winter, Shemekia Copeland, Marcia Ball
Autograph Records		1924		
Black Patti Records	J. Mayo Williams	1927	African American jazz, blues, sermons, spirituals, and skits	
Bloodshot Records	Nan Warshaw & Rob Miller	1994	Indie rock with roots inflections	Lydia Loveless, Justin Townes Earle, Wayne Hancock, Scott H. Biram, Bottle Rockets, Deadstring Brothers, Ha Ha Tonka, Jon Langford, Dex Romweber Duo, Andre Williams, Cory Branan, Barrence Whitfield & The Savages, Robbie Fulks, Bobby Bare Jr., Luke Winslow King, Murder By Death, JC Brooks & The Uptown Sound, Waco Brothers
Cedille Records	James Ginsburg	1989	Classical	
Chance Records		1950		
Chess Records	Leonard & Phil Chess	1950	Blues, jazz, doo-wop, gospel, soul, rock and roll, comedy	See List of Chess Records artists
Curtom Records	Curtis Mayfield	1968	Soul	
Delmark Records	Bob Koester	1953	Blues, jazz, doo-wop, gospel	
DJ International Records	Rocky Jones and Benji Espinoza	1985	House	
Drag City	Dan Koretzky & Dan Osborn	1989	Experimental, folk	Joanna Newsom, Pavement, Will Oldham (Bonnie 'Prince' Billy), Papa M, Jim O'Rourke, Silver Jews, Smog, Royal Trux, Chestnut Station, Mantis, Palace, Plush, Edith Frost, Azita
Dunwich Records			Psychedelic rock	
Earwig Music Company	Michael Frank	1978	Blues, roots, storytelling, jazz	David Honeyboy Edwards, The Jelly Roll Kings, Big Jack Johnson, Louisiana Red, Sunnyland Slim, Jimmy Dawkins, Frank Frost, Homesick James, John Primer
Flying Fish Records	Bruce Kaplan	1974	Folk, blues, bluegrass, country	
Grrr Records	Glenn Kaiser and Tom Cameron	1987	Christian rock, punk, blues	Glenn Kaiser, Rez Band, Darrell Mansfield, The Crossing
HOMHOMHOM	Maxwell Citron	2012	Experimental, rock, pop	Blue Cloud, Hannah Mayree, Aleph Eris, New Crimes, Lords of Beacon House
HoZac Records	Todd Novak and Brett Cross	2006	Underground rock	
International Anthem Recording Company	Scottie McNiece and David Allen	2014	Jazz, experimental	
J.O.B. Records		1949		
Johann's Face Records	Marc Ruvolo & Gar Brandt		Melodic punk and pop	
Kranky	Bruce Adams & Joel Leoschke	1993	Experimental, Ambient, Electronic, Psychedelic, Alternative Rock	Labradford, Belong, Grouper, Tim Hecker, Chihei Hatakeyama, Loscil, Pan•American
Lengua Armada Discos	Martin Sorrondeguy		Hardcore	Los Crudos, Limp Wrist, Charles Bronson, Severed Head of State, MK-Ultra
Mercury Records				
Minty Fresh			Upbeat and poppy	Kahimi Karie
Mutant League Records	Nate Steinheimer	2012	Punk, hardcore, indie	
The Numero Group	Rob Sevier & Ken Shipley	2003	Reissues, Catalog, Boxsets, Soul, Funk, R&B, Gospel, Blues, Indie, Punk, Hardcore, Latin, Folk, New Age, Ambient, Instrumental, Singer-Songwriter, Lounge, Exotica, Girl Group, Pop, Garage, Power Pop	
Parrot Records				
Red Scare Industries	Tobias Jeg and Brendan Kelly		Punk	
Thick Records			Punk	
Thrill Jockey Records	Bettina Richards	1992	Indie, post-rock	Tortoise, The Sea and Cake, Tom Verlaine, Califone, Fiery Furnaces, Archer Prewitt, Eleventh Dream Day
Touch & Go	Founded by Tesco Vee & Dave Stimson; Owned by Corey Rusk	1981	Punk, hardcore, indie	Ted Leo + Pharmacists, TV On The Radio, Big Black, Don Caballero, Rollins Band, The Jesus Lizard, Slint, Yeah Yeah Yeahs, !!!, Shellac, Pinback, Blonde Redhead
Trax Records	Larry Sherman, with Vince Lawrence and Jesse Saunders also credited in some accounts	1984	House	Adonis, Marshall Jefferson, Mr. Lee, Mr. Fingers, Farley "Jackmaster" Funk, Phuture, Frankie Knuckles, Lidell Townsell, Jamie Principle
Underground Communique Records	Justin Schwier	2004	Punk, hardcore, indie	Shot Baker, Big D and the Kids Table, The Copyrights, Hellmouth, The Heat Tape, The Methadones, Reel Big Fish, Mustard Plug
United Records		1952		
USA Records	Founded by Jim Golden, owned by Paul Glass	1960	Blues, pop, R&B, garage band, Sound of Chicago horns and voice, rock, polka, comedy	Deltones, Rivieras, Willie Mabon, Junior Wells, Koko Taylor, J.B. Lenoir, Bobby Whiteside, Buckinghams
Vee-Jay Records	Vivian Carter & James C. Bracken	1953	R&B, Soul	John Lee Hooker, Memphis Slim, Jimmy Reed
Wax Trax! Records	Jim Nash and Dannie Flesher	1980	Industrial, punk, hardcore, indie	KMFDM, Ministry, Front Line Assembly, Front 242, Minimal Compact, Braindead Soundmachine, Revolting Cocks, Pailhead, My Life with the Thrill Kill Kult
WTII Records	Bart Pfanenstiel and David Schock	2001	EBM, synthpop, industrial, electronic	Acumen Nation, Beborn Beton, Blume, In Strict Confidence, Klutæ, Melotron, Sister Machine Gun
