= Side Trax =

Compilation album by Ministry
- Released: October 12, 2004
- Recorded: 1986–89
- Genre: Industrial metal
- Length: 79:42
- Label: Rykodisc
- Producer: Al Jourgensen

Ministry chronology
Early Trax (2004)	Side Trax (2004)	Rantology (2005)

Professional ratings
Review scores
Source	Rating
AllMusic	3/5 stars

Side Trax is a compilation album from industrial metal band Ministry. The album was released in October 2004. It compiles EPs from four Ministry side projects recorded in the late 1980s: Pailhead, 1000 Homo DJs, PTP, and Acid Horse. All of the songs were originally released on Wax Trax! Records, with the exception of PTP's previously unreleased "Show Me Your Spine". Notably, the rare version of 1000 Homo DJs' "Supernaut" with Trent Reznor of Nine Inch Nails on vocals is included on this compilation.

The first pressing of the album was afflicted with poor sound quality, which was caused by the simple duplication of the left channel. Later pressings corrected the mistakes. The original mono pressing has the digits A4 P2 310690-2 01 on the back, while the corrected stereo version has the digits A4 P2 310690-2 RE-1 01. It is also confirmed that albums ordered directly from Ryko are the corrected pressing.

== Track listing ==
=== Pailhead ===
No.	Title	Length
1.	"Man Should Surrender"	3:40
2.	"Anthem"	4:45
3.	"Don't Stand in Line"	3:47
4.	"Ballad"	3:53
5.	"I Will Refuse"	4:17
6.	"No Bunny"	5:00

=== 1000 Homo DJs ===
No.	Title	Length
7.	"Apathy"	4:34
8.	"Better Ways"	5:23
9.	"Supernaut"	6:35
10.	"Hey Asshole"	8:06

=== PTP ===
No.	Title	Length
11.	"Rubber Glove Seduction"	5:24
12.	"Favorite Things"	4:29
13.	"Show Me Your Spine"	4:57

=== Acid Horse ===
No.	Title	Length
14.	"No Name No Slogan" (Hypo Luxa/Hermes Pan Mix)	5:54
15.	"No Name No Slogan" (Cabaret Voltaire Mix)	9:04
