= Political opportunism =

Practice of taking advantage of every situation to maintain political influence

Political opportunism refers to the practice of taking advantage of every situation to maintain political support or influence, often disregarding relevant ethical or political principles.

== The role of principles ==
Political opportunism is often criticized for prioritizing expediency over principles. Whether in the pursuit of immediate gains or through compromise, principles serve as the benchmark for distinguishing legitimate behavior from opportunism.

=== Short-termism ===
Opportunistic political behavior is frequently criticized as shortsighted or narrow-minded. The drive to secure or maintain political gains can lead to decisions that prioritize pragmatism at the expense of principles. Such actions often provoke public disillusionment and calls for a return to core values.

Ambiguity in political situations frequently provides fertile ground for opportunism. When circumstances lack precedent or consensus, it can be difficult to determine whether an action is adaptive or opportunistic. Politicians may defend such decisions as necessary or aligned with broader goals, even as critics label them opportunistic. Milton Friedman highlighted this tension by remarking, "One man's opportunism is another man's statesmanship".

In some cases, political figures defer judgment of their controversial decisions by claiming that "history will prove me right." This argument has been used to justify actions ranging from significant policy shifts to military interventions.

=== Opportunism vs. compromise ===
Compromise is a cornerstone of politics, yet it must be managed to ensure it does not undermine principles. John F. Kennedy emphasized this balance, stating: "We can resolve the clash of interests without conceding our ideals… Compromise need not mean cowardice."

However, compromises that dilute or abandon principles risk being labeled opportunistic. For instance, some political leaders have been accused of shifting their positions drastically for the sake of expediency, leading to accusations of opportunism rather than pragmatism.

Rigid adherence to principles can lead to sectarianism or factionalism, while excessive flexibility risks undermining their role as meaningful guides to action. Political compromises must strike a balance between adapting to changing circumstances and upholding ethical boundaries.

The interpretation of principles often sparks disputes. The same action may be justified using different principles, or interpretations may vary about how a principle should be applied. Consistent adherence to principles helps distinguish legitimate compromises from opportunistic behavior and fosters trust in political decision-making.

== Assessment ==
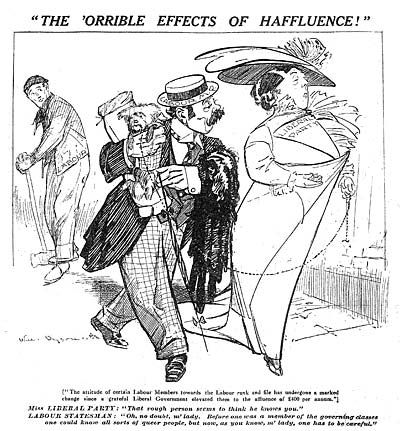
Caricature chastising the Labour Party for how they changed once they began getting some power in the British Government… Miss LIBERAL PARTY: "That rough person seems to think he knows you." LABOUR STATESMAN "Oh, no doubt, m'lady, before one was a member of the governing classes one could know all sorts of queer people, but now, as you know, one has to be careful."

Political integrity involves maintaining a balance between principled positions and the flexibility needed to respond to changing circumstances. Leaders are expected to navigate complex situations while staying true to their ethical commitments. This balance defines effective leadership, as it allows decisions to be guided by values rather than opportunism.

However, this balance can be difficult to maintain in practice. Saul Alinsky, in Rules for Radicals, observed that political organizations often act on contradictory motives, where decisions intended to serve the common good may also be influenced by self-interest. He suggested that laws are often written with lofty goals in mind but are implemented in ways that reflect underlying greed or practical considerations. This tension between ideals and pragmatism highlights the challenges of maintaining transparency in politics. When politicians withhold key information for strategic reasons, public trust may erode as citizens speculate about hidden motives.

The claim that "there is no such thing as an honest politician" underscores the difficulty of fully disclosing the complexities of decision-making. Politicians often provide partial truths to advance specific goals, which may create skepticism about their intentions. Nonetheless, entering politics does not necessarily preclude acting with integrity. Many leaders begin their careers with the intent to serve the public good but face pressures that force them to compromise or adapt. Over time, the role of political office may shift from being a means to achieve higher goals to an end in itself, shaping their decisions around maintaining power rather than advancing ideals.

As John Keegan observed, the greater threat to political integrity often lies not with the leaders themselves but with those around them who exploit political systems for personal gain. These individuals may undermine trust by creating factions, manipulating processes, or prioritizing their own interests above the common good. Assessing whether an action is opportunistic depends on understanding the context and motivations behind it. Actions aligned with ethical principles and showing consistency between means and ends are typically seen as legitimate. In contrast, actions motivated primarily by personal or factional interests are more likely to be judged as opportunistic. However, these judgments are subjective and can be shaped by political biases, emotional reactions, or limited information.

Ultimately, balancing principles and pragmatism is essential for maintaining public trust. While political leaders must adapt to changing circumstances, adherence to consistent ethical commitments reassures the public that decisions are being made for the common good rather than for short-term political gain.

== Drawbacks ==
Political opportunism disrupts coherent strategies by prioritizing short-term gains over principled action. Tactics such as exploiting crises for electoral advantage, shifting positions to suit public sentiment, or distorting facts obscure long-term goals. This creates confusion about which strategies are effective, blurs the distinction between success and failure, and leads to the repetition of past mistakes. For instance, research on political opportunism during economic crises reveals that leaders often delay necessary but unpopular measures to secure voter approval, causing long-term harm to economic stability.

Moreover, opportunism erodes public trust. As leaders abandon consistency or manipulate information to suit immediate needs, voters grow cynical, perceiving decisions as arbitrary or self-serving rather than accountable. These behaviors also deepen societal divisions, with polarizing rhetoric and disinformation used to manipulate perceptions and maintain power. While effective in the short term, such tactics undermine social cohesion and stall progress on critical challenges like climate change and economic inequality.

Ultimately, reliance on opportunistic tactics reduces politics to reactive pragmatism, focused on preserving the status quo rather than addressing systemic issues or advancing collective goals. This not only stifles innovation but also weakens the ability to mobilize public support for meaningful change.
