= The Torture Technique =

Studio album by Sister Machine Gun
- Released: March 15, 1994
- Studio: Various: Chicago Trax Recording Studio; (Chicago, IL); Warzone Recorders; (Chicago, IL)
- Genre: Industrial rock
- Length: 50:22
- Label: TVT/Wax Trax!
- Producer: Van Christie, Jim Marcus, Chris Randall

Sister Machine Gun chronology
| Sins of the Flesh (1992) | The Torture Technique (1994) | Burn (1995) |

The Torture Technique is the second studio album by Sister Machine Gun, released on March 15, 1994 by TVT and Wax Trax! Records. The album spent eight weeks on the CMJ Radio Top 150 peaking at No. 46, and nine weeks on the CMJ RPM Charts peaking at No. 10.

== Reception ==
Professional ratings
Review scores
| Source | Rating |
|---|---|
| AllMusic | 1.5/5 stars |

Vincent Jeffries of allmusic gave The Torture Technique a one and a half out of five stars, saying "to Chris Randall's credit, he expands his programming skills ("Salvation," "Brother Bomb") and vocal performances ("Cocaine Jesus") enough to mimic industrial rock success stories Ministry and White Zombie, instead of exclusively copying Nine Inch Nails." He concluded by saying, "The Torture Technique isn't as dry or repetitive as Sister Machine Gun's first release, but Randall's marginal improvements aren't enough to warrant a recommendation." Aiding & Abetting praised the very stripped down sound of the album, saying it's "experimental enough to get me hard, bouncy enough to make me dance, Sister Machine Gun is rather good." Option gave the album a favorable review saying it "...enthusiastically embraces industrial dance styles without being limited by them..."

== Track listing ==
All lyrics are written by Chris Randall, except "Wired" and "Iron Sun" by Jim Marcus; all music is composed by Van Christie, Tom Gaul, Jim Marcus and Chris Randall.

| No. | Title | Length |
|---|---|---|
| 1. | "Salvation" | 6:11 |
| 2. | "Sacrifice" | 3:46 |
| 3. | "Negative" | 4:26 |
| 4. | "Krackhead" | 4:29 |
| 5. | "Wired" | 3:02 |
| 6. | "Cocaine Jesus" | 5:32 |
| 7. | "Brother Bomb" | 3:27 |
| 8. | "Nothing" | 4:36 |
| 9. | "Torture Technique" | 3:28 |
| 10. | "Iron Sun" | 5:46 |
| 11. | "Heaven" | 5:37 |

== Personnel ==
Adapted from the liner notes of The Torture Technique.

Sister Machine Gun

- Tom Gaul – guitar
- Chris Kelly – keyboards, backing vocals
- Chris Randall – lead vocals, keyboards, programming, production, mixing
- Steve Stoll – drums

Additional performers

- En Esch – drums, guitar
- Derek Frigo – guitar
- Charles Levi – bass guitar, guitar
- Jim Marcus – programming, additional vocals, editing, production, recording, mixing
- James Woolley – keyboards, editing

Production and design

- Van Christie – production, recording, mixing
- Noli Eckerson – assistant recording
- Bill Garcelon – assistant recording
- Dave Kovach – assistant recording
- Steve Levy – assistant recording
- Jason McNinch – assistant recording
- Matt Warren – assistant recording

== Release history ==
| Region | Date | Label | Format | Catalog |
|---|---|---|---|---|
| United States | 1994 | TVT/Wax Trax! | CD, CS | TVT 7209 |
| Japan | 1994 | Polystar | CD | PSCW-5067 |
