= The Living End (film) =

1992 film by Gregg Araki

- Theatrical release poster
- Directed by: Gregg Araki
- Written by: Gregg Araki
- Produced by: Marcus Hu; Jon Gerrans
- Starring: Craig Gilmore; Mike Dytri
- Cinematography: Gregg Araki
- Edited by: Gregg Araki
- Music by: Cole Coonce
- Production companies: Desperate Pictures; Strand Releasing
- Distributed by: October Films
- Release dates: January 23, 1992 (Sundance); August 14, 1992 (United States)
- Running time: 84 minutes
- Country: United States
- Language: English
- Budget: $22,769
- Box office: $692,585

The Living End is a 1992 American road comedy-drama film written and directed by Gregg Araki. It stars Craig Gilmore and Mike Dytri as two HIV-positive young gay men who meet by chance and embark on a road trip after one of them kills a police officer. Described by some critics as a "gay Thelma & Louise", the film is an early entry in the New Queer Cinema genre. The Living End was nominated for the Grand Jury Prize Dramatic at the 1992 Sundance Film Festival.

== Plot ==
In Los Angeles, Jon, a withdrawn and depressed young film critic, is diagnosed with HIV. Meanwhile, reckless drifter Luke hitches a ride with a pair of lesbians, Fern and Daisy, who pull a gun on him. When the pair stops to use the bathroom, Luke steals their car and drives away, but due to a punctured tire, he resumes hitchhiking. That night, a man named Ken picks up Luke and takes him home, where they have sex. Ken's wife Barbie catches them in bed together and stabs Ken to death, prompting Luke to flee.

Luke is accosted by three gay bashers with baseball bats. After shooting them with the gun he stole from the lesbians, Luke desperately flags down a passing motorist, who happens to be Jon. Jon reluctantly invites Luke to stay the night, and as Luke flirts with Jon, they discover they are both HIV-positive and eventually have sex. The next morning, Luke shares his belief that since they are both infected, they have nothing to lose and can do whatever they want. The two go shopping using a credit card Luke stole from Ken. When a neo-Nazi hurls homophobic slurs at them on the street, Luke angrily kills him with a large portable cassette player.

Unnerved by Luke's violent temper, Jon throws him out of the house, though he confides in his best friend Darcy that he cannot stop thinking about Luke. One night, Jon awakens to find a bloodied Luke in his bedroom, threatening to shoot himself. Distraught, Luke confesses he may have killed a police officer and urges Jon to leave town with him. Jon agrees to drive Luke to Northern California, where Luke says he has a friend. They arrive in San Francisco in the morning, but Luke's friend shuts the door in his face without saying a word, so they continue to look for a place to stay. Jon calls Darcy from a payphone, telling her he has gone on a road trip with Luke and asking her to house-sit for him.

Luke and Jon continue their trip, using the stolen credit card to pay for motel rooms. While they are driving one day, Luke nearly shoots a police officer after Jon receives a parking ticket. Enraged, Jon proclaims he wishes he had never met Luke, who convinces Jon that they should make the most of the time they have left. As they drive on, Luke shares his desire to die while having sex, asking Jon to be the one who kills him. Jon soon falls ill and begins to cough. After Luke unsuccessfully attempts to use the credit card to withdraw cash from an ATM, he robs the bank at gunpoint and they drive off. Shaken by the experience, Jon calls to tell Darcy he is coming home.

Jon tells Luke that their "romantic fantasy" has come to an end, as he intends to return to Los Angeles. Holding his gun to Jon's head, Luke declares that Jon will never find anyone who cares about him as much as he does. After they struggle for the gun, Luke pistol-whips Jon into unconsciousness. Later, as Jon awakens on a beach with his hands tied behind his back, Luke rapes him while holding the gun to his own mouth. When Luke pulls the trigger, the gun is empty. Luke throws the gun away and unties Jon, who punches Luke and leaves, but returns shortly afterwards and leans on Luke's shoulder as the sun sets.

== Cast ==
- Craig Gilmore as Jon
- Mike Dytri as Luke
- Mark Finch as The Doctor
- Mary Woronov as Daisy
- Johanna Went as Fern
- Darcy Marta as Darcy
- Scot Goetz as Peter
- Bretton Vail as Ken
- Nicole Dillenberg as Barbie
- Stephen Holman and Magie Song as The 7-Eleven Couple
- Christopher Mabli as the Melrose Neo-Nazi

== Music ==
The film's soundtrack consists mostly of industrial, post-punk, and shoegaze music. Many references to bands and their members are made throughout the film. Joy Division's Ian Curtis is mentioned, along with Dead Can Dance, Echo & the Bunnymen and others. A Nine Inch Nails sticker is on the dashboard of Jon's car. The film's title comes from a song by the Jesus and Mary Chain from their debut studio album. Psychocandy (1985), and a cover version of the song is performed by Wax Trax! Records artists Braindead Soundmachine during the film's credits. Early in the film, Luke is seen wearing a Jesus and Mary Chain shirt.

The film features music by the industrial bands Coil, Chris & Cosey, Psychic TV, Fred Giannelli, KMFDM, and Braindead Soundmachine. Braindead Soundmachine guitarist Cole Coonce is credited with scoring the film's original music.

== Themes ==
=== Death ===
Released amidst the AIDS epidemic of the 1980s and 1990s, the film positions itself within the public discourses circulating at this time in the United States of America that being HIV-positive is being sentenced to death. Robert Mills states that the movie release in 1992 was also "the year that AIDS officially became the number one cause of death for US men aged 25-44." Considering this context, death is portrayed in different ways throughout the movie and represents what gay men felt. These same people were "harshly blamed for the spread of the virus. At the same time, the institutions of the society were negligent of the thousands of people who were dying of the disease."

For Jon's character, his recent diagnosis of HIV comes as a shock, and is accompanied by his fear and denial. Meeting Luke's character, the weight that Jon's news holds for him can be seen as he struggles to find the words to tell Luke that he is HIV-positive. Luke's character receives this uneasiness by reassuring Jon that he knows what was going to be disclosed and that it is "no big deal". Luke even goes to say "welcome to the club" revealing that he is also HIV-positive. For Luke's character, he has come to terms with his HIV health status and adopts his reckless behaviour accordingly. Seeing death through Luke's eyes, he holds a greater importance for living in the moment, love, and sex. Luke brings a sense of freedom to this pair's shared newfound health status which is seen through the "provocative images of bareback gay sex, blowjobs behind the steering wheel, S&M, and related phenomena not frequently seen up to that point in U.S cinema."

Death is a looming theme throughout the movie and the plot naturally unfolds because of it. Whether it be Jon and Luke's relationship in their shared death from AIDS or Luke's assaults and murders which are continuously followed by the duo driving away in their car to escape the consequences. Even at the climax of the movie, it is understood and seen that death is waiting for them yet the movie ends with them escaping from it once again.

=== Nihilism ===
B. Ruby Rich describes the main characters as "one bored and one full of rage, both of them with nothing to lose." The despair felt in the face of death from AIDS coincides with the nihilistic ideas brought on by Luke. The mottos and graffities shared throughout the movie illustrate his thoughts of "fuck the world", "I blame society", "fuck the system", "fuck the police" and "fuck everything". Without a doubt, these messages all come in response to the movie's production in the United States political context where gay men were being bashed and shamed for starting the AIDS epidemic. Jon, Luke, and the queer community at large, already faced discrimination for their sexual orientation, but now, also for their HIV-positive health status.

Luke's hedonism progressively becomes adopted by Jon through their relationship and understanding of each other's situation. By means of their car, they "aren’t distracted by preachy morality, but are guided by a carpe diem philosophy in their nihilistic situation where they wield guns, extinguish their enemies, hit the road, and have unsafe sex." The movie makes use of scenes with humour and joy demonstrating that there can still be life despite the presumed death from AIDS. For Michael D. Klemm, "most of the love scenes between Jon and Luke are as tender as they are steamy (and they were the most explicit male love scenes I'd ever seen at that point) and their love story is often quite touching." This film makes its mark in New Queer Cinema as it expands the representations of gay men to go beyond the first decade of the AIDS epidemic. A time when television and the media "consistently pathologized and demonized gay men as 'AIDS killers.'"

=== Violence ===
"Cinematic violence, for Araki, is used to combat the widespread labelling of people with AIDS as parasitic victims, an association that was 'emphatically rejected' by both support groups and political activists throughout the epidemic." Luke's character channels the built-up anger and frustration of queer communities who were victimized and villainized by the same American government that ostracized them and disregarded the illness. There is even explicit mention of violence against politics and for activism. Luke suggests going to Washington and shooting Bush in the head or "better yet hold him at gunpoint and inject him with our blood". This scene speaks to the impending death by AIDS that both gay male characters live with and brings the injustice that there would be research for a cure or aid if the president himself had HIV. It also can serve as a comparison that the death which they face is worse than a gunshot because it is slow and painful, both psychologically and physically, whereas death by a gunshot is often quick and fatal.

The use of a gun by Luke is seen in almost every violent scene in the movie. At once, he uses it as a way to become powerful against authority figures and assault homophobic police and gay-bashers. Moreover, the gun can symbolize the epidemic of AIDS as not being exclusively associated to gay men. In fact, Gregg Araki brings this idea as he "makes use of a specific form of disembodied, withdrawn violence in order to disassociate this act from the connotations of contagion attached to queer bodies throughout popular historical discourse." In one scene, Araki's conscious choice of cinematography and focus on the men being shot by Luke's gun even works to "emphasize the source of violence as being external to the body of the person with AIDS." In short, The Living End's representations of violence seek to deconstruct the preconceived ideas that AIDS, its epidemic, and death tolls, are uniquely linked to gay men.

== Reception ==
On the review aggregator website Rotten Tomatoes, 75% of 12 critics' reviews are positive, with an average rating of 6.8/10. Metacritic, which uses a weighted average, assigned the film a score of 65 out of 100, based on 15 critics, indicating "generally favorable" reviews.

Janet Maslin of The New York Times found The Living End to be "a candid, freewheeling road movie" with "the power of honesty and originality, as well as the weight of legitimate frustration. Miraculously, it also has a buoyant, mischievous spirit that transcends any hint of gloom." She praised Araki for his solid grasp on his lead characters' plight and for not trivializing it or inventing an easy ending. Conversely, Rita Kempley for The Washington Post called the film pretentious and Araki a "cinematic poseur" along the lines of Jean-Luc Godard and Andy Warhol. The Living End, she concluded, "is mostly annoying". Rolling Stone's Peter Travers found The Living End a "savagely funny, sexy and grieving cry" made more heart-rending by "Hollywood's gutless fear of AIDS movies". The Star Observer praised the movie, calling it "a vicious punch in the guts that leaves you uncomfortably winded and unforgettably moved".

In a letter (dated September 25, 1992) to playwright Robert Patrick, LGBT writer and actor Quentin Crisp called the film "dreadful."
