= Chicago blues =

Form of blues music indigenous to Chicago, Illinois

- Stylistic origins: Delta blues; electric blues
- Cultural origins: 20th century, Chicago, U.S.

Chicago blues is a form of blues music that developed in Chicago, Illinois. It is based on earlier blues idioms, such as Delta blues, but is performed in an urban style. It developed alongside the Great Migration of African Americans of the first half of the twentieth century. Key features that distinguish Chicago blues from the earlier traditions, such as Delta blues, are the prominent use of electrified instruments (especially the electric guitar), and the use of electronic effects, such as distortion and overdrive.

Muddy Waters, often acknowledged as the "father" of Chicago blues, was a colleague of Delta blues musicians Son House and Robert Johnson. He migrated to Chicago in 1943, joining the established Big Bill Broonzy, where they developed a distinct style of the Chicago blues, which hit its peak around the late 1940s and early 1950s. Joined by artists such as Willie Dixon, Howlin' Wolf, and John Lee Hooker, Chicago blues reached an international audience by the late 1950s and early 1960s, directly influencing not only the development of early rock and roll musicians such as Chuck Berry and Bo Diddley, but also reaching across the Atlantic to influence both British blues and early hard rock acts such as Eric Clapton, the Rolling Stones, and Led Zeppelin. Prominent record labels such as Vee-Jay Records and Chess Records helped promote and spread the style. The Chicago Blues Festival has been held annually since 1984, on the anniversary of Muddy Waters' death, as a means of preserving and promoting Chicago blues.

== History ==
=== Origins and Influences ===
Chicago blues evolved from rural Delta blues following the Great Migration, or the Great Northern Drive, which was both forced and voluntary at times, of African Americans from the southern U.S. to the industrial cities of the north, such as Chicago. Big Bill Broonzy and Muddy Waters directly joined that migration, like many others, escaping the harsher southern Jim Crow laws and in search of better jobs and a more promising life in the North. Bruce Iglauer, founder of Alligator Records stated that, "Chicago blues is the music of the industrial city, and has an industrial sense about it." Additionally, recognizing the shift in blues, Chicago blues singer and guitarist Kevin Moore expressed the blues transition stating, "You have to put some new life into it, new blood, new perspectives. You can't keep talking about mules, workin' on the levee." Chicago blues was heavily influenced by Mississippi bluesmen who traveled to Chicago in the early 1940s. Moving from the rural, agrarian South to the urban, industrial North, the country style of Delta blues was no longer suited to the metropolitan culture of Chicago or the modern, working-class African American audiences. Thus, the formation of a new sound in the Chicago blues was a direct product of the Great Migration.

=== Characteristics and Sound ===
Chicago blues is based on the sound of the solid-body electric guitar and the harmonica, with the harmonica played through a PA system or guitar amplifier, both loudly amplified, often to the point of distortion, and a heavy rhythm section of drums and bass (double bass at first, and later electric bass guitar) with piano depending on the song or performer. The Delta blues was traditionally played in quiet, close-knit settings, either solo or with just one or two other musicians. However, when the music moved to Chicago, these musicians had to adapt to stay relevant. Whether performing in noisy, crowded nightclubs or on bustling street corners, Chicago blues players had to adopt a more aggressive tone, switching from acoustic to electric instruments in order to be heard at these loud venues. Additionally, these performances now included drums, bass, guitars, and vocalists playing as a cohesive ensemble. With this larger, more coordinated band came the need for a standardized structure, leading to the widespread adoption of the standard 12-bar blues progression in Chicago blues.

=== Development in Chicago ===
Urban blues started in Chicago and St. Louis, as music created by part-time musicians playing as street musicians, at rent parties, and other events in the black community. For example, bottleneck guitarist Kokomo Arnold was a steelworker and had a moonshine business that was far more profitable than his music.

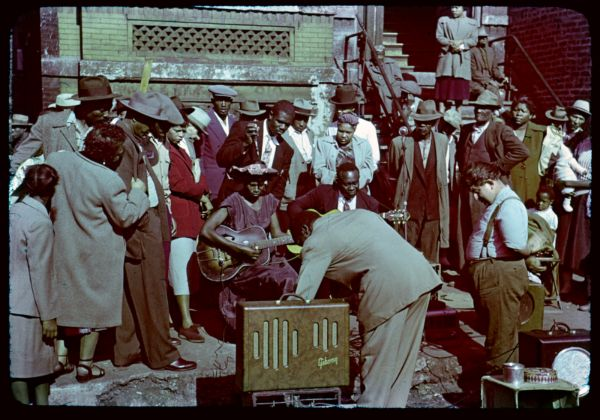
Maxwell Street blues performers and onlookers circa 1950

An early incubator for Chicago blues was the open-air market on Maxwell Street, one of the largest open-air markets in the nation. Residents of the black community would frequent it to buy and sell just about anything. It was a natural location for blues musicians to perform, earn tips, and jam with other musicians. The standard path for blues musicians was to start out as street musicians and at house parties and eventually make their way to blues clubs. The first blues clubs in Chicago were mostly in predominantly black neighborhoods on the South Side, with a few in the smaller black neighborhoods on the West Side. New trends in technology, chaotic streets and bars adding drums to an electric mix, gave birth to a new club culture. One of the most famous was Ruby Lee Gatewood's Tavern, known by patrons as "The Gates". During the 1930s virtually every big-name artist played there.

Born largely out of the rough environment of Chicago's Black ghettos, the energetic, hard-edged sound of the electric Chicago blues both emerged from and mirrors the conditions in which it developed. As a result, listeners outside this setting often reacted to Chicago blues with confusion or even opposition. Shaped by its environment, the style and performance of the Chicago blues also varied across different parts of the city. Musicians on the West Side developed a smoother style with stronger jazz influences, while those on the South Side tended to play with a rawer, more aggressive tone.

What drove the blues to international influence was the promotion of record companies such as Paramount Records, RCA Victor, and Columbia Records. Through such record companies Chicago blues became a commercial enterprise. The new style of music eventually reached Europe and the United Kingdom. In the 1960s, young British musicians were highly influenced by Chicago blues resulting in the British blues movement.

According to Christgau's Record Guide: Rock Albums of the Seventies (1981), Chicago blues saw its best documentation during the 1970s thanks in part to Alligator Records and its owner Bruce Iglauer, described by Robert Christgau as a "folkie Leonard Chess".

== Influence ==
Chicago blues was one of the most significant influences on early rock and metal music. Chuck Berry originally signed with Chess Records—one of the most significant Chicago blues record labels. Berry met and was influenced by Muddy Waters in Chicago and Waters suggested he audition for Chess. Willie Dixon and other blues musicians played on some of Berry's early records. In the UK in the early 1960s, beat groups, such as the Yardbirds and the Animals (dubbed the British Invasion in the US), were heavily influenced by Chicago blues artists. The last two served as backing musicians for Sonny Boy Williamson II and made their first recordings with him when he toured England in 1963 and 1964. Some British groups regularly performed Chicago blues songs, including Howlin' Wolf's "Smokestack Lightning," which was a staple in their live sets. Moreover, both the Rolling Stones and Rolling Stone Magazine took their names from one of Muddy Waters's most popular songs, "Rollin' Stone," which he released in 1950. American artists, such as the Paul Butterfield Blues Band (who included two members of Howlin' Wolf's band), John P. Hammond, and Charlie Musselwhite performed in the style of Chicago blues. Later, Cream, Rory Gallagher, and the Allman Brothers Band also pursued their own interpretations of Chicago blues songs and helped popularize blues rock.

== See also ==
- List of Chicago blues musicians
- Chicago record labels
- Music of Chicago
