= Sins of the Flesh =

Studio album by Sister Machine Gun
- Released: December 29, 1992
- Studio: Various: ARS Studios; (Homewood, IL)); Chicago Trax Recording Studio; (Chicago, IL)
- Genre: Industrial rock
- Length: 39:53
- Label: Wax Trax!
- Producer: Sascha Konietzko, Chris Randall

Sister Machine Gun chronology
Sins of the Flesh (1992)	The Torture Technique (1994)

Sins of the Flesh is the debut studio album of Sister Machine Gun, released on December 29, 1992, by Wax Trax! Records. It was produced with the aide of KMFDM composer and musician Sascha Konietzko.

== Reception ==
Professional ratings
Review scores
Source	Rating
AllMusic	1.5/5 stars

Vincent Jeffries of AllMusic gave the album a one and a half out of five stars, comparing Sins of the Flesh unfavorably to Nine Inch Nails and saying "Sister Machine Gun display neither the vibrant programming nor the skilled songwriting needed to pull off great industrial for the masses."

== Track listing ==
All tracks are written by Chris Randall, except "Degenerate" co-written with Steve Stoll and "X-Rated Movie" by Milan Williams.

No.	Title	Length
1.	"Sins of the Flesh"	5:06
2.	"Why Not"	5:00
3.	"Degenerate"	3:35
4.	"X-Rated Movie" (Commodores cover)	4:12
5.	"Don't Let Me Down"	3:33
6.	"Not My God"	5:13
7.	"Night Returning"	4:28
8.	"Life"	4:28
9.	"Addiction"	4:16

== Personnel ==
Adapted from the Sins of the Flesh liner notes.

Sister Machine Gun

- Tom Gaul – guitar
- Chris Randall – lead vocals, keyboards, programming, production, mixing (2, 5, 8, 9)
- Steve Stoll – drums

Additional performers

- Van Christie – recording (2)
- Dwayne Goettel – keyboards (7)
- Jim Marcus – recording (2)
- Al Jourgensen – guitar solo (2)uncredited

Production and design

- Sascha Konietzko – production, mixing (2, 5, 8, 9)
- Dave Ogilvie – mixing (1, 3, 4, 6, 7)
- Small Icon Graphics – cover art
- Martin Stebbing – recording (1, 3–9)

== Release history ==
Region	Date	Label	Format	Catalog
United States	1992	Wax Trax!	CD, CS	WAX 7187
Japan	1994	Polystar	CD	PSCW-5073
United States	1994	TVT/Wax Trax!	CD	TVT 7187
