= Revolution (Sister Machine Gun album) =

[R]evolution

Studio album by Sister Machine Gun
- Released: April 20, 1999
- Studio: Various: Chicago Trax Recording Studio; (Chicago, IL); Dinovo's House of Sound; (Chicago, IL); Warzone Recorders; (Chicago, IL)
- Genre: Industrial rock
- Length: 52:26
- Label: Positron!
- Producer: Van Christie, Abel Garibaldi, Chris Randall

Sister Machine Gun chronology
Metropolis (1997)	[R]evolution (1999)	6.0 (2000)

[R]evolution is the fifth studio album by Sister Machine Gun, released on April 20, 1999 by Positron! Records.

== Reception ==
Professional ratings
Review scores
Source	Rating
AllMusic	2.5/5 stars

Steve Huey of allmusic gave [R]evolution a two and a half out of five stars, saying "there are enough strong moments to make the record an overall success."

== Track listing ==
All lyrics are written by Chris Randall; all music is composed by Sister Machine Gun.

No.	Title	Length
1.	"Libertad"	4:07
2.	"Carbon Copy"	3:19
3.	"Got to Be"	3:59
4.	"Smash Your Radio!"	3:47
5.	"Transient One"	4:28
6.	"Transient Two"	6:21
7.	"Closer to Me"	4:03
8.	"Wrong"	5:00
9.	"Vibrator"	6:09
10.	"Autoloader"	3:30
11.	"Strange"	3:03
12.	"Bring You Down (Take You Higher)"	4:37

== Personnel ==
Adapted from the [R]evolution liner notes.

Sister Machine Gun

- Chris Randall – lead vocals, guitar, keyboards, programming, production, mixing

Additional performers

- Abel Garibaldi – bass guitar, production, mixing
- Nate Lepine – saxophone
- Shara O'Neil – backing vocals
- Kevin Temple – drums, percussion

Production and design

- Bad Mamma Jamma Ink. – cover art, design
- Van Christie – production, mixing

== Release history ==
Region	Date	Label	Format	Catalog
United States	1999	Positron!	CD	POSI003
