= Ajax (band) =

- Origin: New York, United States
- Genres: Electronica
- Years active: 1989 – 1996
- Labels: Wax Trax! Records; Zoo Entertainment; Infinite Love
- Past members: Arleen L. Mitchel (1989-1996); Michael Roy (1989-1990); Michael Hornburg (1989-1990); Joseph Hornof (1994-1996)

Ajax was an American, New York-based band, led by female singer Arleen Mitchel. The outfit released the single "Mind the Gap" in 1989, on Wax Trax! Records. A full-length self-titled debut LP followed, which combined industrial and acid-house music. The album, and its two singles failed to chart.

Mitchel revived the name in the 1990s, most successfully on the 1995 single "Ex-Junkie" which became a minor club hit. "Ex-Junkie" is the band's first (and to date last) entry on the Billboard Hot Dance/Club chart, peaking at number 48.

== Discography ==
=== Albums ===
Year	Title	Label
1990	Ajax	Wax Trax!
1995	Aphrodite	Zoo Entertainment

=== Singles ===
Year	Song	Chart U.S. Dance	Album	Label
1989	"Mind the Gap"	-	Ajax	Wax Trax!
1990	"One World"	-	Ajax	Wax Trax!
1994	"Evening Chanting"	-	non-album single	Infinite Love
1995	"Ex-Junkie"	48	Aphrodite	Zoo Entertainment
1995	"Experience No. 2"	-	Aphrodite	Zoo Entertainment

- Chart information courtesy of Billboard.com and AllMusic
