= Supernaut (song) =

Song by Black Sabbath

Song by Black Sabbath

from the album Vol. 4
- Released: September 1972
- Recorded: 1972
- Genre: Heavy metal
- Length: 4:28
- Label: Warner Bros.
- Songwriters: Ozzy Osbourne, Tony Iommi, Geezer Butler, Bill Ward
- Producers: Patrick Meehan, Black Sabbath

"Supernaut" is the fifth song from the 1972 album Vol. 4 by English heavy metal band Black Sabbath. When played live, the song frequently featured a lengthy drum solo which expands on the percussion break of the original studio recording.

The song has received positive reviews (Fred Thomas of Allmusic said it was "one of the most intense songs in the band's catalog") and many prominent musicians have spoken highly of "Supernaut". In an interview with Q magazine, Beck named the "Supernaut" guitar riff as one of his favorites, along with Neil Young's "Cinnamon Girl". Frank Zappa also admired the song, saying: "I like it because I think it’s prototypical of a certain musical style, and I think it’s well done. Also, I happen to like the guitar lick that’s being played in the background." Drummer John Bonham also liked "Supernaut", according to recollections of Black Sabbath drummer Bill Ward.

== Personnel ==
- Ozzy Osbourne – vocals
- Tony Iommi – guitars
- Geezer Butler – bass guitar
- Bill Ward – drums, percussion

Technical personnel

- Colin Caldwell, Vic Smith – engineering
- Patrick Meehan – production

== 1000 Homo DJs version ==
"Supernaut"

Single by 1000 Homo DJs
- B-side: "Hey Asshole"
- Released: 1991
- Recorded: Chicago Trax Recording Studio
- Genre: Industrial rock
- Length: 14:51
- Label: Wax Trax!
- Songwriters: Ozzy Osbourne, Tony Iommi, Geezer Butler, Bill Ward
- Producer: Hypo Luxa

1000 Homo DJs singles chronology
"Apathy" (1988)	"Supernaut" (1991)

The song was covered by Ministry side project 1000 Homo DJs in 1991. It was released as 12-inch and CD single. The CD version of the single also contains the songs "Apathy" and "Better Ways", from the band's 1988 debut single, "Apathy."

Ned Raggett of AllMusic praised the cover, writing that "the title track is something else again, one of Al Jourgensen's best efforts at creating completely over-the-top industrial death disco."

Trent Reznor of Nine Inch Nails recorded the original vocals for the "Supernaut" cover. His vocals were not officially used because Reznor's label TVT Records refused to allow his appearance on the release. An oft-repeated story tells that instead of recording new vocals, the band's frontman Al Jourgensen merely altered Reznor's performance through a distortion effect to mask his identity.

Both Reznor and Jourgensen dismissed this claim. In a 1992 Prodigy post regarding "Supernaut", Reznor wrote, "[I] finally told Al to redo it without me. The version that Wax Trax put out is Al, the version on the NIN [bootleg] single is me." Jourgensen made a similar statement in a 2003 interview. When asked whose vocals appear on "Supernaut", Jourgensen replied, "That would be me on the original, on WaxTrax! The later version released on TVT was Trent Reznor... then the remixed version had my vocals on it."

The version with Reznor's vocals was eventually released on the compilation album Black Box – Wax Trax! Records: The First 13 Years. The version of the song with Al Jourgensen's vocals was also featured on the Black Sabbath tribute album Nativity in Black.

=== Track listing ===
12" single

1. "Supernaut" – 6:42
2. "Hey Asshole" – 8:09

CD release

1. "Supernaut" – 6:42
2. "Hey Asshole" – 8:09
3. "Apathy" – 4:36
4. "Better Ways" – 5:23

=== Personnel ===
- Count Ringworm – vocals on "Hey Asshole"
- Al Jourgensen (as Buck Satan) – bass, guitar, vocals, vox organ on "Supernaut"
- Ike Krull – guitar on "Supernaut"
- Officer Agro – drums, vocals, vox organ on "Hey Asshole"
- Wee Willie Reefer – drums on "Supernaut"
- Viva Nova – vocals on "Hey Asshole"
- The Temple Of Drool Choir – vocals on "Hey Asshole"
- Trent Reznor – vocals on "Supernaut" (uncredited)

Technical personnel

- Critter – engineering
- Frisky – second engineering

== Other cover versions ==
- Coalesce on the 2007 reissue of their Led Zeppelin tribute EP entitled There is Nothing New Under the Sun and also on the Hydra Head Records Black Sabbath tribute album In These Black Days: Vol. 3.
- Ministry performed "Supernaut" on their 1992 Psalm 69 tour, and, as Ministry & Co-Conspirators, recorded it for their compilation album Cover Up.
- The joint venture of Los Coronas and Arizona Baby covered the song in their 2011 live album Dos Bandas y un Destino.
- STEMM (from Niagara Falls) for Crossroads (2011).
- Mastodon covered the song during Ozzy Osbourne and Black Sabbath's final concert Back to the Beginning that had drummer Brann Dailor on vocals with the drum solo performed by Mario Duplantier, Danny Carey, and Eloy Casagrande.
- Jake Duszik of Health remarked that hearing the song makes him want to drink 100 beers
