= Influence =

Influence may refer to:

- Social influence, in social psychology, influence in interpersonal relationships
  - Minority influence, when the minority affect the behavior or beliefs of the majority

== Science and technology ==
- Sphere of influence (astrodynamics), the region around a celestial body in which it is the primary gravitational influence on orbiting objects
- Sphere of influence (black hole), a region around a black hole in which the gravity of the black hole dominates that of the host galaxy's bulge

== Law ==
- Undue influence, in contract law, where one person takes advantage of a position of power over another person

== Politics ==
- Sphere of influence, in political science, an area over which a state or organization has some indirect control
- Agent of influence, an agent of some stature who uses his or her position to influence public opinion or decision making to produce results beneficial to the country whose intelligence service operates the agent
- Office of Strategic Influence, a short-lived U.S. government department

== Film, television and theatre ==
- Influence (film), a 2020 Canadian/South African documentary
- The Influence (2010 film), a South Korean film
- The Influence (2019 film), a Spanish horror film
- La influencia (2007 film), or The Influence, a Spanish drama film
- Influenced (film), a 2026 American comedy film
- Influence (play), a 2005 play by David Williamson
- "Influence" (The Good Doctor), a 2020 TV episode
- "Influence" (Law & Order: Special Victims Unit), a 2006 TV episode

== Music ==
- Influence (band), a rock band formed in the 1960s

=== Albums ===
- The Influence (album), an album by jazz artist Jimmy Raney.
- Influences (album), a 1984 album by Mark King
- Influence (Ardijah album), a 1996 album by the New Zealand group Ardijah
- Influence (Sister Machine Gun album), a 2003 album by Sister Machine Gun
- Influence, a 1992 album by Little Caesar

=== Songs ===
- "Influence", a song by Tove Lo from Lady Wood
- "Influence" (Sister Machine Gun song), a song by Sister Machine Gun from the album Influence (Sister Machine Gun album)
- Influencer (song), a 2017 single from Japanese group Nogizaka46

== Other uses ==
- Driving under the influence, the criminal act of driving while intoxicated
- Influence: Science and Practice, and Influence: The Psychology of Persuasion; two books by Robert Cialdini
- The Influence (Monhegan, Maine), a house in the United States

== See also ==
- Persuasion
- Manipulation (disambiguation)
- Influenza (disambiguation)
- Influencer (disambiguation)
