= Influencer (disambiguation) =

An influencer is a person who is influential, typically on social media.

Influencer may also refer to:

- Influencer marketing, a form of marketing involving endorsements and product placements
- "Influencer" (song), by Japanese girl group Nogizaka46
- Influencer (film), directed by Kurtis David Harder
  - Influencers (film), the sequel to the film above

== See also ==
- Social influence
- Internet celebrity
- Influence (disambiguation)
