= Craig Gilmore =

American actor (born 1968)

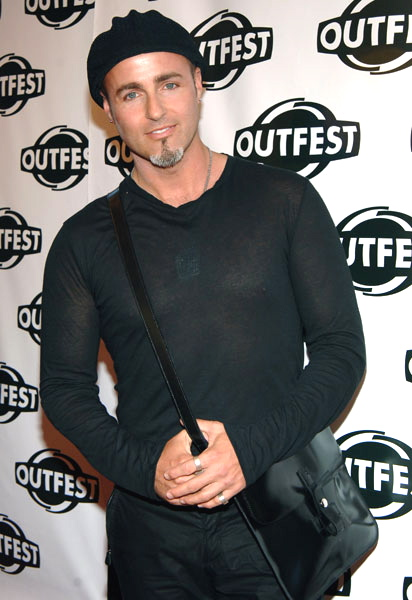
- Occupation: Film actor

Craig Gilmore (born 1968) is an American actor. He is most widely known for his roles in the New Queer Cinema films The Living End and Totally Fucked Up.

Since 2001, Gilmore has been singing and acting with Opera a la Carte, a Gilbert & Sullivan repertory troupe, and is currently described as their lead tenor.

== Biography ==
Born and raised in Northern California, Gilmore began acting in musical theatre at 18. After training at the American Conservatory Theater in San Francisco, he studied at the Manhattan School of Music in New York.
