= Trait (album) =

EP by Pailhead
- Released: 1988
- Recorded: 1986–1988
- Genre: Industrial rock, industrial metal
- Length: 24:02
- Label: Wax Trax!
- Producer: Hypo Luxa, Hermes Pan

Professional ratings
Review scores
Source	Rating
AllMusic	3/5 stars
MusicHound Rock	3/5 stars

Trait is the sole extended play by American industrial rock band Pailhead. The original EP was released in 1988, containing the first four songs in a slightly different order. When re-released on CD in the early 1990s, the group's first single ("I Will Refuse" b/w "No Bunny" 12") was added as a bonus.

== Artwork ==
The album cover is an slightly altered photo of one of the tornadoes that formed above Austin, Texas during the 1922 Austin tornado outbreak.

== Track listing ==
=== Original vinyl EP ===
==== Side One ====
1. "Don't Stand in Line" – 3:47
2. "Ballad" – 3:53

==== Side Two ====
1. "Man Should Surrender" – 3:40
2. "Anthem" – 4:45

=== CD ===
1. "Man Should Surrender" – 3:40
2. "Anthem" – 4:45
3. "Don't Stand in Line" – 3:47
4. "Ballad" – 3:53
5. "I Will Refuse" – 4:17
6. "No Bunny" – 5:00

== Personnel ==
- Ian MacKaye – vocals, guitar
- Al Jourgensen – guitar
- Paul Barker – bass
- Bill Rieflin – drums (tracks 1–5)
- Eric Spicer – drums (track 6)
