= Animal Liberation (album) =

Compilation album by Various Artists
- Released: April 21, 1987
- Genres: Industrial, new wave, post-punk, synth-pop
- Label: WaxTrax!
- Producer: Al Jourgensen

Animal Liberation is an album released by WaxTrax! records on April 21, 1987, to benefit PETA.

Al Jourgensen of Ministry served as a producer on the album. Jourgensen doesn't perform on the album, but did produce all the links between tracks, news clips, quotes, etc., along with Bill Rieflin, Paul Barker, and Roland Barker. Paul Barker is credited in the sleeve notes as "Ion Barker," a regular pseudonym of his. Although this was an American release, the CD says "Made In England." The UK version included an extra track by The Smiths. The album was compiled and coordinated by Dan Mathews.

Jourgensen's band does not appear on Animal Liberation due to contractual issues with the band's label.

The Washington Post reported the songs "address such topics as vivisection, the fur industry, the meat industry and hunting." The Chicago Tribune reported the album was a "worthy project" and the album "features songs concerning animal rights issues such as hunting and laboratory experimentation."

== Track listing ==
1. Al Jourgensen - "International Introduction" (1:36)
2. Nina Hagen / Lene Lovich - "Don't Kill The Animals" (Rescue Version) (6:36)
3. Al Jourgensen - "Civil Disobedience Is Civil Defence" (0:58)
4. Attrition - "Monkey In A Bin" (2:26)
5. Chris & Cosey - "Silent Cry" (3:27)
6. Al Jourgensen - "Lab Dialogue" (0:24)
7. Lene Lovich - "Supernature" (5:40)
8. Al Jourgensen - "Life Community" (0:49)
9. Colour Field - "Cruel Circus" (3:58)
10. Luc van Acker - "Hunter" (3:31)
11. Shriekback - "Hanging Fire" (3:00)
12. Captain Sensible - "Wot? No Meat!" (3:11)
13. Al Jourgensen - "Meat Farmer" (0:28)
14. Howard Jones - "Assault And Battery" (4:50)
