= Disorder (EP) =

EP by Front Line Assembly
- Released: May 1988
- Recorded: 1988
- Genres: Industrial, electro-industrial
- Length: 25:26 (original); 41:24 (reissue)
- Labels: Third Mind, Wax Trax!, Cleopatra Records

Front Line Assembly chronology
Corrosion (1988)	Disorder (1988)	Convergence (1988)

Professional ratings
Review scores
Source	Rating
Melody Maker	Favorable
Music Week	Favorable

Disorder is a studio mini-album (and fourth major release overall) by Canadian electro-industrial band Front Line Assembly, released in 1988. Initially, Disorder was only released on vinyl, although it received a wide distribution due to both Third Mind Records and Wax Trax! Records serving as the labels. The album featured the band's first music video, "Body Count". The majority of Disorder was released on a record called Convergence, along with the Corrosion album. Disorder was also reissued by Cleopatra Records, which tacked on three songs that were recorded during the same era (those three songs were the exclusive additions on the aforementioned Convergence compilation).

== Track listing ==
All tracks are written by Bill Leeb and Michael Balch.

Third Mind/Wax Trax! release Side A
No.	Title	Length
1.	"Body Count"	4:15
2.	"Obsession"	4:07
3.	"Aggression"	4:55

Side B
No.	Title	Length
1.	"Lurid Sensation"	4:05
2.	"Die-Sect"	4:38
3.	"The Wrack"	3:26

Cleopatra release
No.	Title	Length
1.	"Body Count"	4:17
2.	"Obsession"	4:05
3.	"Aggression"	5:07
4.	"Lurid Sensation"	4:02
5.	"Die-Sect"	4:44
6.	"The Wrack"	3:20
7.	"Solitude of Confinement"	6:35
8.	"Collision"	4:46
9.	"Headcase Fargone"	4:28
Total length:		41:24

== Personnel ==
=== Front Line Assembly ===
- Bill Leeb – vocals, electronic instruments
- Michael Balch – electronic instruments

=== Technical personnel ===
- Dave Ogilvie – engineering (A1, A3), mixing (A2, B1, B3)
- Eddie Stromboli – cover
