= Convergence (Front Line Assembly album) =

Compilation album by Front Line Assembly
- Released: 1988
- Genre: Electro-industrial
- Length: 69:31
- Labels: Third Mind, Wax Trax!
- Producer: Front Line Assembly

Front Line Assembly chronology
Disorder (1988)	Convergence (1988)	Gashed Senses & Crossfire (1989)

Professional ratings
Review scores
Source	Rating
AllMusic	4.5/5 stars
Melody Maker	Favorable
Music From the Empty Quarter	Favorable
Select	2/5 medals

Convergence is a compilation album by Canadian industrial artist Front Line Assembly. This release contains all but two tracks from the Corrosion and Disorder releases, "The Wrack Part III - Wisdom" and "Aggression" respectively. Three additional songs from the same era is also included on Convergence: "Solitude of Confinement", "Headcase Fargone", and "Collision". The majority of Convergence's contents would later be reissued in 1995 on the Corroded Disorder compilation.

== Track listing ==
All tracks are written by Bill Leeb and Michael Balch, except where noted.

No.	Title	Length
1.	"Lurid Sensation"	4:05
2.	"Obsession"	4:07
3.	"Controversy"	5:20
4.	"Right Hand of Heaven"	5:46
5.	"Conflict" (Leeb)	5:54
6.	"Solitude of Confinement" (Leeb)	6:37
7.	"Body Count"	4:15
8.	"Die-Sect"	4:38
9.	"Headcase Fargone" (Leeb)	4:28
10.	"Collision" (Leeb)	4:47
11.	"Concussion"	4:14
12.	"On the Cross" (Leeb)	5:49
13.	"Dark Dreams" (Leeb)	6:05
14.	"The Wrack Part 1"	3:26

- Tracks 1, 3–5, 11–13 from Corrosion.
- Tracks 2, 7, 8, 14 from Disorder.
- Tracks 6, 9, 10 previously unreleased.

== Personnel ==
=== Front Line Assembly ===
- Bill Leeb – vocals, electronic instruments, mixing (2, 5, 8, 11–13)
- Michael Balch – electronic instruments, mixing (2, 5, 6, 8–13)

=== Technical personnel ===
- Dave Ogilvie – mixing (1, 3, 4, 7, 14)
