= Steve Stoll (musician) =

American techno musician and label owner (born 1967)

Steve Stoll (born 1967, as Stephen Stollmeyer) is an American techno musician and label owner.

Stoll also produces under monikers such as Acid Farm, Ausgang, The Blunted Boy Wonder, Cobalt, Critical Mass, Dark Man, Datacloud, Floating Point, Mr. Proper, The Operator, Storm, Systematic, Test Tones, LAMENT, and Time Attack.

== Life ==
Stoll was born in Staten Island, New York, and raised in Brooklyn, where he learned to play drums. He had three siblings, a brother named Glen, and two sisters, Dorothy and Maria. In the late 1980s he became interested in electronic music while he was drumming for the independent label Wax Trax! Records.

After high school he joined the US Army and served for five years, most notably in the Gulf War. After his release he played drums for Sister Machine Gun, studied Jazz music and later started to produce techno music.

He was signed by Richie Hawtin's label Probe in 1992, where his first solo release Datacloud was released in 1993. Since the mid 1990s he produced a string of minimal techno and acid techno releases. He also collaborated with musicians such as Pete Namlook, Ken Ishii, Damon Wild and Patrick Codenys of Front 242. Besides releases for novamute, Music Man and Djax-Up-Beats he also runs his own label Proper NYC.

Steve left the public eye around 2017 with his final live performance. He does not maintain any social media and prefers to work in solitude producing under multiple aliases.

== Selected discography ==
- 1994: Storm – The Art Of Sync (Djax-Up-Beats)
- 1995: Acid Farm – The Silver Spiral (Proper N.Y.C.)
- 1996: The Operator – Zero Divide (Play It Again Sam)
- 1997: Steve Stoll – Damn Analog Technology (Sm:)e Communications)
- 1998: Steve Stoll – The Big Apple Bites Back (Mirakkle Records)
- 1998: Steve Stoll – The Blunted Boy Wonder (NovaMute)
- 1999: Steve Stoll – Supernatural (Proper N.Y.C.)
- 2000: Steve Stoll presents The Blunted Boy Wonder – Innuendo (Music Man Records)
- 2002: Steve Stoll – Public Address Live (Proper N.Y.C.)
- 2003: Steve Stoll – Was Here (FAX +49-69/450464)
- 2005: Steve Stoll – Exiled (FAX +49-69/450464)
- 2008: Steve Stoll – Locate (Locate)
- 2008: Steve Stoll – Zero Point Crossings (FAX +49-69/450464)
- 2009: Jeff Green & Steve Stoll – Tangled (Databloem)
- 2014: Steve Stoll – Praxis (Psychonavigation Records)
