= A Split-Second =

Belgian electronic body music band

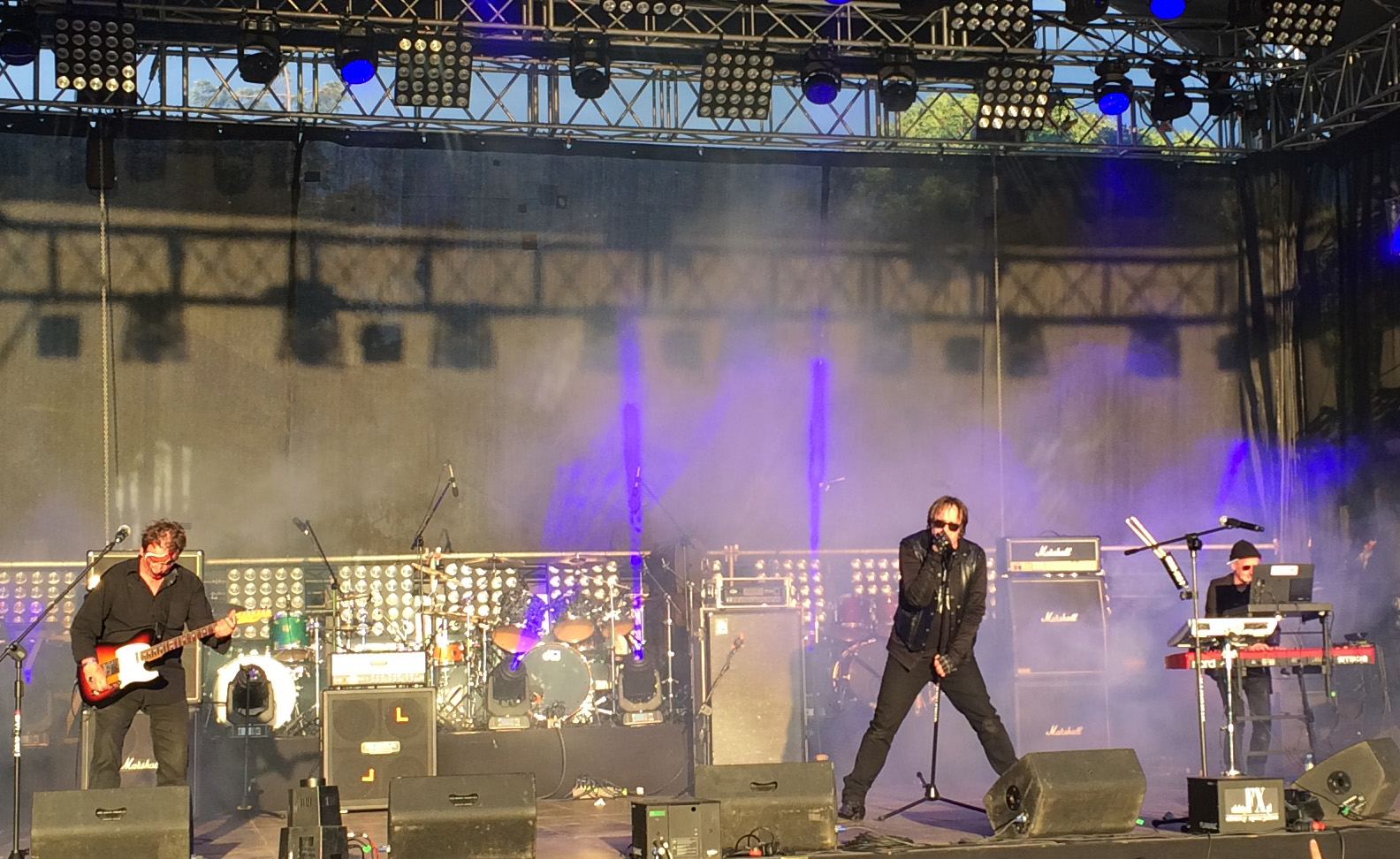

Background information
- Origin: Belgium
- Genres: EBM, new beat
- Years active: 1985–1991, 1994, 2004, 2009–current
- Labels: Antler/Antler-Subway, Animalized; Hypnobeat; Wax Trax!; Caroline
- Members: Marc Heyndrickx
- Past members: Peter Bonne

A Split-Second is a Belgian new beat and electronic body music (EBM) band established in 1985. The band is seen as one of the pioneers of EBM and their music influenced the creation of the new beat genre.

== History ==
The project was born in 1985 as a solo project of Marc Heyndrickx (under the name Marc Ickx), who self-released the demo-tape "Stained Impressions" with Peter Bonne (Also known as Chrismar Chayell) producing some of the songs. Bonne at that time was releasing music as Twilight Ritual together with vocalist Geert Coppens. To record the demo, Ickx spent the last of his money on an amp with double tape deck and spent the holidays in the offices of Independent Films. Having heard the initial material, Chayell invited Ickx to record more songs in his 4-track studio.

Antler records signed the band immediately upon hearing the first demo. After signing to Antler Records, A Split-Second made their debut in 1986 with a self-titled mini album featuring a.o. the tracks "Flesh" and "On Command". The latter track was included in the compilation album "This Is Electronic Body Music". It was followed the next year by the album Ballistic Statues.

In late 1988, they were signed to the American label Wax Trax! Records, and released the albums A Split-Second and From The Inside in the US, the latter featuring the track "Colosseum Crash" . The single "Mambo Witch" peaked at number 29 in 1989 on the Billboard US dance club charts in 1989. That year the band embarked on their first US tour with 24 dates.

Their 1990 album, Kiss of Fury, featured the track "The Parallax View", which peaked at number 19 on the Billboard US dance club charts in 1991. Kiss of Fury saw the band moving towards more of a guitar-based sound, something that Ickx attributed to some of the material originally having been intended for his own solo album. For this release, the band continued with Antler-Subway in Europe, but left Wax Trax! for Caroline Records in the US. The band embarked on a second, 24 date US tour in 1990, and Peter Bonne was replaced for this tour by Nico Mansy on keyboards. Meanwhile, "Flesh" peaked in the UK Singles Chart at number 68 in December 1991.

In March 1995 album "Megabite" was released.

In 2012, the band headlined the Belgian Bodybeats festival and re-released their first demo on vinyl.

== Influence and legacy ==
A Split-Second's debut single "Flesh" is credited with starting the new beat genre. Although there is some variance in recalling who did what and why, the idea is that DJs began the style by spinning EBM records at a slower tempo to create a new sound. One such perspective: "Fat Ronnie's inspiration snowballed when Marc Grouls and a handful of other DJs were listening to 'Flesh', the latest 12" from Belgian electronic band A Split Second in Antwerp's USA Import record store. By slowing the pitch control down to a lurching 33 (33+8), Marc transformed the track from pleasant Euro-Industrialism to the melodramatic, pomp-laden epic that's been firing London warehouses all summer."

In 2002, Perfecto Records released a progressive trance remix of "Flesh", produced by Paul Oakenfold.

== Touring members ==
- Peter Meyvaert (guitar, 1987–89)
- Swan (guitar, 1987–89)
- Fedzjean Venvelt (guitar, 1989–90 / 1994–96)
- Nicolas Mansy (keyboards, 1990–91)
- Kevin Strauwen (guitar 2024)

== Discography ==
=== Albums ===
- Stained Impressions (1985)
- Ballistic Statues (1987)
- ... from the Inside (1988)
- Kiss of Fury (1990)
- Flesh and Fire – 1991 Remixes (1991)
- Introversion (Lay Back and Join) (1991)
- Vengeance C.O.D. (1993)
- Megabite (1995)
- Transmix (2001)

=== Singles ===
- "Flesh" (1986)
- "Rigor Mortis" (1987)
- "Smell of Buddha" (1987)
- "Mambo Witch" (1988)
- "Scandinavian Bellydance" (1988)
- "The Colosseum Crash" (1989)
- "Another Violent Breed" – The Live Versions (1989)
- "Firewalker" (1990)
- "Backlash" (1990)
- "The Parallax View" (1991)
