= Burn (Sister Machine Gun album) =

Studio album by Sister Machine Gun
- Released: October 24, 1995
- Studio: Various: Britannia Row Studios; (Wandsworth, UK); Warzone Recorders; (Chicago, IL)
- Genre: Industrial rock
- Length: 56:04
- Label: TVT/Wax Trax!
- Producer: Chris Randall

Sister Machine Gun chronology
The Torture Technique (1994)	Burn (1995)	Metropolis (1997)

Burn is the third studio album by Sister Machine Gun, released on October 24, 1995 by TVT and Wax Trax! Records. The album peaked at #9 on the CMJ Radio Top 200.

== Reception ==
Professional ratings
Review scores
Source	Rating
AllMusic	2/5 stars

Vincent Jeffries of allmusic gave Burn a two out of five stars, saying "the depth and complexity of the mixes confirm a modicum of growth for the singer/guitarist/programmer."

== Track listing ==
All tracks are written by Sister Machine Gun, except "Strange Days" by Jim Morrison.

No.	Title	Length
0.	"Strange Days" (The Doors cover)	4:20
1.	"Red"	5:29
2.	"Overload"	4:47
3.	"Hole in the Ground"	5:29
4.	"Disease"	3:32
5.	"Burn"	4:46
6.	"Dispossessed"	3:45
7.	"Better Than Me"	3:59
8.	"Snake"	4:58
9.	"I Don't Believe"	5:36
10.	"Inside"	8:43

== Notes ==
- Burn has two hidden tracks on the CD release. The first is a cover of The Doors, "Strange Days" which is found by rewinding the CD to -4:20 on a CD player (this may not work on software media players). The second is a reprise of the song "Inside" found at 8:43 on the final track.
- The title track was part of the soundtrack of the 1995 film adaptation of Mortal Kombat.
- The track "Better Than Me" was part of the 1996 film Scream, and also in the soundtrack.

== Personnel ==
Adapted from the Burn liner notes.

Sister Machine Gun

- Chris Randall – lead vocals, keyboards, programming, production, recording, mixing

Additional performers

- Dan Agne – effects, recording technician, backing vocals (5)
- Bob Jones – bass guitar
- Chris Kelly – backing vocals (3)
- Wolf Larson – saxophone
- Geno Lenardo – guitar
- Jim Marcus – additional programming
- Jason McNinch – guitar, effects, recording, mixing
- Chris Smits – guitar
- Mars Williams – saxophone

Production and design

- Van Christie – recording, mixing, additional production (4, 7, 8, 10)
- John Fryer – recording, mixing, additional production (1–3, 5, 6, 9)
- James Loughrey – recording technician
- Michael D. Ryan – management
- Zack F. Seaman – photography, design
- Mique Willmott – cover art, design, illustrations
- Stephen Yates – recording technician

== Release history ==
Region	Date	Label	Format	Catalog
United States	1995	TVT/Wax Trax!	CD, CS	TVT 7229
