= Metropolis (Sister Machine Gun album) =

Studio album by Sister Machine Gun
- Released: July 15, 1997
- Studio: Various: Battery Studios K2; (New York City, NY); Chicago Recording Company; (Chicago, IL); Warzone Recorders; (Chicago, IL)
- Genre: Industrial rock
- Length: 53:24
- Label: TVT/Wax Trax!
- Producer: John Fryer, Chris Randall

Sister Machine Gun chronology
Burn (1995)	Metropolis (1997)	[R]evolution (1999)

Metropolis is the fourth studio album by Sister Machine Gun, released on July 15, 1997 by TVT and Wax Trax! Records. The album spent more than 14 weeks on the CMJ Radio Top 200 chart, peaking at #7.

== Reception ==
Professional ratings
Review scores
Source	Rating
AllMusic	4/5 stars

Stephen Thomas Erlewine of allmusic gave Metropolis a four out of five stars, saying "even if the group isn't showing any signs of great leaps in creativity, Metropolis is one of the group's most consistent efforts, offering a pummeling array of rattling beats and shattering guitars."

== Track listing ==
All lyrics are written by Chris Randall; all music is composed by Sister Machine Gun.

No.	Title	Length
1.	"This Metal Sky"	2:28
2.	"Desperation"	3:45
3.	"Temptation"	4:38
4.	"Think"	3:49
5.	"Living Without You"	3:51
6.	"Torque"	4:05
7.	"White Lightning"	4:52
8.	"Everything"	4:59
9.	"What Do You Want From Me"	4:12
10.	"Admit"	5:05
11.	"Bitter End"	5:20
12.	"Cut Down"	6:11

== Notes ==
- Recorded at Warzone Recorders & Chicago Recording Company, Chicago and Battery Studios K2, New York by John Fryer, Chris Randall, Van Christie III, Jason McNinch, and Matt Warren.
- Mixed at Battery Studios K2 by John Fryer and Chris Randall and Warzone Recorders by Van Christie III and Jason McNinch.
- Assisting at Battery was Martin Czembor
- Assisting at Warzone was Abel Garibaldi
- Metropolis was produced by Chris Randall and John Fryer, except track 4 produced by Chris Randall and Van Christie III. Additional production by Jason McNinch.
- Most of the analog synth sounds on this record were created using the Studio Electronics SE-1 and sampling was accomplished with the Kurzweil K2500.
- Chris Randall plays Parker Guitars.
- The song Bitter End contains an intro sample from the 1996 song Ratfinks, Suicide Tanks, Cannibal Girls by White Zombie, from the Beavis And Butt-head soundtrack.

== Accolades ==
Year	Publication	Country	Accolade	Rank
1997	CMJ New Music Monthly	United States	"Dance"	11
"*" denotes an unordered list.

== Personnel ==
Adapted from the Metropolis liner notes.

Sister Machine Gun

- Chris Randall – lead vocals, guitar, keyboards, Hammond B3, piano, programming, production, recording

Additional performers

- Catherine Bent – cello
- Martin Czembor – mixing, backing vocals
- Richard Deacon – bass guitar
- Ted Falcon – violin
- John Fryer – effects, additional programming, backing vocals, recording, additional production
- Reeves Gabrels – guitar
- Serena Jost – cello
- Lisa Randall – spoken word (1)
- Amanda Riesman – string arrangement
- Brian Sarche – guitar
- Kevin Temple – drums
- Rob Thomas – violin
- Mars Williams – saxophone

Production and design

- Van Christie – spoken word, recording, mixing, production (4)
- Abel Garibaldi – mixing
- Robin Glowski – design
- Jason McNinch – additional programming, recording, mixing, additional production (4)
- Michael D. Ryan – management
- Matt Warren – recording

== Release history ==
Region	Date	Label	Format	Catalog
United States	1997	TVT/Wax Trax!	CD, CS	TVT 7244
Japan	1998	D:Pop/Noiz Works	CD	DRCN-25024
