= Positron! Records =

American independent record label

Positron Records
- Founded: 1998
- Founder: Chris Randall
- Genre: Electronic, Industrial rock
- Country of origin: U.S.
- Location: Chicago, Illinois; Mill City, Oregon; Phoenix, Arizona
- Official website: www.positronrecords.com

Positron Records was an independent record label founded in Chicago, Illinois, in 1998 by Chris Randall, frontman of the industrial band Sister Machine Gun. The label subsequently followed Randall's relocations to Mill City, Oregon, and Phoenix, Arizona.

== History ==
Positron was established following Sister Machine Gun's departure from Wax Trax! Records, providing Randall with a platform for "radical transparency" in the music industry. Describing itself as an "anti-label," the company focused on a limited release schedule to provide concentrated support for a small roster of artists rather than pursuing mass-market saturation.

The label was an early pioneer in the Creative Commons movement. In 2004, Positron began releasing albums under CC licenses, allowing individuals to legally share, remix, and sample the music for private or commercial use. This move was highlighted by publications such as PC Magazine and Sound on Sound as a landmark case for independent music distribution in the digital age.

During the label's operation, Randall founded the music software company Audio Damage. Many later Positron releases, particularly Randall's work under the pseudonym Micronaut, served as a testing ground for the company's signal processing plugins. The label also operated KPOSI, an early internet radio station dedicated to streaming industrial and electronic music.

== Artists ==
- Amish Rake Fight (project of Machines of Loving Grace member Mike Fisher)
- The Atomica Project
- Bizarbies
- Bounte
- Eco-Hed
- Chris Randall (also recording as Micronaut)
- S. Sturgis
- Scanalyzer
- Sister Machine Gun
- Matt Walker (as Beautiful Assassins and also Impossible Recording Machine)

== Label compilations ==
The label released a series of compilations titled the Komposi series, which the label marketed as an "audio blueprint" of the Positron sound. These releases featured exclusive tracks and remixes:

- Komposi001 (2002)
- Komposi002 (2003)
- Komposi003 (2006)

== See also ==
- List of record labels
