= Larry Sherman =

American record publisher (died 2020)

- Died: April 8, 2020
- Occupation: Record publisher

Larry Sherman (died April 8, 2020) was an American record publisher who helped the rise of house music in the United States. A Chicago businessman, he owned Precision Record Pressing and founded multiple record labels, most notably Trax Records. He was 70 years old.

== Labels ==
- Hiphouzzz Records
- Housetime Records
- Trax Records
- Precision Records
- Lost Records
- Maad
- No Labull Records
- Saber Records
- Zig-Zig
- Zoneaphone Records
- Macadjous
- Demand Records
- R & R Record Review
- Record Review
