= 1000 Homo DJs =

Side project of industrial music band Ministry

- Origin: Chicago, Illinois, U.S.
- Genres: Industrial rock
- Years active: 1988, 1990
- Label: Wax Trax!
- Past members: Buck Satan (Al Jourgensen); Officer Agro; Ike Krull (Mike Scaccia); Wee Willie Reefer (Bill Rieflin); Viva Nova; Count Ringworm (Jello Biafra); Trent Reznor (uncredited)

1000 Homo DJs was a side project of American industrial rock band Ministry. The project released two singles, one of which featured a cover of Black Sabbath's "Supernaut".

1000 Homo DJs began as a side project to release outtakes from Ministry's The Land of Rape and Honey. The credits read "Another Luxa/Pan Production", which was the production pseudonym for Ministry members Al Jourgensen and Paul Barker.

== Origin of name ==
Two different stories explaining the band's name have circulated, both involving Jourgensen and Wax Trax! Records executive Jim Nash.

In the notes for the 1994 box set Black Box, a story is related that Jourgensen disapproved of an unauthorized dance remix of the song "We Shall Cleanse the World" from Revolting Cocks' debut album Big Sexy Land. Nash jokingly comforted Jourgensen, saying the remix would only be heard by "a thousand homo DJs".

In a 2004 interview, Jourgensen explained that he played some demo recordings for Nash, who disliked the music and stated: "No one's gonna buy this. It'll take one thousand homo DJs to play this for one person to buy it."

== Members ==
The members of 1000 Homo DJs were identified by pseudonyms in the CD liner notes. However, most of their identities are fairly certain.

- Buck Satan: Al Jourgensen
- Officer Agro: speculated to be Jeff Ward, but possibly Paul Barker or Martin Atkins
- Ike Krull: Mike Scaccia
- The Temple of Drool Choir: Mike O'Connell, Wes Kidd, Brian St. Clair, Herb Rosen, Joe Kelly, David "Slash" Weidman, Jerry Rodgers
- Wee Willie Reefer: William Rieflin
- Viva Nova: also known as Mel'Amour and P.A.M., and later known as Vivanovachicago, but often misidentified as Patty Jourgensen
- Count Ringworm: Jello Biafra

=== Trent Reznor's involvement ===
The nature of Nine Inch Nails frontman Trent Reznor's contribution to 1000 Homo DJs' records has been debated. What is certain is that Reznor recorded the original vocals for "Supernaut". This performance was not officially used because Reznor's label, TVT Records, refused to allow his appearance on the release. Reznor's version would ultimately be released as "Supernaut (Trent Reznor Vocal Version)" by TVT four years later on the retrospective Black Box - Wax Trax! Records: The First 13 Years, following TVT's purchase of Wax Trax!.

Jourgensen's immediate response to TVT's ultimatum is uncertain. An oft-repeated story tells that instead of recording new vocals, Jourgensen merely ran Reznor's performance through a distortion effect to mask its identity. According to this story, every WaxTrax! recording of "Supernaut" contains Reznor's vocals. However, a dissenting group claims this is an urban legend, and that Jourgensen did record new vocals for the EP—albeit in a similar style to Reznor's initial performance. Statements made by both Reznor and Jourgensen seem to confirm the latter view. In a 1992 Prodigy post regarding "Supernaut", Reznor said,

[I] finally told Al to redo it without me. The version that Wax Trax put out is Al, the version on the NIN [bootleg] single is me.

Reznor referred to the two-track Suck bootleg, which contained the recording of "Supernaut" that later appeared on Black Box. Jourgensen made a similar statement in a 2003 interview. When asked whose vocals appear on "Supernaut", Jourgensen replied, referring to the WaxTrax! EP, Black Box, and Greatest Fits versions, respectively (and corroborating that only the "Trent Reznor Vocal Version" contained Reznor's performance, and that Jourgensen in fact sang on most versions of the song):

That would be me on the original, on WaxTrax! The later version released on TVT was Trent Reznor... then the remixed version had my vocals on it.

== Discography ==
=== Singles ===
- "Apathy" 12" single (1988, Wax Trax! Records)
- "Supernaut" 12" single/CD single (1990, Wax Trax! Records)

=== Compilation appearances ===
- "Supernaut" on Pure Devotion (1992, Devotion)
- "Supernaut (Trent Reznor Vocal Version)" on Black Box - Wax Trax! Records: The First 13 Years (1994, Wax Trax! Records)
- "Supernaut" on Nativity in Black: Tribute to Black Sabbath (1994, Columbia Records)
- "Supernaut" on Moshpit Madness (1994, SPG Music Productions Ltd.)
- "Supernaut" on The Black Bible (1998, Cleopatra Records)
- "Supernaut" (remixed) on Ministry's Greatest Fits (2001, Warner Bros. Records)
- "Supernaut" on Hardest Hits - Modern Rock of the 80s (2003, SPG Music Productions Ltd.)
- "Apathy", "Supernaut", "Better Ways" and "Hey Asshole" on Ministry's Side Trax (2004, Rykodisc)
- "Supernaut" (remixed) on Ministry & Co-Conspirators' Cover Up (2008, 13th Planet Records)
- "Apathy", "Supernaut", "Better Ways", "Hey Asshole", "Supernaut (Trent Vocal)" and "Supernaut (Dub Mix)" on Ministry's Trax! Box (2014, Cleopatra Records)
- "Supernaut (Die Krupps Remix)" on Occult Box (2015, Cleopatra Records)
