= Braindead Soundmachine =

American industrial rock band

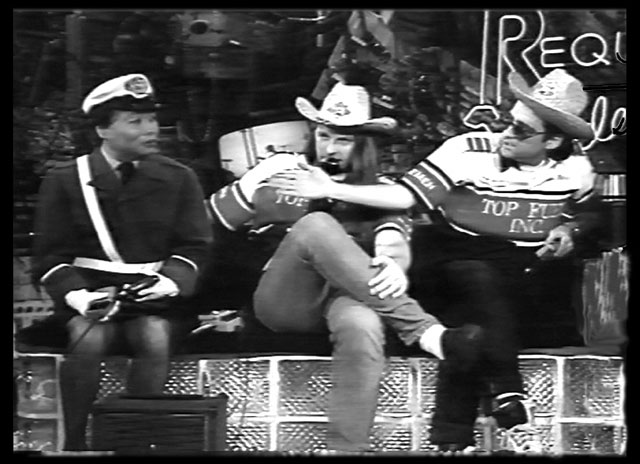
- Braindead Soundmachine: Yoshi, Reality, Coonce

Background information
- Origin: Los Angeles, California, United States
- Genres: Industrial rock
- Years active: 1989–1993
- Labels: Wax Trax! Nitronic Research; Play It Again Sam; Shiver; Artlos
- Past members: Cole Coonce; Mr. Reality; Ikky Shivers; Jenny Homer (aka "Jen Jen"); Bones Murphy; Khalsoum Salloum; Prince Num-E-Num; Bo Fingers
- Website: kerosenebomb.com/braindead

Braindead Soundmachine was an American industrial rock band founded by Cole Coonce, Warren Croyle ("Mr. Reality"), and Lee Howell ("Ikky Shivers"). Eschewing the industrial genre, the band coined the term "metaldisco" in reference to their musical style.

== History ==
After Coonce and Howell quit the Long Beach art-rock band Outer Circle in 1984, they founded Braindead Soundmachine in Los Angeles, California, United States, in 1989, with speed metal record producer Croyle. The trio conceptualized "metaldisco," a genre that melded Black Sabbath riffs topped by disco rhythm guitar and ethereal female vocals. The sound was rounded out by Shivers, a Los Angeles sound engineer, whose contribution consisted of non-musical screeching noises made from his collections of vintage analog synthesizers.

Braindead uses female vocalists, including those of Joan Jones from Sun 60, Khalsoum Salloum and JenJen (Jenny Homer from Downy Mildew). The band followed the ethos that "there are no mistakes", with only one rule: "no chord changes." The band's approach to making music was also informed by its insistence that Yoshi, a Japanese transgender woman working as a cocktail waitress in East Hollywood, was in fact "Dogvillasan," a deity (or "Coyote God") summoned by the group in the song of the same name.

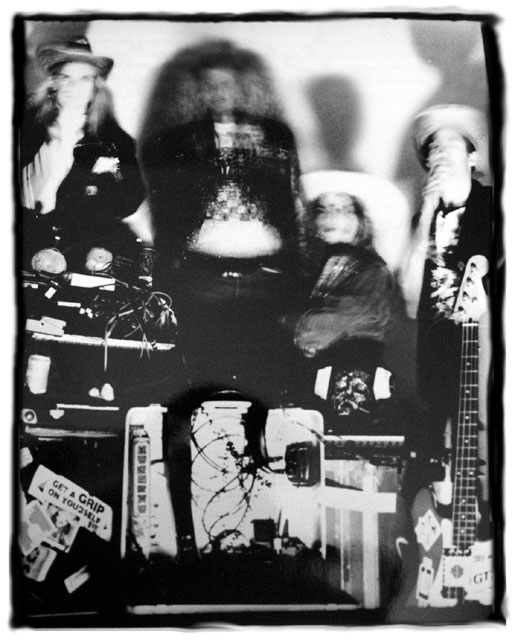
Braindead Soundmachine: (left to right) Ikky Shivers, Mr. Reality, Khalsoum Salloum, and Cole Coonce

In 1990, Braindead procured a recording contract with Chicago's Wax Trax! Records, which put out the band's first long-playing compact disc, Come Down from the Hills and Make My Baby. Singles from that album included "I'm in Jail," and a cover of Patsy Cline's "Walkin' After Midnight" (whose release included remixes of the song produced by KMFDM founder Sascha Konietzko).

In 1992, Coonce scored the Gregg Araki indie film The Living End, a queer road movie that also featured Braindead's version of the Jesus and Mary Chain song that gave the film its title.

As Wax Trax! began to go bankrupt, Braindead extricated itself from their contract.

Braindead's second album, Give Me Something Hard I Can Take To My Grave, was distributed on Shiver Records in the United States and Artlos in Europe.

The group disbanded in 1994 during pre-production for its never-released third album. Later, Mr. Reality suggested only using one chord per composition by mandating that new songs use only "one note," an idea that Coonce found unworkable. After it, the three founding members quit music and procured employment as sound engineers in game shows and the adult film industry, as documented in Coonce's memoirs about the music business, released in 2005, also entitled Come Down from the Hills and Make My Baby.

In 1995, the band regrouped for its final musical endeavor, recording the source music for Dan Zukovic's cult film The Last Big Thing, a satirical attack on the entertainment culture of Los Angeles.

Eventually, Coonce changed occupations and became a freelance drag strip journalist for publications National Dragster, Hot Rod Magazine and WIRED. Later, a feature-length book on the history of the land speed record, Infinity Over Zero. In 2007, JenJen collaborated with Coonce on a new musical venture entitled Prozac Pop Machine. Their first single is "Shampoo" and is currently available as a podcast-only.

Croyle is now CEO of the multi-media conglomerate Reality Entertainment. Originally an outlet for ponderous and aggressive speed metal bands, Reality signed seminal disco music stars KC and the Sunshine Band to a recording contract in 2006, a move for which Croyle states that "KC has affected generations of music lovers around the world, we are thrilled to have KC on the Reality roster."

== Musical style ==
In interviews, Braindead cites their influences. They employed N.W.A's hip hop drum machine sound, Black Sabbath's bass lines and the guitar stylings of Chic, Fela Kuti and Funkadelic.

== Discography ==
=== Albums ===
- Come Down from the Hills and Make My Baby (Wax Trax!, 1991)
- Give Me Something Hard I Can Take to My Grave (Shivers Records, 1993)

=== Singles and EPs ===
- "I'm in Jail" b/w "Dogvillasan" (Nitro Records, 1990)
- "I'm in Jail" (Wax Trax!, 1991)
- "Walkin' After Midnight" b/w "Everybody, Everybody" (Wax Trax!, 1992)
- "Where the Pavement Ends" b/w "Soon Come, Goddammit" (Artlos, 1993)
