= Acid Horse =

American musical project

- Origin: Chicago, Illinois, USA
- Genres: Industrial rock
- Years active: 1989
- Labels: Wax Trax!
- Spinoff of: Ministry; Cabaret Voltaire
- Past members: Al Jourgensen; Chris Connelly; Paul Barker; Stephen Mallinder; Richard H. Kirk

Acid Horse was a one-off collaborative side project between two industrial music pioneers, Ministry and Cabaret Voltaire. Only one single, "No Name, No Slogan", was released in 1989 on Wax Trax! Records. The band name combines the slang terms for LSD (acid) and heroin (horse), and plays on the title of the then-popular acid house movement.

As with many other Ministry side projects, such as PTP and Revolting Cocks, the band members' identities are masked by pseudonyms. The members are as follows:

- Alien Dog Star — Al Jourgensen
- Gallopin' Scorpiosaddlebutt — Chris Connelly
- Biff — Stephen Mallinder
- Tennessee King — Paul Barker
- Harold Sandoz — Richard H. Kirk

Musically, Acid Horse resembles fellow Ministry side project PTP, in that it blends an upbeat electronic rhythm section with catchy guitar work. Option editor Sandy Masuo described it as "an unlikely collision of house-style mixing and spaghetti western ambience à la Ennio Morricone"; in the same article, Jourgensen said that despite being able to work with one of industrial's prominent acts, the collaboration was also disappointing:

"I found it really sad that these complete pioneers, who were once willing to take risks, come here to Chicago because of the house explosion. [...] They wanted to do a house record, and they didn't understand that they informed house music through people copying them. And now they're back here to copy themselves off other people?"

Acid Horse was formed after Mallinder and Kirk, the "pioneers" Jourgensen was referring to, had come to Chicago to work with house producer Marshall Jefferson.

Goldmine author Jo-Ann Greene pointed out that "No Name, No Slogan" is "strangely reminiscent" of English synthpop duo Blancmange's 1983 single "Blind Vision". Evidence that "No Name, No Slogan" might have been written using "Blind Vision" as a reference track is available on SoundCloud.
