= Chris Randall (musician) =

American musician

- Born: Christopher Wendell Randall; 1968 (age 57–58); Waikiki
- Origin: Honolulu, Hawaii
- Genres: Electronica, industrial rock, jazz fusion
- Occupations: Musician, songwriter
- Instruments: Digital programming, guitar
- Years active: 1989–present
- Label: Positron! Records

Chris Randall (born 1968) is an American musician and the current frontman of Sister Machine Gun. In 1998, he created a side-project called Micronaut, focusing on more instrumental music that was not necessarily appropriate for Sister Machine Gun.

After disbanding Sister Machine Gun in 2007, he began his solo career and released the EP Cheap Sensation and the full-length album The Devil His Due. Chris also collaborates with Wade Alin from Christ Analogue on the IDM project Scanalyzer. In 2015 he rebanded Sister Machine Gun to release The Future Unformed on WTII.

In 1998, he founded his self owned label, Positron! Records, and also runs Audio Damage, a creator of music software plug-ins and synthesizer modules.

== Discography ==
=== Sister Machine Gun ===
- 1992: Sins of the Flesh
- 1994: The Torture Technique
- 1995: Burn
- 1997: Metropolis
- 1999: [R]evolution
- 2000: Transient 5.2 EP
- 2000: 6.0
- 2003: Influence
- 2015: The Future Unformed

=== Micronaut ===
- 1998: Micronaut
- 2000: Io
- 2002: Ganymede
- 2005: Europa
- 2006: Pasiphae
- 2007: Bhopal Muffin
- 2008: Callisto
- 2009: Frampton, Comes Alive
- 2010: Resistor
- 2010: Capacitor
- 2010: Study One
- 2025: technocolored - unalbumed micronaut 97 - 10

=== Scanalyzer ===
- 2007: On the one and the zero

=== Solo ===
Albums

- 2007: The Devil His Due
- 2014: floats on air

EPs

- 2007: Cheap Sensation
- 2012: electromechanical
- 2020: Depth of Field

== YACHT Controversy ==
In January 2009, Pitchfork reported that Jona Bechtolt of YACHT publicly admitted to using pirated versions of Audio Damage software. The statements resulted in three-and-a-half-year legal battle between Bechtolt and Randall, in what Pitchfork described as a "Nerd Flame War."
