= Sister Machine Gun =

American industrial rock band

- Origin: Chicago, Illinois
- Genres: Industrial rock
- Years active: 1990–2007, 2015–present
- Labels: Positron!, TVT, Wax Trax!, WTII
- Members: Chris Randall
- Past members: Steve Stoll; Chris Kelly; Miguel Turanzas; Guilherme Machado

Sister Machine Gun is an American industrial rock band originally based in Chicago, Illinois.

Sister Machine Gun was formed in New York City by Chris Randall and Guilherme Machado. After a short hiatus, the band signed with Wax Trax! Records and released their debut album, Sins of the Flesh, in 1992. The band went through several lineup changes over the years, with their sound evolving throughout their career. After leaving Wax Trax! Records, they moved to Randall's own label, Positron! Records. In 2007, the band disbanded, and Randall pursued a solo career. However, Sister Machine Gun returned in 2015 with a new album The Future Unformed, released on WTII Records.

== History ==
=== The early years ===
Sister Machine Gun was formed by Chris Randall and Guilherme Machado in New York City. They performed at New Jersey's Pipeline, and New York's Limelight. Their name comes from a lyric in the Skinny Puppy song "Tin Omen." The band went on a short hiatus after Chris Randall joined KMFDM's tour as a stage technician. After the tour, Randall left New York City and relocated to Chicago. He then found work in the mailroom of Wax Trax! Records, and began recording a demo with Jim Marcus and Van Christie of Die Warzau. The rough demo was given to Sascha Konietzko of KMFDM for mixing. Konietzko passed the demo along to Jim Nash, head of Wax Trax! Records, where Randall worked. The label then signed the band to a record deal.

=== The Wax Trax! years ===
Sister Machine Gun's debut album Sins of the Flesh was released on Wax Trax! in 1992. During this time, Chris Randall assembled a group of musicians to tour in support of the album. Tom Gaul and Steve Stoll joined the band, alongside Chris Kelly and Randall. Stoll left the band after this tour, and work on the next album began.

The Torture Technique was released in 1994. Tom Gaul left midway through the recording process, after contributing to the album. New members were recruited for the upcoming tour. Guitarist Greg Lucas (later a member of Final Cut) joined, as well as drummer Scott Churilla (later a member of The Reverend Horton Heat's band). Sister Machine Gun went on to join the Angstfest tour with KMFDM and Chemlab.

After this tour, Kelly left the band. Prior to the recording of Burn, Sister Machine Gun went on another tour. The lineup during this time consisted of Randall, bassist Bob Jones, drummer Tom DeSalvo (former member of Chemlab), and Chris Smits on guitar.

The band then began work on the album Burn. Guitarist Geno Lenardo (of Filter) joined in the studio. Burn was released in 1995. The album peaked at #9 on the CMJ Radio Top 200. The title track became one of the band's most recognizable songs, as it later appeared on the Mortal Kombat soundtrack.

The tour line-up at this time consisted of Randall, bassist Richard Deacon, and drummer Kevin Temple (formerly of Die Warzau and later Apartment 26). This line up remained mostly consistent throughout the touring for Burn and Metropolis, with guitarists Pat Sprawl and Brian Sarche joining at various times.

The final Sister Machine Gun album on Wax Trax!, Metropolis, was released in 1997. The album spent more than 14 weeks on the CMJ Radio Top 200 chart, peaking at #7. Reeves Gabrels did guitar work on the album.

=== The Positron! years ===
After 1997's Metropolis album, Sister Machine Gun left Wax Trax. The rest of the band's material was released on Randall's Positron! Records, the record label he founded and operated with his ex-wife, Lisa. The band's sound changed considerably after their move to the new label.

In 2007, Sister Machine Gun officially disbanded and Randall began a solo career.

=== New material (2015) ===
On November 5, 2014, a Facebook page for Sister Machine Gun was launched, along with a teaser image announcing the project's return in early 2015 on WTII Records. This image was also shared on Randall's personal Facebook account with the caption, "Remember that thing I said I'd never do again? Yeah. I'm doing it. Spring '15 on WTII Records."

On March 13, 2015, the band released The Future Unformed.

== Primary member history ==
Guilherme Machado joined Randall in Chicago for the recording of the band's debut album, Sins of the Flesh. After recording some guitar parts, Machado left the band. After the completion of the album, Chris Kelly joined the band. After Kelly's departure in 1995, Randall continued the band primarily as a solo project. Miguel Turanzas joined the band in 1999, and continued as a member until it was disbanded in 2007.

== Partial discography ==
=== Studio albums ===
- Sins of the Flesh (1992; WaxTrax! Records)
- The Torture Technique (1994; WaxTrax!/TVT Records)
- Burn (1995; WaxTrax!/TVT Records)
- Metropolis (1997; WaxTrax!/TVT Records)
- [R]evolution (1999; Positron! Records)
- 6.0 (2000; Positron! Records)
- Influence (2003; Positron! Records)
- The Future Unformed (2015; WTII Records)
