= PTP (band) =

American industrial music group

The industrial band PTP (Programming the Psychodrill) was a short-lived side project of Wax Trax! Records artists.

The first PTP track, "Show Me Your Spine," was recorded in 1986. Written by Al Jourgensen and Paul Barker of Ministry and Nivek Ogre of Skinny Puppy, it marked the first collaboration between the three. The track appeared briefly during the club scene in the first RoboCop movie (1987) but did not appear on the soundtrack. The song was not commercially released until 2004 when it appeared on Ministry's Side Trax compilation. Musically, it is representative of the early Wax Trax sound, featuring arpeggio melodies, loud drums, sampled orchestral hits and Ogre's heavily distorted vocals.

PTP released the "Rubber Glove Seduction" single in 1989 on Wax Trax. It was reissued in 1993 on TVT. The b-side was a song titled "My Favorite Things." Both were written by Jourgensen, Barker and Chris Connelly. "Rubber Glove Seduction" became a club hit with Connelly's deadpan lyrics: "Tick tick tock I am the kitchen clock / Tick tick tock this is my wife / Tick tick tock I am the kitchen clock / Tick tick tock this is my knife." Sped up vocals swirled through the mix, some of which offered a commentary on the song itself when slowed down. "My Favorite Things" featured a throbbing bass line and a guitar solo. The CD liner notes were cryptic. The listed band personnel were:

- $corpio (Chris Connelly): big bass drum, vocals
- Alien Dog Star (Alain Jourgensen): pan flute, finger cymbals
- Frenchie l'Amour (Paul Barker, also of Ministry): Spanish guitars

The liner notes state "Another Luxa/Pan Production" credit, a mention of the engineer (Littlefellow) and the studio (ursini/hyams recorders). A slogan "where you always save more money" is also included, a reference to a popular low-budget Chicago commercial from the 1980s for the Celozzi-Ettleson Chevrolet car dealership.

== Discography ==
Singles

=== Rubber Glove Seduction (1989) ===
| No. | Title | Length |
|---|---|---|
| 1. | "Rubber Glove Seduction" | 5:26 |
| 2. | "My Favorite Things" | 4:30 |

=== Side Trax (2004) ===
- "Show Me Your Spine"
