= Every Day Is Halloween: The Anthology =

Compilation album by Ministry
- Released: October 5, 2010
- Genre: Industrial metal, thrash metal
- Label: Cleopatra
- Producer: Al Jourgensen

Ministry chronology
MiXXXes of the Molé (2010)	Every Day Is Halloween: The Anthology (2010)	Undercover (2010)

Singles from Every Day Is Halloween: The Anthology
- 1. "Thunderstruck" Released: 2010

Every Day Is Halloween: The Anthology is a compilation/remix album by Ministry, released on October 5, 2010. It features songs originally recorded by AC/DC, Jimi Hendrix, The Rolling Stones and Amy Winehouse. It was also released under the names Every Day Is Halloween: Greatest Tricks and Undercover. The latter is credited to Ministry and Co-Conspirators and has a different track list.

== Track listing ==
No.	Title	Writer(s)	Length
1.	"Every Day is Halloween" (2010 Evil Version)	Al Jourgensen	4:30
2.	"N.W.O." (Remix)	Al Jourgensen, Paul Barker	5:29
3.	"Jesus Built My Hotrod" (Remix)	Al Jourgensen, Paul Barker, Bill Rieflin, Michael Balch, Gibby Haynes	4:54
4.	"Stigmata"	Al Jourgensen	5:51
5.	"Paint It Black" (The Rolling Stones cover)	Mick Jagger, Keith Richards	4:02
6.	"Khyber Pass" (2010 Remix)	Al Jourgensen, Paul Raven, Tommy Victor	6:51
7.	"Stranglehold" (Ted Nugent cover)	Ted Nugent	4:09
8.	"Iron Man" (Black Sabbath cover)	Tony Iommi, Ozzy Osbourne, Geezer Butler, Bill Ward	6:01
9.	"Thunderstruck" (AC/DC cover)	Angus Young, Malcolm Young	4:20
10.	"Purple Haze" (The Jimi Hendrix Experience cover)	Jimi Hendrix	4:10
11.	"Sharp Dressed Man" (ZZ Top cover)	Billy Gibbons, Dusty Hill, Frank Beard	4:01
12.	"Rehab" (Amy Winehouse cover)	Amy Winehouse	4:49
13.	"Every Day Is Halloween" (Retro Electro Remix)	Al Jourgensen	6:03
Total length:			59:13

== Personnel ==
- Al Jourgensen – vocals, bass (1, 2, 5, 7, 9–11), keyboards (1, 5, 6, 8, 10), slide solo (3, 11), bass samples (4), rhythm guitar (4, 10), mandolin (5, 9), lead guitar (10), horn arrangements (12), production
- Mike Scaccia – rhythm & lead guitar (1–3, 5, 7–9, 11, 12), classical guitar (5), guitar (6), bass (8, 12)
- Erie Loch – programming (2, 4), additional programming/remixing
- Liz Constantine – vocals (6)
- Paul Raven – bass (6)
- Tommy Victor – guitar (6)
- Samuel D'Ambruoso – background vocals (9, 11), engineer, drum programming
- Andrew Davidson – background vocals (9, 11, 12), assistant engineer, programming
- Billy Gibbons – guitar (11)
- Karma Cheema – background vocals (12), assistant engineer, programming
- Jurgen Engler – production (13)
- Dave Donnelly – mastering
