= I Wanted to Tell Her =

Song by Ministry

Single by Ministry and Shay Jones

from the album With Sympathy
- B-side: "I Wanted to Tell Her" (remix)
- Released: April 1983
- Recorded: Late 1982
- Studio: Syncro Sound, Boston
- Genre: New wave; synth-funk
- Length: 5:29
- Label: Arista, BMG
- Songwriters: Alain Jourgensen, Shay Jones
- Producers: Vince Ely, Ian Taylor

Ministry singles chronology
"Work for Love" (1983)	"I Wanted to Tell Her" (1983)	"Revenge" (1983)

Audio
- "I Wanted to Tell Her" by Ministry on YouTube

"I Wanted to Tell Her" is a single by American industrial band Ministry. Written by frontman Al Jourgensen and guest singer Shay Jones, and co-produced by Vince Ely and Ian Taylor, it was released as the second single from Ministry's debut studio album, With Sympathy (1983). Previously, the song first appeared as "Primental", an instrumental released in 1981 as part of Ministry's debut single, "I'm Falling/Cold Life".

== Reception ==
"I Wanted to Tell Her" is one of the most popular songs from With Sympathy, charting on both the US Dance and NZ charts. The song was picked as an AllMusic reviewer's pick.

== Track listing ==
7" Vinyl (US)

1. "I Wanted to Tell Her" (edit) – 3:55
2. "A Walk In the Park" – 4:58

7" Vinyl (US promo)

1. "I Wanted to Tell Her" (edit) – 3:55
2. "I Wanted to Tell Her" (mono) – 3:55

12" Maxi-single (US)

1. "I Wanted to Tell Her" (remix) – 6:57
2. "I Wanted to Tell Her" (dub) – 4:45
3. "Effigy" – 3:51
4. "Revenge" – 3:48

7" Vinyl (UK)

1. "I Wanted to Tell Her" (remix edit) – 3:57
2. "I Wanted to Tell Her" (Tongue-Tied remix) – 4:45

12" Vinyl (EU)

1. "I Wanted to Tell Her" (remix) – 6:57
2. "I Wanted to Tell Her" (Tongue-Tied remix) – 4:45

12" Maxi-single (EU)

1. "I Wanted to Tell Her" (remix) – 6:57
2. "I Wanted to Tell Her" (Tongue-Tied remix) – 4:45
3. "A Walk In the Park" – 4:58

NOTE: Although not listed as such on the sleeves, all 12" versions (as well as the UK 7") use an alternate performance of the song that differs from the one on With Sympathy. The "Tongue-Tied remix" and "dub" version are the same.

== Covers ==
The song was covered in 2011 by electronic duo Holy Ghost!, with support from The Juan MacLean and female vocals handled by Nancy Whang.

== Charts ==
Chart (1983)	Peak position
New Zealand (RMNZ)	35
US Dance Club Songs (Billboard)	13

== Personnel ==
Ministry

- Al Jourgensen – vocals, guitar, keyboards
- Stephen George – drums
- Robert Roberts – keyboards
- John Davis – keyboards (original version)
- Martin Sorenson – bass (original version)
- Mark Pothier – keyboards (re-recorded version)
- Brad Hallen – bass (re-recorded version)

Additional personnel

- Walter Turbitt – guitar
- Shay Jones – feature vocals
- David Shortt – design
- Ian Taylor – production
