= The Squirrely Years Revisited =

Studio album of re-recorded songs by Ministry
- Released: March 28, 2025
- Genres: Industrial metal; synth-pop; new wave
- Length: 55:20
- Label: Cleopatra
- Producers: Al Jourgensen; Michael Rozon

Ministry studio albums chronology
Hopiumforthemasses (2024)	The Squirrely Years Revisited (2025)	Hate to Go – Take Out or Delivery (2026)

Professional ratings
Review scores
Source	Rating
Sputnikmusic	3.5/5

The Squirrely Years Revisited is a studio album by American industrial metal band Ministry, released on March 28, 2025 by Cleopatra Records. It contains re-recorded songs from the band's synth-pop era, including the song "Everyday Is Halloween", four songs from With Sympathy, and three songs from Twitch. A music video for the reworked "Everyday is Halloween" was released on YouTube on March 31, 2025.

== Reception ==
JR Moores of The Quietus praised The Squirrely Years Revisited as "the most compelling record Ministry have put out in absolute yonks".

== Track listing ==
All songs written by Al Jourgensen.

No.	Title	Length
1.	"Work for Love"	4:05
2.	"Here We Go"	4:16
3.	"All Day"	4:28
4.	"Everyday Is Halloween"	5:20
5.	"Revenge"	3:58
6.	"I'm Not an Effigy"	5:25
7.	"I'm Falling"	3:54
8.	"Same Old Madness"	3:51
9.	"I'll Do Anything for You"	5:19
10.	"Just like You"	4:10
11.	"We Believe"	5:22
12.	"Over the Shoulder"	5:12
Total length:		55:20

== Personnel ==
- Al Jourgensen – vocals, guitars, bass, keyboards
- Cesar Soto – guitars
- Monte Pittman – guitars
- Paul D'Amour – bass
- John Bechdel – keyboards
- Roy Mayorga – drums

Additional personnel

- Al Jourgensen – engineering, production
- Michael Rozon – programming, engineering, production
- Charlie Clouser – additional programming, keyboards
- Dez Cuchiara, Gilden Tunador, Leni Von Eckardt – background vocals
- Ben Garcia – cover and layout
