= Just One Fix =

1993 song by Ministry

Single by Ministry

from the album Psalm 69: The Way to Succeed and the Way to Suck Eggs
- Released: January 21, 1993
- Recorded: 1991
- Genre: Industrial metal
- Length: 5:11
- Label: Sire; Warner Bros.
- Songwriters: Al Jourgensen; Paul Barker; Bill Rieflin; Michael Balch
- Producers: Hypo Luxa; Hermes Pan

Ministry singles chronology
"N.W.O." (1992)	"Just One Fix" (1993)	"The Fall" (1995)

"Just One Fix" is the third single from industrial metal band Ministry's 1992 album Psalm 69: The Way to Succeed and the Way to Suck Eggs. The song features samples from Sid and Nancy, Hellbound: Hellraiser II and Frank Sinatra reciting "Just One Fix" (from the movie The Man with the Golden Arm).

The video, directed by Peter Christopherson of the band Coil, features footage of one of Al Jourgensen's influences, author William S. Burroughs. Burroughs also provided the single's cover art.

"Just One Fix" was covered by thrash metal band Sepultura on the album Kairos.

In March 2023, Rolling Stone ranked "Just One Fix", at number 49 on their "100 Greatest Heavy Metal Songs of All Time" list.

== Sampling ==
The song samples Peter Fonda and Bruce Dern’s dialogue about thorazine from the Roger Corman film The Trip, Chloe Webb’s statement on trust from Sid and Nancy, and a sample of an hysterical plea for a fix from the jailhouse scene in Otto Preminger’s The Man with the Golden Arm. The music video features audio of William S. Burroughs saying “bring it all down”, recorded in the studio with Ministry.

It is rumoured that the Rammstein song "Du Hast" is based on the track, or that the guitar riff in the Rammstein track was cut and sampled directly from "Just One Fix" due to the similarity in the guitar riffs of both songs, but the members of Rammstein are quoted as saying that they were simply highly influenced by Ministry.

== Music video ==
A music video for the song was produced, and is notable for featuring Beat author William S. Burroughs in both audio and video samples. This version of the song features an audio sample of Burroughs saying "Bring it all down", and a sample of Chloe Webb's line "Never trust a junkie" from the film Sid and Nancy. The video was featured in an episode of Beavis and Butt-head called "Tornado" and multiple old videos of tornadoes also appears in the music video. In their commentary, Beavis was so shocked during the hematemesis scene that he declared it "beyond the limits of good taste".

== Track listing ==
No.	Title	Credit	Length
1.	"Just One Fix" (12 Inch edit)	Ministry	8:13
2.	"Just One Fix" (Video edit)		4:25
3.	"Quick Fix"	Burroughs/Ministry	4:11

== Personnel ==
=== Ministry ===
- Al Jourgensen – vocals (1, 2), rhythm guitar, programming, production
- Paul Barker – bass, programming, production

=== Additional Personnel ===
- Bill Rieflin – drums
- Mike Scaccia – lead guitar
- Michael Balch – programming
- William S. Burroughs – spoken word (3), cover painting
- Critter Newell – engineering
- Paul Manno – engineering
- Howie Beno – edits and programming
- Jon Blumb – photography
