= Undercover (Ministry album) =

Compilation album by Ministry & Co-Conspirators
- Released: December 6, 2010
- Recorded: 13th Planet Studios, El Paso, Texas
- Genre: Industrial metal
- Length: 59:13
- Label: 13th Planet
- Producer: Al Jourgensen

Ministry & Co-Conspirators chronology
Every Day Is Halloween: The Anthology (2010)	Undercover (2010)	Relapse (2012)

Professional ratings
Review scores
Source	Rating
Classic Rock	6/10 stars

Undercover is an album of cover versions and remixes by Ministry & Co-Conspirators released on December 6, 2010, by Al Jourgensen's record label 13th Planet Records. The album includes remixes and re-recorded versions of previously released songs such as "N.W.O.", "Stigmata", and "Jesus Built My Hotrod", among others. Every Day Is Halloween: The Anthology, which was released October 5 by Cleopatra Records, features almost all of the same songs with the exception of their cover of Black Sabbath's "Paranoid", which is only available on this album.

== Track listing ==
No.	Title	Writer(s)	Length
1.	"Iron Man" (Black Sabbath cover)	Tony Iommi, Ozzy Osbourne, Geezer Butler, Bill Ward	6:01
2.	"Stranglehold" (Ted Nugent cover)	Ted Nugent	4:09
3.	"N.W.O."	Al Jourgensen, Paul Barker	5:29
4.	"Stigmata"	Al Jourgensen	5:51
5.	"Purple Haze" (The Jimi Hendrix Experience cover)	Jimi Hendrix	4:10
6.	"Paranoid" (Black Sabbath cover)	Butler, Iommi, Osbourne, Ward	3:56
7.	"Thunderstruck" (AC/DC cover)	Angus Young, Malcolm Young	4:20
8.	"Sharp Dressed Man" (ZZ Top cover)	Billy Gibbons, Dusty Hill, Frank Beard	4:01
9.	"Jesus Built My Hotrod" (Remix)	Al Jourgensen, Paul Barker, Bill Rieflin, Michael Balch, Gibby Haynes	4:54
10.	"Rehab" (Amy Winehouse cover)	Amy Winehouse	4:49
11.	"Every Day Is Halloween"	Al Jourgensen	4:29
12.	"Paint It Black" (The Rolling Stones cover)	Mick Jagger, Keith Richards	4:02
13.	"Khyber Pass"	Al Jourgensen, Paul Raven, Tommy Victor	6:50
Total length:			59:13

== Personnel ==
- Al Jourgensen - vocals, bass (2, 3, 5, 7, 8, 11, 12), keyboards (1, 5, 11, 12, 13), rhythm guitar (4, 5), lead guitar (5), mandolin (7, 12), slide Solo (8, 9), horn arrangements (10), production
- Mike Scaccia - rhythm guitar (1, 2, 3, 6, 7, 8, 9, 10, 11, 12), lead guitar (1, 2, 3, 6, 7, 8, 9, 10, 11, 12), guitar (13), Classical Guitar (12), bass (1, 6, 10)
- Erie Loch - programming (3, 4), add. programming/remix
- Sammy D'Ambruoso - drum programming, engineering, background vocals (7, 8)
- Andrew Davidson - background vocals (7, 8, 10), programming, assistant engineer
- Karma Cheema - background vocals (10), programming, assistant engineer
- Liz Constantine - vocals (13)
- Paul Raven - bass (13)
- Tommy Victor - guitar (13)
- Dave Donnelly - mastering
- Kade Burt - art direction, design, layout
