= Hopiumforthemasses =

Studio album by Ministry
- Released: March 1, 2024
- Genre: Industrial metal
- Length: 42:37
- Label: Nuclear Blast
- Producer: Al Jourgensen

Ministry studio albums chronology
Moral Hygiene (2021)	Hopiumforthemasses (2024)	The Squirrely Years Revisited (2025)

Professional ratings
Aggregate scores
Source	Rating
Metacritic	64/100
Review scores
Source	Rating
Blabbermouth.net	7.5/10
Classic Rock	4/5 stars
Kerrang!	2/5
Metal Hammer	4/5 stars
New Noise Magazine	5/5 stars
Rock Hard	8.5/10
Sputnikmusic	3.0/5

Hopiumforthemasses (a stylized spelling of Hopium for the Masses) is the sixteenth studio album by American industrial metal band Ministry, released on March 1, 2024. It is the band's first album to feature guitarist Monte Pittman, while the remaining five members of the lineup had appeared on the previous album, Moral Hygiene. Also similar to Moral Hygiene, Hopiumforthemasses features a guest appearance by former Dead Kennedys vocalist Jello Biafra. The album also features former Nine Inch Nails keyboardist Charlie Clouser and Corrosion of Conformity frontman Pepper Keenan.

== Track listing ==
All tracks written by Al Jourgensen except where noted:

Hopiumforthemasses track listing
No.	Title	Writer(s)	Length
1.	"B.D.E."		4:28
2.	"Goddamn White Trash"		4:44
3.	"Just Stop Oil"		4:00
4.	"Aryan Embarrassment"		5:59
5.	"TV Song 1/6 Edition"		3:19
6.	"New Religion"		5:06
7.	"It's Not Pretty"		5:06
8.	"Cult of Suffering"		6:13
9.	"Ricky's Hand" (Fad Gadget cover)	Fad Gadget, Daniel Miller	3:42
Total length:			42:37

== Personnel ==
=== Ministry ===
- Al Jourgensen – lead vocals, guitars (1–4, 6–8), keyboards (2–7, 9), break bass (7), bass (8), organ (8)
- Cesar Soto – guitars (2–7), bass (2–6)
- Monte Pittman – guitars (1–3, 9), bass (1, 9), backing vocals (1, 3–5, 7, 9), additional backing vocals (2)
- Paul D'Amour – bass (7), guitars (7)
- John Bechdel – keyboards (9), backing vocals (9)
- Roy Mayorga – drums (1, 3, 6)

=== Additional personnel ===
- Michael Rozon – programming (1, 3–7), additional backing vocals (1, 3), drum programming (2, 8), backing vocals (2, 4–7)
- Atticus Pittman – additional backing vocals (2)
- Pepper Keenan – vocals (2)
- Liz Walton – backing vocals (4, 7, 8)
- Billy Morrison – guitars (4)
- Jello Biafra – vocals (4)
- Dez Cuchiara – end vocals (7), backing vocals (8)
- Joshua Ray – spoken words (7)
- Victoria Espinoza – backing vocals (8)
- Charlie Clouser – keyboards (8, 9)
- Eugene Hütz – vocals (8)

=== Production ===
- Al Jourgensen – production
- Michael Rozon – engineering
- Alex Ryaboy – additional engineering (8)
- Roy Mayorga – additional engineering (1, 3, 6)
- Billy Morrison – front cover
- Ban Garcia – layout design

== Charts ==
Chart performance for Hopiumforthemasses
Chart (2024)	Peak position
Australian Physical Albums (ARIA)	51
German Albums (Offizielle Top 100)	30
Scottish Albums (Official Charts)	38
Swiss Albums (Schweizer Hitparade)	49
UK Album Downloads (Official Charts)	32
UK Independent Albums (Official Charts)	12
UK Rock & Metal Albums (Official Charts)	6
