= I'm Falling/Cold Life =

Song by Ministry

"I'm Falling / Cold Life"
- Cover for the 1985 Wax Trax! release

Single by Ministry
- A-side: "I'm Falling" (1981, US); "Cold Life" (1982, UK)
- B-side: "Cold Life" (1981, US); "I'm Falling" (1982, UK)
- Released: 1981, 1985 (re-release)
- Recorded: 1981
- Studio: Hedden West Studios (Chicago, IL)
- Genre: Synth-pop; post-punk; funk rock
- Length: 6:11
- Label: Wax Trax! (US); Situation Two (UK)
- Songwriter: Al Jourgensen
- Producers: Al Jourgensen; Jay O'Roarke; Iain Burgess

Ministry singles chronology
| "I'm Falling / Cold Life" (1981) | "Work for Love" (1983) |

"I'm Falling" and "Cold Life" are songs by American Industrial band Ministry. Written by Al Jourgensen, these were first released in 1981 by Wax Trax! Records as the band's debut single. Initially featuring "I'm Falling" as the A-side, the single found success via its B-side, "Cold Life", which was chosen as the A-side on release in the UK. In 1985, during Ministry's short-lived return on Wax Trax!, the single was reissued with "Cold Life" as the A-side.

== Background and composition ==
"I'm Falling" is a synth-pop song which bears influences from British post-punk acts such as The Sisters of Mercy and Killing Joke; in his 2013 autobiography, Ministry: The Lost Gospels..., Jourgensen admitted that "I'm Falling" was influenced heavily by music of Joy Division and The Cure. Meanwhile, "Cold Life" bears influence of 1970s funk and soul acts, and was written about Jourgensen's experience living in a Chicago African-American neighborhood.

Initially, Jourgensen had recorded a demo tape of "I'm Falling" in his apartment, using a newly bought ARP Omni synthesizer, a drum machine, and a reel-to-reel tape recorder. At one occasion, Jourgensen had presented a demo to Jim Nash, the co-founder and co-owner of the independent record label Wax Trax! Records. Impressed by the demo once listening to it, Nash had requested Jourgensen to record a single, as well as to form a touring band.

Jourgensen initially put together a lineup that consisted of drummer Stephen George, bassist Marty Sorenson, and two keyboardists (Paul Taylor and John Davis). Although Taylor contributed in the studio, he was unable to commit to live shows, and thus he was replaced by Robert Roberts. The band went to Hedden West studios with co-producer Jay O'Roarke and the English-born engineer Iain Burgess, while Nash had paid for the band to record. Backing vocalist Steve Brighton, bassist Lamont Welton, and horn player Preston Klik (also of Big Hat and The Book of Holy Lies) were recruited as session musicians. Jourgensen assumed an English accent for his vocals on "Cold Life", like he did on "I'm Falling". Nash and his Wax Trax! partner Danny Flesher liked both recorded songs, but requested Jourgensen to record one more track. He completed an instrumental titled "Primental" for the single; Jourgensen stated that "Primental" resembled some of the music written for performances held by his then-girlfriend Shannon Rose Riley.

== Release ==
The "I'm Falling/Cold Life" single was initially released in late 1981. The first pressing featured a gray and peach packaging portraying Chicago Union Station, designed by Nash and Brian Shanley; the later pressing featured the cover in a die-cut red and yellow motif, also designed by Nash and Shanley. Some time after, in March 1982, the British label Situation Two released the single in Europe with "Cold Life" as the A-side, as well as its extended dub version on the B-side. This release was packaged with a cover depicting four naked men, seemingly taking a sunbath.

The single, mainly its B-side "Cold Life", had achieved immediate success on both dancefloor and college radio in the US and the UK. By September 1982, "I'm Falling/Cold Life" reached No. 5 on the charts of New York-based magazine Rockpool and peaked at No. 45 on the Billboard Hot Dance/Disco chart with approximately 10,000 copies sold, and it was later cited as Wax Trax!'s first hit.

"Cold Life" was featured on the band's 1987 compilation Twelve Inch Singles (1981–1984), with "I'm Falling" appearing on the compilation's 2014 re-release.

== Critical reception ==
In a May 15, 1982 review, Adam Sweeting of Melody Maker named "Cold Life" among the best singles of the week. He had never heard Ministry before and was pleasantly surprised by "superfunk aggression".

== Track listings ==
Original release (1981)
| No. | Title | Length |
|---|---|---|
| 1. | "I'm Falling" | 3:59 |
| 2. | "Primental" | 5:10 |
| 3. | "Cold Life" | 6:11 |

British release (1982)
| No. | Title | Length |
|---|---|---|
| 1. | "Cold Life" (7" substituted a shortened edit) | 6:11 |
| 2. | "I'm Falling" | 4:04 |
| 3. | "Cold Life Dub" (only available on 12") | 6:53 |

American re-release (1985)
| No. | Title | Length |
|---|---|---|
| 1. | "Cold Life" | 6:11 |
| 2. | "I'm Falling" | 3:59 |
| 3. | "Primental" | 5:10 |
| 4. | "Cold Life Dub" | 6:18 |

== Chart positions ==
| Chart (1982) | Peak position |
|---|---|
| US Dance Club Songs (Billboard) | 45 |

== Accolades ==
| Year | Publication | Country | Accolade | Rank | Ref. |
|---|---|---|---|---|---|
| 2014 | Barney Harsent | United States | "Top 10 Goth Grooves" | 1 | |

== Personnel ==
Credits adapted from liner notes of the singles and Twelve Inch Singles (1981–1984).

Ministry

- Al Jourgensen – vocals, guitars, co-production
- Stephen George – drums
- Marty Sorenson – bass
- John Davis – keyboards
- Robert Roberts – keyboards (re-release)
- Paul Taylor – keyboards (original)

Additional

- Lamont Welton – bass on "Cold Life"
- Steve Brighton – backing vocals on "Cold Life"
- Preston Klik – horns on "Cold Life"
- Jay O'Roarke – co-production on "I'm Falling"
- Iain Burgess – engineering, co-production on "Cold Life"
- Nancy Taylor – assistant engineering
- Jim Nash – cover design
- Brian Shanley – cover design

== Release history ==
| Region | Date | Label | Format | Catalog |
|---|---|---|---|---|
| United States | 1981 | Wax Trax! Records | Vinyl record | 110072X |
| United Kingdom | 1982 | Situation Two | Vinyl record | SIT17 |
| United States | 1985 | Wax Trax! Records | Vinyl record | WAX 003 |
