= Filth Pig =

Studio album by Ministry
- Released: January 30, 1996
- Recorded: 1994–1995
- Genres: Industrial metal; sludge metal
- Length: 54:24
- Label: Warner Bros.
- Producers: Hypo Luxa; Hermes Pan

Ministry chronology
ΚΕΦΑΛΗΞΘ (1992)	Filth Pig (1996)	Dark Side of the Spoon (1999)

Singles from Filth Pig
- 1. "The Fall" Released: December 1995; 2. "Lay Lady Lay" Released: February 1996; 3. "Reload" Released: July 1996; 4. "Brick Windows" Released: January 1997

Professional ratings
Review scores
Source	Rating
AllMusic	2/5 stars
Cash Box	favourable
Christgau's Consumer Guide	C
Collector's Guide to Heavy Metal	5/10
Encyclopedia of Popular Music	3/5 stars
NME	7/10
Rolling Stone	2/5 stars
The Rolling Stone Album Guide	3/5 stars
Spin	6/10
Wall of Sound	79/100

Filth Pig is the sixth studio album by American industrial metal band Ministry, released on January 30, 1996, by Warner Bros. Records. The title was allegedly derived from a statement made in the British Houses of Parliament, in which the band's leader Al Jourgensen was described as a "filthy pig" for his onstage theatrics by MP Teddy Taylor.

Despite being the band's highest-charting album in the US, it was negatively received by reviewers, sharply divided the band's fanbase, and did not live up to the platinum-selling success of Psalm 69. Despite poor sales, the album entered several charts, peaking at the highest positions Ministry has ever achieved. This would be the last Ministry album with Mike Scaccia on guitar until 2004's Houses of the Molé.

== Background ==
Filth Pig marked a major shift artistically for the band from their previous album. Jourgensen said everyone around him wanted him to continue making music similar to Psalm 69. However, he wanted to move away from using samples and focus on a slower, heavier sound. Jourgensen rejected any songs that sounded like their previous work.

"Everyone hated [Filth Pig]. They all wanted Psalm 70, and I gave them an electronic-free record full of gun-in-mouth dirges of nothing but pain. Aside from the cover art, the humour was gone. All that was left was misery. And I still had to tour the fucking thing - which went down in history as the interminable, intolerable, absolutely depraved Sphinctour."

— Al Jourgensen (2013)

The 2002 live album Sphinctour was generally well received by critics.

== Track listing ==
No.	Title	Writer(s)	Length
1.	"Reload"	Al Jourgensen, Paul Barker	2:26
2.	"Filth Pig"	Jourgensen, Barker	6:20
3.	"Lava"	Jourgensen, Barker	6:30
4.	"Crumbs"	Jourgensen, Barker, Mike Scaccia, Rey Washam, Louis Svitek	4:15
5.	"Useless"	Jourgensen, Barker, Scaccia, William Rieflin	5:55
6.	"Dead Guy"	Jourgensen, Barker, Washam	5:15
7.	"Game Show"	Jourgensen, Barker, Scaccia, Washam, Svitek	7:46
8.	"The Fall"	Jourgensen, Michael Balch	4:55
9.	"Lay Lady Lay" (Bob Dylan cover)	Bob Dylan	5:44
10.	"Brick Windows"	Jourgensen, Barker	5:23
Total length:			54:24

== Personnel ==
=== Ministry ===
- Al Jourgensen – vocals, guitars, keyboards, mandolin, harmonica, pedal steel, piano, production
- Paul Barker – bass, vocals (5), programming, production

=== Additional personnel ===
- Rey Washam – drums
- Louis Svitek – guitars
- Mike Scaccia – guitars
- William Rieflin – drums
- Esther Nevarez – backing vocals
- Duane Buford – programming (uncredited)
- Stella Katsoudas – backing vocals (5)
- Michael Balch – programming (8, uncredited)

=== Technicial personnel ===
- Zlatko Hukic – engineer
- Brad Kopplin – engineer
- Bill Garcelon – assistant engineer
- Jamie Duffy – assistant engineer
- Matt Gibson – assistant engineer
- Ed Tinley – assistant engineer
- Whitney O'Keefe – assistant engineer
- Paul Elledge – art, design

== Chart positions ==
Album

Chart (1996)	Peak position
Australian Albums (ARIA)	9
Austrian Albums (Ö3 Austria)	47
Finnish Albums (Suomen virallinen lista)	17
German Albums (Offizielle Top 100)	28
New Zealand Albums (RMNZ)	16
Norwegian Albums (VG-lista)	38
Scottish Albums (Official Charts)	63
Swedish Albums (Sverigetopplistan0	7
Swiss Albums (Schweizer Hitparade)	50
UK Albums (OCC)	43
US Billboard 200	19

Singles

Year	Song	US Dance	SWE	UK
1995	"The Fall"	18	46	53
1996	"Lay Lady Lay"	—	—	128
