= Psalm 69: The Way to Succeed and the Way to Suck Eggs =

1992 studio album by Ministry

ΚΕΦΑΛΗΞΘ

Studio album by Ministry
- Released: July 14, 1992
- Recorded: 1991–1992
- Studios: Chicago Trax Studios (Chicago); Royal Recorders (Lake Geneva)
- Genres: Industrial metal; thrash metal
- Length: 44:41
- Label: Sire
- Producers: Hypo Luxa; Hermes Pan

Ministry chronology
In Case You Didn't Feel Like Showing Up (1990)	ΚΕΦΑΛΗΞΘ (1992)	Filth Pig (1996)

Singles from Psalm 69
- 1. "Jesus Built My Hotrod" Released: November 5, 1991; 2. "N.W.O." Released: July 1992; 3. "Just One Fix" Released: January 21, 1993

ΚΕΦΑΛΗΞΘ (commonly known as Psalm 69: The Way to Succeed and the Way to Suck Eggs or simply Psalm 69) is the fifth studio album by American industrial metal band Ministry, released on July 14, 1992, by Sire Records. It was produced by frontman Al Jourgensen and bassist Paul Barker, and was recorded from March 1991 to May 1992 in Chicago, Illinois, and Lake Geneva, Wisconsin. The album's title, initially intended to be The Tapes of Wrath, ended up being derived from Aleister Crowley's The Book of Lies.

Psalm 69 features elements of speed metal, rockabilly, and psychobilly, with lyrics exploring social, political, and religious topics. With much anticipation following the success of Ministry's previous album The Mind Is a Terrible Thing to Taste (1989), pressures on the band were said to be high, in addition to the growing substance abuse of several members and worsening relationships between them. It was also the first time Mike Scaccia had been significantly involved in a Ministry album, after appearing on tours in support of The Mind....

Preceded by lead single "Jesus Built My Hotrod", Psalm 69 was a critical and commercial success upon its release, peaking at number 27 on the US Billboard 200 and number 33 on the UK Albums Chart. It was supported by two more singles: "N.W.O." and "Just One Fix", with accompanying music videos directed by Peter Christopherson. Psalm 69 is considered to be Ministry's most successful album, having been certified gold in Canada and Australia, and platinum in the US. Following its release, Ministry joined the second annual Lollapalooza tour before commencing a tour through Europe and the US; "N.W.O.", "Just One Fix", and the title track have become permanent features of the band's live setlist. "N.W.O." was nominated for the Best Metal Performance at the 35th Annual Grammy Awards.

== Background and recording ==
In March 1991, following the conclusion of the year-long tour in support of Revolting Cocks album Beers, Steers, and Queers, Ministry's frontman Jourgensen returned with his bandmates (including Barker and long-time drummer Bill Rieflin, both of whom appeared on the previous two Ministry albums) at Chicago Trax! studios, to work on Ministry's next major release. Jourgensen claimed that the record company Warner Bros. Records (to which Ministry were signed via their subsidiary Sire Records) initially gave the band an enormous budget (Note: In 2013, Jourgensen claimed that Psalm 69's initial budget was $750,000, with $750,000 added during further production. Contemporaneous 1990s articles on Ministry estimated Psalm 69's overall bill being three times over budget, with $329,000 being spent.) expecting a follow-up to The Mind... to become a big hit compared with Michael Jackson's album Thriller. In actuality, Jourgensen, his then-wife Patty (née Marsh), and guitarist Scaccia spent most of the budget on drugs; Jourgensen later claimed in 2013 that they were paying about $1,000 per day. Meanwhile, the first Lollapalooza tour had arrived in Chicago in early August 1991. Jourgensen went backstage attending a show by the band Butthole Surfers. After the gig, he had invited Butthole Surfers' singer Gibby Haynes to Chicago Trax! to record what became the vocals and spoken word parts for the song "Jesus Built My Hotrod". While finishing "Jesus Built My Hotrod", Jourgensen was contacted by Sire/Warner Bros. executives, who asked if he had any completed material. Jourgensen sent them "Jesus Built My Hotrod" since it was the only song recorded by this time. While the label was not happy with just having "Jesus Built My Hotrod", Jourgensen told them either to give another advance for further work or sign the band off. The label was doubtful if the band would record anything else, but decided to release "Jesus Built My Hotrod". The single ultimately became a commercial and critical success, surprising the label; it peaked at No. 19 on the Alternative Airplay chart and had sold over 100,000 copies by mid-1992. Afterwards, Sire gave the band a larger budget, with the condition that the band would eventually finish the record.

Besides drug problems, there was also growing animosity between the band's members, divided into two groups. The first group included Jourgensen, Scaccia, and guest/studio keyboardist Michael Balch. The other group was dubbed "the Book Club" by Jourgensen, and it included Barker, Rieflin, and guest/live singer Chris Connelly. Jourgensen claimed that he and Scaccia added their parts separately from Barker, Rieflin, and Connelly; once Jourgensen and Scaccia would come in, they erased about 80 percent of what the Book Club associates did. Additional tensions arose between Jourgensen and Balch during the album's sessions, and the latter relocated back to his home city of Vancouver before the album's completion. Other notable individuals who contributed to Psalm 69 included guitarist Louis Svitek (who joined Ministry as touring guitarist afterwards), programmer Howie Beno, engineer Jeff Newell, and Haynes. Ultimately, all six individuals in the aforementioned two split groups were credited as songwriters (along with Beno and Haynes on one song each).

The last songs included for the album, the instrumental tracks "Corrosion" and "Grace", were written mainly by Barker and recorded in February–March 1992; the album's last session was held on May 7, 1992. Over 15 months were spent on the recording; however, only nine of about 30 songs made its way onto the final cut, with the rest being distributed to side projects.

== Etymology ==
The title of the album is linked to chapter 69 of The Book of Lies, a written work of Aleister Crowley, where he uses the expression "The way to succeed and the way to suck eggs" as a pun for the 69 sex position ("suck seed" and "suck eggs"). Moreover, Crowley titled the chapter ΚΕΦΑΛΗΞΘ (which translates literally as "shrugged" and contains the sound ΛΗΞ "licks") but has a second meaning as a compound of Greek κεφαλη ("head") and Ξ Θ (an encoded alphabetic reference to "69") which both have slang meanings in English for sexual acts.

Subsequent to the album's release, Ministry put multiple references to the number 69 in future albums. For example, the albums Dark Side of the Spoon and Houses of the Molé both have hidden tracks at track #69. A further reference to the number was exhibited on Houses of the Molé with a hidden track at #23 titled "Psalm 23", one third of 69.

== Cover art ==
The cover art depicts a silhouette of an angel surrounded by clocks and other miscellaneous objects as border icons. It was designed by photographer Paul Elledge who conceived the layout after Jourgensen handed him a copy of Aleister Crowley's 1918 The Book of Lies. The final cover image was a triple exposure of three images on one piece of film. The angel was a model from Chicago's Art Institute, who was wearing angel wings crafted by the artist's wife at the time. It took Elledge a week to complete the cover art.

== Reception ==
Professional ratings
Review scores
Source	Rating
AllMusic	4.5/5 stars
Encyclopedia of Popular Music	4/5 stars
Entertainment Weekly	A−
Los Angeles Times	4/4 stars
NME	8/10
Q	3/5 stars
Rolling Stone	3.5/5 stars
The Rolling Stone Album Guide	4/5 stars
Spin Alternative Record Guide	8/10
The Village Voice	A−

Psalm 69 was ranked No. 80 on the Rolling Stone's "Top 100 Greatest Metal Albums of All Time" list, with author Suzy Exposito concluding that "the result of the album was a manic drag race into a swampy hellmouth of thrash Americana – and it worked". The album was also included in the book 1001 Albums You Must Hear Before You Die. In 2001, Q named it one of the "50 Heaviest Albums of All Time".

== Accolades ==
"N.W.O." was nominated for the Grammy Award for Best Metal Performance at the Grammy Awards of 1993, but lost to Nine Inch Nails' "Wish".

== Legacy ==
Video game composer Frank Klepacki cited Psalm 69 album as a primary influence in creating the soundtrack for the 1995 video game Command & Conquer.

== Track listing ==
All songs credited to Ministry, except noted. Writing credits taken from ASCAP and BMI databases.

No.	Title	Writer(s)	Length
1.	"N.W.O."	Al Jourgensen; Paul Barker	5:31
2.	"Just One Fix"	Jourgensen; Barker; Bill Rieflin; Michael Balch	5:11
3.	"TV II"	Jourgensen; Barker; Rieflin; Mike Scaccia; Chris Connelly	3:04
4.	"Hero"	Jourgensen; Barker; Rieflin	4:13
5.	"Jesus Built My Hotrod" (featuring Gibby Haynes)	Jourgensen; Barker; Rieflin; Balch; Gibby Haynes	4:51
6.	"Scare Crow"	Jourgensen; Barker; Rieflin; Balch; Scaccia	8:21
7.	"Psalm 69"	Jourgensen; Barker	5:29
8.	"Corrosion"	Jourgensen; Barker	4:56
9.	"Grace"	Jourgensen; Barker; Howie Beno	3:05

== Charts and certifications ==
=== Album ===
Chart (1992)	Peak position
Australian Albums (ARIA)	54
German Albums (Offizielle Top 100)	69
New Zealand Albums (RMNZ)	24
UK Albums (OCC)	33
US Billboard 200	27

=== Singles ===
Song (1992)	US Alt.	US Dance	UK
"Jesus Built My Hotrod"	19	34	—
"N.W.O."	11	—	49

=== Certifications ===
Year	Country	Award	Copies sold
1992	Canada	Gold	50,000
1993	United States	Gold	500,000
1995	United States	Platinum	1,000,000
2006	Australia	Gold	35,000

== Personnel ==
Credits adapted from the liner notes of the album.

Ministry

- Al Jourgensen – vocals (all tracks except "Jesus Built My Hotrod" and instrumentals), guitars, keyboards, production
- Paul Barker – vocals, bass, programming, production

Additional personnel

- Gibby Haynes – vocals and lyrics (on "Jesus Built My Hotrod")
- Mike Scaccia – guitars
- Louis Svitek – guitars
- Michael Balch – keyboards, programming
- Howie Beno – programming
- William Rieflin – drums

Technical personnel

- Jeff "Critter" Newell – engineer
- Paul Manno – engineer
- Tom Baker – mastering
- Paul Elledge – artwork
- Dale Lavi – photography
- "Thirst" – artwork assistant
