= Jesus Built My Hotrod =

Song by Ministry

Single by Ministry

from the album Psalm 69: The Way to Succeed and the Way to Suck Eggs
- B-side: "TV Song"
- Released: November 5, 1991
- Recorded: 1991
- Studio: Chicago Trax! Studios (Chicago, IL)
- Genre: Industrial metal; speed metal; thrash metal
- Length: 4:51
- Label: Sire; Warner Bros.
- Songwriters: Al Jourgensen; Paul Barker; Michael Balch; Gibby Haynes; Bill Rieflin
- Producers: Hypo Luxa; Hermes Pan

Ministry singles chronology
"So What" (1990)	"Jesus Built My Hotrod" (1991)	"N.W.O." (1992)

Music video
- "Jesus Built My Hotrod" on YouTube

"Jesus Built My Hotrod" is a song by American industrial metal band Ministry, released as the first single from their fifth studio album, Psalm 69: The Way to Succeed and the Way to Suck Eggs. It was written by the band's frontman Al Jourgensen, bassist Paul Barker, drummer Bill Rieflin, session keyboardist Michael Balch, and guest vocalist Gibby Haynes of the Butthole Surfers, and was co-produced by Jourgensen and Barker. An industrial metal track with a polyrhythmic structure, the song also features elements of rockabilly and psychobilly, and is influenced by the Trashmen 1963 hit "Surfin' Bird", and Flannery O'Connor's novel Wise Blood.

The song was first released as a single in November 1991, backed with the B-side "TV Song" based on lyrics by Chris Connelly; re-edited versions of both tracks were included in Psalm 69, as well as various compilation albums. The single reached No. 19 in the Billboard Modern Rock Tracks chart with approximately 128,000 copies as of mid-July 1992, preceding the later success of Psalm 69.

== Background ==
Stories regarding the song's recording, given in various accounts over the years, (Note: Accounts regarding the recording of "Jesus Built My Hotrod"—including these given by Jourgensen, Barker and Haynes—were featured in multiple publications, ranging from the 1990s to the 2010s.) hold that the first Lollapalooza tour, with Butthole Surfers featured in its lineup, came to Chicago to perform in Summer 1991. After the Surfers' performance, lead singer Gibby Haynes visited the Chicago Trax! studios. There, Ministry frontman Al Jourgensen asked Haynes if he could record vocals for the song, then only featuring guitar and drum parts with no vocals, mainly due to its beat structure. While alleged to be drunk at this point, Haynes had been performing his parts for some time, before falling asleep.

As Jourgensen later explained, he spent about two or three weeks at home after that session, editing the tapes on a two-track recorder in order to render Haynes' performance as somewhat listenable. He then overdubbed additional instrumental parts, samples from drag racing competitions and tape noises. In the end, Jourgensen and bandmates added a spoken-word intro to fit Haynes' "moronic" singing. Around the same time, guitarist Mike Scaccia and drummer Bill Rieflin had recorded a demo of themselves playing as fast as they could; initially conceived as a joke, it became the single's flipside, "TV Song".

After he finished editing, Jourgensen was contacted by Sire Records about getting new recorded material for the next album. Left with little choice, Jourgensen sent in a tape of "Jesus Built My Hotrod", since it was the only song he had by this time. Sire staff were irritated with only having "Jesus Built My Hotrod" to release, and as well that most of an advance, initially intended for the record, were spent by Jourgensen and his acquaintances on drugs. Jourgensen told them to either release the song and pay another advance, or terminate the contract. The label chose to release the song, with no further expectations from the band.

== Music and lyrical themes ==
"Jesus Built My Hotrod" is an industrial metal, speed metal, thrash metal, and alternative metal song with elements of rockabilly and psychobilly; on Psalm 69, it is the fifth track with a length of four minutes and fifty-one seconds. (Note: The extended single version of the song—styled "Redline/Whiteline Version"—is approximately eight minutes and fifteen seconds long, while the shortened one, styled "Short, Pusillanimous, So-They-Can-Fit-More-Commercials-On-The-Radio Edit", is three minutes and forty-five seconds long.) The track was written by Al Jourgensen, Paul Barker, Bill Rieflin, and Michael Balch with lyrics credited to Gibby Haynes, and was co-produced by Jourgensen and Barker under their respective aliases, Hypo Luxa and Hermes Pan.

In a 2011 interview, Jourgensen said that the song was partially inspired by his youth experiences with his stepfather, a stock car driver and mechanic. Commenting on Ministry's work for Spin Alternative Record Guide, writer Eric Weisbard likened it to "an updated, theorized" version of the Trashmen 1963 hit "Surfin' Bird"; AllMusic’s editor Steve Huey supports this point in the song review.

The song begins with a spoken word intro, which refers to Jerry Lee Lewis as "the devil" and Jesus Christ as "an architect previous to his career as a prophet". In the "Redline/Whiteline Version", it is followed by sampled lines of Hazel Motes (portrayed by Brad Dourif) from the 1979 film Wise Blood before cutting immediately into the main section, which contains Haynes' scat-like singing set to the drum beat performed in common time signature (4/4) with guitar riff—attributed to Jourgensen and repeated throughout most of the song. The "Redline/Whiteline Version" also features a sampled line of Frank Booth (portrayed by Dennis Hopper) from David Lynch’s 1986 film Blue Velvet, as well as dialogues from drag race competitions. The song ends with another spoken word part, saying: "Jesus built my car / it's a love affair / mainly Jesus and my hot rod."

== Release and reception ==
Professional ratings
Review scores
Source	Rating
AllMusic	3/5 stars

"Jesus Built My Hotrod" was released on November 7, 1991, little more than half a year before it appeared on Psalm 69, in three formats (vinyl records, CD and CS), with promo copies accompanied by a free quart of motor oil. It was quickly successful, which was said to be unexpected by commentators including Jourgensen. As of mid-July 1992, "Jesus Built My Hotrod" sold 128,000 copies, and was considered one of Warner Bros.' best-selling CD singles along with Depeche Mode's "Personal Jesus" and Madonna's "Vogue" in October 1992. In 2013, Jourgensen claimed that the single sold over 1.5 million copies worldwide.

The song has received significant critical acclaim. In a short review for AllMusic, John Book gave the single three of five stars, praising Jourgensen's guitar performance, while his fellow editor Steve Huey hailed it as one of Ministry's "best-known songs". Writing for the Los Angeles Times, Robert Hilburn called the song "a guaranteed classic".

Despite being a fan favorite, "Jesus Built My Hotrod" was not featured during the Psalm 69 tours, to some authors' wondering; it wasn't until 1999 when the song made appearance during the Dark Side of the Spoon tour, since present in Ministry's live setlist during the 2000s and the 2010s. In the November 2008 issue of Guitar World, Jourgensen explains that as he doesn't "have [his] heart into it," he wouldn't perform it without Haynes.

=== Artwork and music video ===
The front cover for the single was designed by Paul Elledge, who also did the artwork for Psalm 69. In a 2013 interview Elledge said that Jourgensen and Barker, infatuated with a Chrysler Hemi engine, had favored idea of having "a super-industrial shot of an engine that was kind of like what you would see at a factory, not on an album cover." Instead of taking a photo of an engine, Elledge requested it from Chrysler representatives.

The accompanying video for the song was also directed by Elledge himself. The band convinced the Warner Bros. representatives to shoot the video with Elledge, despite the latter having no experience in filming. Elledge listened to the song 100 times or more, before creating a storyboard. Commenting on the shoot, Elledge said that he wanted "to make it so that some things I shot people would think was stock (footage) and some things that were stock were things I shot". Elledge spent three days shooting the band and others featured in the video, as well as doing the animation. From three takes, the final cut was edited in six weeks.

The official video, uploaded on October 27, 2009, to the Warner Records Vault channel on YouTube, has been edited so that the opening lyrics say:

Soon I discovered that this rock thing was true
JESUS was the Devil
All of a sudden, I found myself in love with the world

== Legacy ==
=== Later recordings ===
The album version of the song is in Ministry's 2001 compilation album Greatest Fits; remixed and re-recorded versions appear on several Ministry compilations, including 2005's Rantology, 2008's Cover Up, 2010's Every Day Is Halloween: The Anthology/Undercover and 2011's The Very Best of Fixes and Remixes. For the Rantology version, subtitled "Update Mix", a new introduction was recorded by Haynes. The song's lyrics have been supposedly recycled for Butthole Surfers' 1993 song "Some Dispute Over T-Shirt Sales", from Independent Worm Saloon.

Notable cover versions of the song were recorded by The Bosshoss (for their 2006 album Rodeo Rodeo) and Lamb of God (for 2018 cover album Legion: XX, as Burn the Priest). Commenting on the Lamb of God recording, frontman Randy Blythe admitted that he didn't consider it a good idea, until he performed vocals; instead of requesting permissions for the original cut's samples, the band chose to voice these themselves. The Burn the Priest version made an appearance on an episode of The Flash. Finnish band Eläkeläiset has recorded a cover version of the song in Finnish as "Niilo Yli-Vainio tervasi potkukelkkani jalakset" ("Niilo Yli-Vainio smeared the runners of my kicksled with tar").

=== Appearances and references in popular culture ===
"Jesus Built My Hotrod" was featured in the first trailer of Seth Grahame-Smith's 2009 parody book Pride and Prejudice and Zombies.

A lyric from the spoken word intro ("Ding a ding dang my dang a long ling long") was used (without spaces) as a cheat code in the video game Sleepwalker. In August 2010, the song became available for download in the Rock Band series of games. The song was also featured in the 2014 Ubisoft video game Watch Dogs, both as a song available in game, and as a diegetic backdrop for a set piece during the game's storyline; one reviewer called it a "fantastic moment". The song was also featured in the 2008 racing game MotorStorm: Pacific Rift. The song was featured in an August 25, 2026 game trailer for PUBG: DED.NET.

== Track listing ==
No.	Title	Credits	Length
1.	"Jesus Built My Hotrod" (Redline/Whiteline Version)	Jourgensen; Rieflin; Balch; Haynes	8:15
2.	"Jesus Built My Hotrod" (Short, Pusillanimous, So-They-Can-Fit-More-Commercials-On-The-Radio Edit)		3:45
3.	"TV Song"	Barker; Rieflin; Scaccia; Connelly	3:12

== Personnel ==
Credits adapted from liner notes of the "Jesus Built My Hotrod" single, Psalm 69: The Way to Succeed and the Way to Suck Eggs and Greatest Fits.

Ministry

- Al Jourgensen – lead and slide guitar, vocals on "TV Song" (uncredited), programming, production
- Paul Barker – bass, programming, production

Additional personnel

- Bill Rieflin – drums, programming
- Michael Balch – programming on "Jesus Built My Hotrod"
- Gibby Haynes – vocals and lyrics on "Jesus Built My Hotrod"
- Mike Scaccia – guitar
- Chris Connelly – lyrics on "TV Song"
- Critter Newell – engineer
- Howie "Ice Ice" Beno – editing
- Paul Elledge – artwork

== Accolades ==
Year	Publication	Country	Accolade	Rank	Ref.
2003	Martin Popoff	Canada	The Top 500 Heavy Metal Songs of All Time	375	
2004	Kerrang!	United Kingdom	"666 Songs You Must Own (Alternative Rock)"	10	
2006	The A.V. Club	United States	"The A.V. Club's Definitive Mixlist: The New Adventures Of Jesus"	12	
2013	Diffuser.fm	United States	"10 Best Ministry Songs"	2	
2014	Ultimate Classic Rock	United States	"Top 10 Jesus Songs"	11	
2016	Metal Hammer	United Kingdom	"The Top 10 Best Ministry Songs"	3	
2017	Metal Hammer	United Kingdom	"The 100 best metal songs of the 90s"	30	
"*" denotes an unordered list.

== Chart performance ==
Weekly charts

Chart (1992)	Peak position
Australia (ARIA)	134
US Alternative Airplay (Billboard)	19
US Dance/Electronic Singles Sales (Billboard)	37

Year-end charts

Chart (1992)	Peak position
Festive 50 (John Peel)	3
