= Hate to Go – Take Out or Delivery =

Studio album by Ministry
- Released: October 30, 2026
- Genre: Industrial metal
- Length: 46:44
- Label: Cleopatra
- Producer: Al Jourgensen

Ministry chronology
The Squirrely Years Revisited (2025)	Hate to Go – Take Out or Delivery (2026)

Hate to Go – Take Out or Delivery is the seventeenth and final studio album by American industrial metal band Ministry, released on October 30, 2026, by Cleopatra Records. It was produced by frontman Al Jourgensen and is the only studio album to feature Pepe Clarke on drums. The album also includes a guest appearance from multi-instrumentalist Paul Barker, who appears on a Ministry album for the first time in 23 years.

== Background ==
In January 2024, Jourgensen confirmed in an interview with Metal Hammer Germany that Ministry intended to release one final album and then disband, later also declaring in conversation with Loudwire, "I think it's a good time to stop." The band entered the studio in June 2024 to begin work on their seventeenth studio album, and confirmed that same month they were reuniting with multi-instrumentalist Paul Barker 21 years after the latter's departure. Originally, the plan was to have him contribute the whole album for "nostalgia sake," but after realizing both Jourgensen and Barker's musical tastes have changed over the years ("[Barker] was always the more atmospheric guy, I was always the more metal guy"), they decided to cowrite only one song, which is "We're Still Here."

In July 2024, Roy Mayorga took a hiatus from the band to join Jerry Cantrell on tour and was replaced by KYNG and Strife drummer Pepe Clarke who continues to play with the band. On October 7, 2024, Ministry announced that they were signed to Cleopatra Records for the release of their final studio album.

== Release and promotion ==
On July 24, 2026, Ministry announced that seventeenth and final studio album, Hate to Go – Take Out or Delivery, was due for release on October 30, 2026, supported by the album's lead single "Burned Out". The band will tour in support of the album, including embarking on the "Goodbye Europe" tour in April and May 2027.

== Track listing ==
All lyrics are written by by Al Jourgensen, except where noted:

Hate to Go – Take Out or Delivery track listing
No.	Title	Music	Length
1.	"Crickets"	Al Jourgensen, Monte Pittman	3:36
2.	"Voices of Hate"	Al Jourgensen, Cesar Soto	4:16
3.	"Clown Car"	Al Jourgensen, Cesar Soto	4:01
4.	"We Hate"	Al Jourgensen, Monte Pittman	5:28
5.	"Delete"	Al Jourgensen	3:39
6.	"Grifter"	Al Jourgensen	6:36
7.	"The White Man Lied"	Al Jourgensen, Cesar Soto	4:26
8.	"Singularity"	Al Jourgensen, Cesar Soto	4:11
9.	"Burned Out"	Al Jourgensen, Monte Pittman	6:04
10.	"We're Still Here"	Al Jourgensen	4:27
Total length:			46:44

== Personnel ==
=== Ministry ===
- Al Jourgensen – vocals, guitars (1-4, 6-9), programming (1-3, 5, 7-9), lead guitar (2), keyboards (4, 6), bass (6)
- Cesar Soto – guitars (2, 3, 5-7, 9), bass (2, 3, 5, 7), lead guitar (7)
- Monte Pittman – guitars (1, 4, 8), bass (1, 4, 8), lead guitar (2, 3, 4)
- Paul D'Amour – guitars (6)
- John Bechdel – keyboards (1)
- Pepe Clarke – drums

=== Additional musicians ===
- Josh Bradford – backing vocals (1, 8, 9), add. programming (8)
- Dez Cuchiara – backing vocals (3, 6, 9)
- Badpenny Von Eckardt – backing vocals (4, 6, 9)
- Devix Szell – backing vocals (9)
- Paul Barker – bass (9), keyboards (9)

== Charts ==
Chart performance for Hate to Go – Take Out or Delivery
Chart (2026)	Peak position
German Albums (Offizielle Top 100)	91
Swiss Albums (Schweizer Hitparade)	63
UK Albums Sales (Official Charts)	87
UK Independent Albums (Official Charts)	32
UK Rock & Metal Albums (Official Charts)	16
US Top Album Sales (Billboard)	32
