= The Fall (Ministry song) =

Song by Ministry

Single by Ministry

from the album Filth Pig
- Released: December 1995
- Recorded: 1994–1995
- Length: 4:54
- Label: Sire; Warner Bros.
- Songwriters: Al Jourgensen; Michael Balch
- Producers: Hypo Luxa; Hermes Pan

Ministry singles chronology
"Just One Fix" (1993)	"The Fall" (1995)	"Lay Lady Lay" (1996)

"The Fall" is a song from American industrial metal band Ministry. It was the first single from the band's sixth studio album, Filth Pig. The single hit number eighteen on the Billboard Dance chart. It reached number 53 in the UK.

== Track listing ==
Writing credits taken from BMI

No.	Title	Writer(s)	Length
1.	"The Fall"	Al Jourgensen, Michael Balch	4:54
2.	"Reload" (12 Inch Mix)	Jourgensen, Paul Barker	3:28
3.	"TV III"	Jourgensen, Barker	5:00
