= With Sympathy =

Studio album by Ministry
- Released: May 10, 1983
- Recorded: November 1982–March 1983
- Studio: Syncro Sound (Boston)
- Genres: New wave; synth-pop; techno-rock
- Length: 37:39; 55:59 (2012 re-release)
- Label: Arista
- Producers: Vince Ely; Ian Taylor

Ministry chronology
With Sympathy (1983)	Twitch (1986)

Singles from With Sympathy
- 1. "Work for Love" Released: January 1983; 2. "I Wanted to Tell Her" Released: April 1983; 3. "Revenge" Released: September 1983

With Sympathy is the debut studio album by American industrial band Ministry, released on May 10, 1983, by Arista Records. The group was formed in 1981 by lead singer and multi-instrumentalist Al Jourgensen, with drummer Stephen George being the most notable member of its initial lineup. The album was briefly re-released overseas as Work for Love.

== Background and recording ==
In late 1981, Jourgensen was living in Chicago and involved in its underground scene. He began to write and record songs in his apartment, using a newly bought ARP Omni synthesizer, a drum machine and a reel-to-reel tape recorder. At one point, a demo tape featuring the song "I'm Falling" gained the attention of Wax Trax! Records label co-founder and co-owner Jim Nash. Impressed by the demo, Nash offered to record its material professionally and to assemble the touring band, which Jourgensen named Ministry. At Chicago's Hedden West Studios, Jourgensen, with co-producers Jay O'Roarke and Iain Burgess, recorded Ministry's first material, a 12" single featuring the tracks "I'm Falling", "Primental" and "Cold Life".

Jourgensen assembled the band's first live lineup, a five-piece group including Jourgensen on vocals and guitar, bassist Martin Sorenson, keyboardists Robert Roberts and John Davis, and drummer Stephen George. Jourgensen and Roberts state that Roberts' inclusion in the group occurred because their mutual friend Paul Taylor was ill and unable to join.

While touring the Midwest and the Northeast during 1982, Ministry received some commercial success with "Cold Life." The band gained the attention of Arista label executives, who chose to sign them. With Sympathy was recorded in Autumn 1982 with producers Vince Ely and Ian Taylor at the Syncro Sound recording studio in Boston.

== Critical reception ==
Professional ratings
Review scores
Source	Rating
AllMusic	2.5/5 stars
Encyclopedia of Popular Music	2/5 stars
I-Mockery	4.5/5 stars
MusicHound Rock	2.5/5 stars
Rolling Stone	3/5 stars
Spin Alternative Record Guide	3/10

On release, With Sympathy received mixed to negative reviews. However, Rolling Stone noted that any lack of originality in the synth-pop concept was "... hardly worth complaining about, because Ministry manages to do something many far more innovative bands neglect: they write catchy dance songs." The review further observed that Jourgensen's singing was "... charged with anger, passion and glee–real emotions instead of the vocal posturing so common in synth-pop." The album achieved commercial success, peaking at number 94 in the Billboard 200 and selling more than 100,000 copies in the US by 2007. The album was promoted with three singles: "Work for Love", "I Wanted to Tell Her", and "Revenge". "I Wanted to Tell Her" was re-recorded with the then-current lineup of the band (frontman Jourgensen, drummer George, keyboardists Roberts and Mark Pothier, and bassist Brad Hallen). This version was used on some overseas copies of the album. A music video was made for the single "Revenge". Ministry also went on a three-month tour to promote the album.

=== Retrospective impressions by Al Jourgensen ===
Following the tour's completion, Jourgensen's dissatisfaction over his record deal led the band to depart Arista in early 1984. Jourgensen later disowned the album, maintaining that he had been pressured by Arista management into the then-popular synth-pop style, which is in contrast to the harder industrial and heavy metal sounds that he would later develop. He compared the experience to that of Milli Vanilli. Jourgensen has described the album as a "sonic abortion". He also claims that Arista had prevented songs that he had written in 1982 from appearing on the album; these tracks would eventually appear on The Land of Rape and Honey and Twitch.

However, according to Ian MacKaye, with whom Jourgensen formed Pailhead, Jourgensen discovered hardcore music after his synth-pop work, a statement that Jourgensen repeated in the documentary film Industrial Accident: The Story of Wax Trax! Records. Former keyboardist Robert Roberts refutes claims that Jourgensen was forced by Arista to "make the record cheesy," that the finished product was simply watered down and did not properly capture the band's live sound. Additionally, video recordings of Ministry concerts in Chicago several years before their signing with Arista show the band playing synth-pop and dressed in new wave and dark wave styles.

Jourgensen's disdain for the album led him to make a comment that he would only sign the album in exchange for $1000. In an interview with Rolling Stone, he said that a fan presented him with the album for him to sign along with the $1000. Although surprised, he honored his promise and signed the album in exchange for the money. Jourgensen also stated that he donated the money to Rock for Kids, a Chicago-based charity event, and should anyone else pay him to sign the album, he would continue to donate the money to Rock for Kids.

Jourgensen assumes a false English accent for all of the songs, for which he later expressed regret. His ex-wife Patty stated in 2013 that doing so was an homage to bands that he had liked.

Jourgensen has since made peace with the album, saying in 2016 that "... because of that record I wouldn't be who I am today. I think without that record, I wouldn't be as much of a fucking maniac douchebag. So I'm thankful for it now."

In June 2023, Jourgensen announced that Ministry would re-record four tracks from With Sympathy: "Revenge", "Effigy", "Work for Love", and "Here We Go". The new versions are "a lot more guitar-driven, but not metal."

On August 24, 2023, Ministry performed "Revenge" live for the first time since 1984 in Dallas, Texas. The song was performed again on August 27, 2023, in West Palm Beach, Florida.

In December 2023, it was announced that Ministry would be performing at the 2024 Cruel World Festival with a setlist consisting of songs from both With Sympathy and Twitch. The setlist included "Revenge", "Effigy (I'm Not An)" and "Work for Love", the latter two being performed live for the first time since 1984.

On March 28, 2025, Ministry released the compilation album The Squirrely Years Revisited through Cleopatra Records. It contains the songs "Revenge", "Effigy (I'm Not An)", "Here We Go", "Work for Love" all re-recorded along with several other songs from non-album singles and three songs from Twitch.

== Reissue ==
With Sympathy was out of print for many years, and Jourgensen claimed that he had destroyed the master tapes. In 2012, Eastworld Records reissued the album with three bonus tracks.

== Track listing ==
All tracks are written by Alain Jourgensen, except "I Wanted to Tell Her" by Jourgensen and Shay Jones.

With Sympathy — Standard edition
No.	Title	Length
1.	"Effigy (I'm Not An)"	3:51
2.	"Revenge"	3:48
3.	"I Wanted to Tell Her"	5:29
4.	"Work for Love"	4:44
5.	"Here We Go"	3:21
6.	"What He Say"	4:04
7.	"Say You're Sorry"	4:18
8.	"Should Have Known Better"	4:31
9.	"She's Got a Cause"	3:33

With Sympathy — 2012 Eastworld re-release (additional tracks)
No.	Title	Length
10.	"I Wanted to Tell Her" (Extended Mix)	7:03
11.	"Revenge" (Remix)	6:19
12.	"A Walk in the Park"	4:58

Work for Love – European edition
No.	Title	Length
1.	"Work for Love"	4:44
2.	"Do the Etawa"	4:04
3.	"I Wanted to Tell Her"	5:29
4.	"Say You're Sorry"	4:18
5.	"Here We Go"	3:21
6.	"Effigy (I'm Not An)"	3:51
7.	"Revenge"	3:48
8.	"She's Got a Cause"	3:33
9.	"Should Have Known Better"	4:31

- "What He Say" was renamed "Do the Etawa" on the European release.
- The European LP release has the re-recorded single version of "I Wanted to Tell Her" instead of the US album version. All CD versions use the US album version.

== Personnel ==
Credits adapted from the liner notes of With Sympathy. Jourgensen and George are listed as official members of Ministry, although various other individuals were listed as members on the single releases.

=== Ministry ===
- Al Jourgensen – vocals, guitar (1, 3, 4), keyboards, drums (8)
- Stephen George – drums (1–7, 9, 10), percussion (4, 5, 9)
- Robert Roberts – keyboards (2, 3, 4, 9, 10), bass keyboard (4)
- John Davis – keyboards (3, 4, 9)
- Martin Sorenson – bass guitar (3)
- Brad Hallen – bass guitar (5, 6, 10)
- Mark Pothier – keyboards (10)

=== Additional musicians ===
- Marybeth O'Hara – vocals (2, 4)
- Shay Jones – feature vocals (3)
- Walter Turbitt – guitar (3)
- Vince Ely – percussion & keyboards (4)
- Antonia de Portago – vocals (4)
- Ministry of Horns – horns (6)
- Ziv Gidron – chanting (6)
- Doreen Chanter – vocals (7)
- Bob Suber – saxophone (7)

=== Technical staff ===
- Ian Taylor – producer, engineer
- Vince Ely – producer
- David Wooley – engineer
- Flood – engineer
- David Heglmeier – tape operator
- Roger Merritt – tape operator
- Steve Jackson – tape operator
- Greg Calbi – mastering
- Joe Gastwirt – digital remastering (CD edition)

=== Management ===
- Steve Berkowitz – manager
- Elliot Roberts – manager

=== Artwork ===
- Alberto Rizzo – photographer
- David Gahr – inner sleeve photographer
- Brian Shanley – cover concepts
- Jim Nash – cover concepts

== Charts ==
Album

Chart (1984)	Peak position
US Billboard 200	94

Singles

Song (1983)	US Dance	NZ
"Work for Love"	20	—
"I Wanted to Tell Her"	13	35
"Revenge"	—	—

== Bibliography ==
- Jourgensen, Al & Wiederhorn, Jon (July 9, 2013). Ministry: The Lost Gospels According To Al Jourgensen (loan required). Boston, MA: Da Capo Press. ISBN 9780306822186. OCLC 811206550 – via the Internet Archive.
