= Defibrillatour =

2012 concert tour by Ministry

- Concert by Ministry
- Location: North America, Europe
- Start date: June 17, 2012
- End date: August 12, 2012
- No. of shows: 29

Ministry concert chronology
- C-U-LaTour (2008); Defibrillatour (2012)

Defibrillatour (stylized DeFibRilLaTouR) is a 2012 concert tour by the American industrial metal band Ministry in support of their twelfth studio album, Relapse. It was their first tour in four years as well as their first in six years with guitarist Mike Scaccia (as well as their final, due to his death in December 2012).

== Background ==
After Ministry broke up in 2008, frontman Al Jourgensen stated in interviews that a reunion would never happen. In the November 2008 issue of Hustler Magazine, Jourgensen said that the reason they were breaking up was that they "take up so much time" as well as the hassle of getting out new albums. He also said he was responsible for six other bands and could get seven albums done a year while not working on new Ministry material.

On August 7, 2011, it was confirmed that Ministry had reformed and were going to play at Germany's Wacken Open Air festival, set to take place August 2–4, 2012. Later that month, Jourgensen told Metal Hammer that Ministry had begun work on Relapse, which they hope to release by Christmas. Regarding the sound of the new material, he explained, "We've only got five songs to go. I've been listening to it the last couple of weeks and I wasn't really in the mood, I was just taking it as a joke. Just to pass the time at first but [Mikey's] raving about it. It's like, dude c'mon, this is not about Bush, so... that part's over. The ulcers are gone and Bush is gone so it's time for something new. I think this is actually gonna wind up being the fastest and heaviest record I've ever done. Just because we did it as anti-therapy therapy against the country music we would just take days off and thrash faster than I've done in a long time, faster than Mikey's done in a long time. He just did a Rigor Mortis tour and said it was easy compared to this Ministry stuff so it's gonna be brutal and it's gonna freak a lot of people out."

In addition to the Wacken Open Air appearance, the band will play five North American dates and will not be adding any more cities to the Defibrillatour tour, as the band is scheduled to perform at Tuska Open Air Metal Festival in Finland from June 29–July 1, 2012.

== Tour dates ==
=== Completed ===
Date	City	Country	Venue
North America
June 17, 2012	Denver	United States	Ogden Theatre
June 21, 2012	Los Angeles	United States	Club Nokia
June 23, 2012	New York City	United States	Best Buy Theater
June 28, 2012	Chicago	United States	The Vic Theatre
June 29, 2012	Chicago	United States	The Vic Theatre
Europe
July 1, 2012	Helsinki	Finland	Tuska Open Air Metal Festival
July 4, 2012	Oslo	Norway	Rockefeller Music Hall
July 5, 2012	Gävle	Sweden	Getaway Rock Festival
July 7, 2012	Nibe	Denmark	Nibe Festival
July 10, 2012	Leipzig	Germany	Werk 2 / Halle A
July 16, 2012	Bristol	England	O2 Academy
July 17, 2012	Belfast	Northern Ireland	Mandella Hall
July 18, 2012	Dublin	Ireland	Vicar Street
July 20, 2017	London	England	The Forum
July 21, 2017	Manchester	England	Manchester Academy
July 24, 2017	Madrid	Spain	Riviera
July 25, 2012	Bilbao	Spain	Rockstar
July 27, 2012	Sélestat	France	Léz’Arts Scéniques Festival
July 28, 2012	Paris	France	Le Bataclan
July 31, 2012	Lucerne	Switzerland	Konzerthaus Schurr
August 2, 2012	Kostrzyn nad Odrą	Poland	Woodstock Festival Poland
August 4, 2012	Wacken	Germany	Wacken Open Air
August 6, 2012	Munich	Germany	Backstagewerk
August 8, 2012	Budapest	Hungary	Sziget Festival
August 9, 2012	Josefov	Czech Republic	Brutal Assault Festival
August 11, 2012	Moscow	Russia	Moscow Arena
August 12, 2012	Saint Petersburg	Russia	Glav Club

=== Cancelled ===
List of cancelled concerts, showing date, city, country, and venue
Date	City	Country	Venue	Note
July 29, 2012	Étaples	France	Rock en Stock Festival	Cancelled due to Al Jourgensen’s sickness
