= Stephen George (musician) =

American musician

Stephen 'Stevo' George is a former drummer and one of the founding members of the American industrial rock band Ministry. George performed on the band's earliest recordings, including their early singles for the Wax Trax! record label, and their debut album, With Sympathy, released in 1983. After the tour for With Sympathy concluded, George and vocalist/frontman Al Jourgensen were the only remaining members in the band. George subsequently departed in 1985, although he appeared on Ministry's second album, 1986's Twitch, via one track. George eventually became the drummer for the short-lived pop band Colortone. Since then, George has become a successful producer and mixer, working with many pop artists who have sold gold and platinum records.

== Discography ==
- Ric Ocasek – Beatitude (1982)
- Ministry – With Sympathy (1983)
- Elliot Easton – Change No Change (1985)
- Ministry – Twitch (1986)
- Colortone – Colortone (1988)

== Production work ==
- Space Jam Soundtrack (1996) – Engineer, Mixing, Programming
- R. Kelly – R. Kelly (1995) – Engineer, Mixing, Programming
