= Ministry (band) =

American industrial metal band

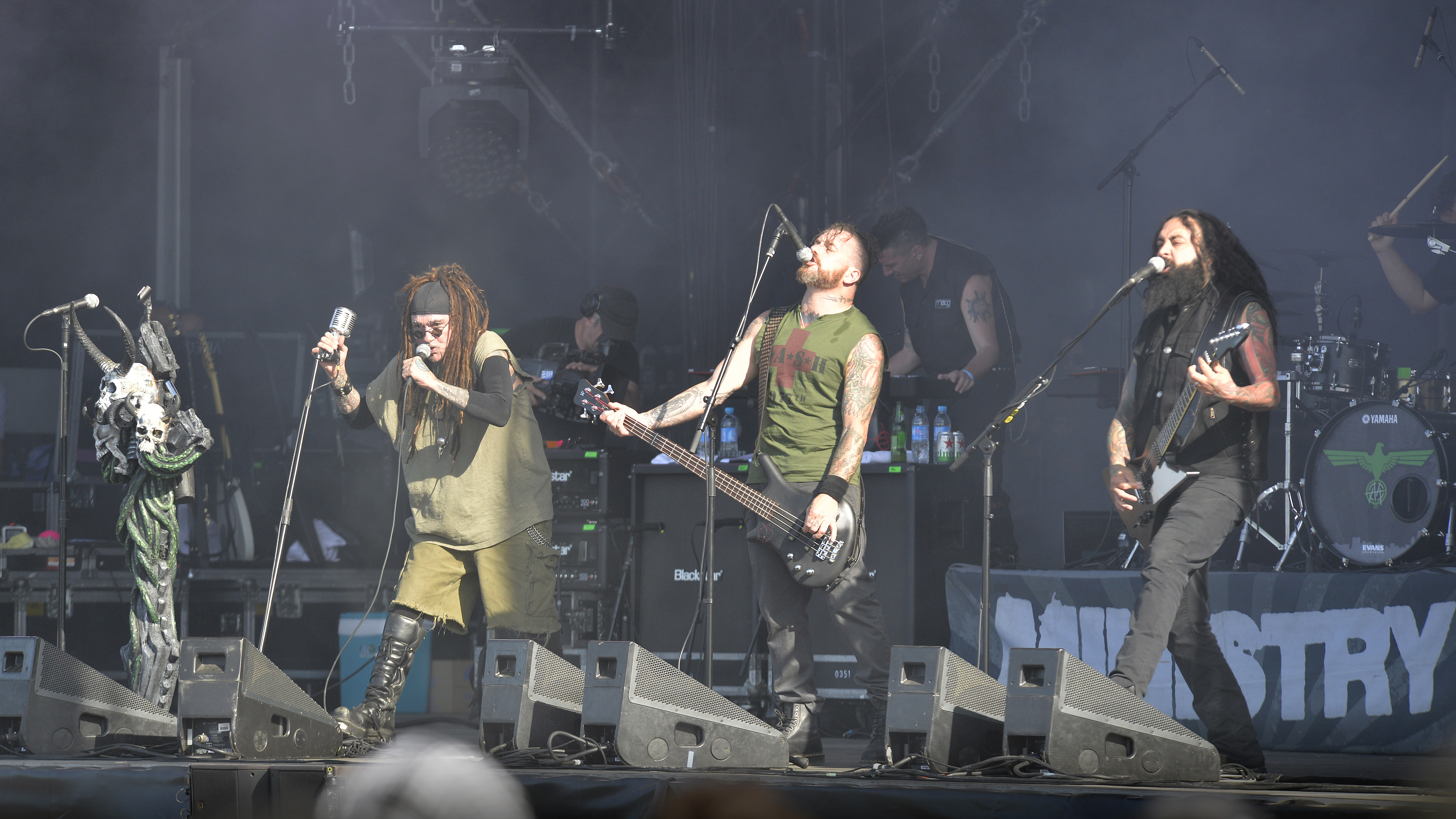
- Ministry at Hellfest in 2017. From left to right: Al Jourgensen, Jason Christopher and Cesar Soto. Keyboardist John Bechdel is in the background.

Background information
- Origin: Chicago, Illinois, U.S.
- Genres: Industrial metal; industrial rock; thrash metal; synth-pop (early)
- Works: Discography
- Years active: 1981–2008; 2011–present
- Labels: Cleopatra; Wax Trax!; Situation Two; Arista; Sire; Warner Bros.; Sanctuary; 13th Planet; Megaforce; Nuclear Blast
- Spinoffs: Revolting Cocks; Lard; 1000 Homo DJs; PTP; Acid Horse; Pailhead; Pigface; Buck Satan and the 666 Shooters
- Spinoff of: Special Affect
- Members: Al Jourgensen; John Bechdel; Cesar Soto; Paul D'Amour; Pepe Clarke; Patrick Houston
- Past members: Stephen George; Robert Roberts; John Davis; Martin Sorenson; John Soroka; Brad Hallen; Mark Pothier; Paul Barker; Bill Rieflin; Chris Connelly; Mike Scaccia; Louis Svitek; Duane Buford; Rey Washam; Zlatko Hukic; Max Brody; Mark Baker; Roy Mayorga; John Monte; Paul Raven; Tommy Victor; Sin Quirin; Tony Campos; Aaron Rossi; Jason Christopher; Derek Abrams; DJ Swamp; Monte Pittman
- Website: ministryband.com

Ministry is an American industrial metal band founded in Chicago, Illinois, in 1981 by producer, singer, and instrumentalist Al Jourgensen. Originally a synth-pop outfit, Ministry evolved into one of the pioneers of industrial rock and industrial metal in the late 1980s. The band's lineup has changed frequently, leaving Jourgensen as the sole remaining original member. Musicians who have contributed to the band's studio and/or live activities include vocalists Nivek Ogre, Chris Connelly, Gibby Haynes, Burton C. Bell and Jello Biafra, guitarists Mike Scaccia, Tommy Victor and Cesar Soto, bassists Paul Barker, Paul Raven, Jason Christopher, Tony Campos and Paul D'Amour, drummers Jimmy DeGrasso, Bill Rieflin, Martin Atkins, Rey Washam, Max Brody, Joey Jordison, Roy Mayorga, Pepe Clarke and Aaron Rossi, keyboardist John Bechdel, and rappers DJ Swamp and Arabian Prince.

Ministry attained commercial success during the late 1980s and early 1990s with three of their studio albums: The Land of Rape and Honey (1988), The Mind Is a Terrible Thing to Taste (1989) and Psalm 69 (1992). The first two were certified gold while Psalm 69 was certified platinum by the RIAA. Psalm 69 was followed by Filth Pig (1996), which was a stylistic departure for the band, and earned Ministry its highest chart position on the Billboard 200 at number nineteen, although it was met with mixed reception by critics and marked the beginning of the band's commercial decline. The lackluster response to their next album, Dark Side of the Spoon (1999), resulted in Warner Bros. dropping Ministry from the label and the group entered an extended hiatus during the early 2000s, when Jourgensen entered rehab after years of substance abuse.

Following Jourgensen's recovery, Ministry resurfaced in 2003 with Animositisomina, which turned out to be their last album with Paul Barker, who would leave the band the same year after nearly two decades as an official member. Ministry returned to the thrash/industrial style of Psalm 69 and released three albums critical of then-President of the United States, George W. Bush, dubbed the "Bush Trilogy": Houses of the Molé (2004), Rio Grande Blood (2006) and The Last Sucker (2007); these albums effectively revitalized the band's commercial viability. Although The Last Sucker was initially intended to be the band's final album, Ministry reformed in 2011 and released Relapse in the following year. On December 23, 2012, longtime guitar contributor Mike Scaccia died of a heart attack, and he was posthumously featured in the next Ministry album, From Beer to Eternity (2013), which was again supposed to be their last album, as Jourgensen thought his death was the end of the band. However, Ministry has since released four more albums, AmeriKKKant (2018), Moral Hygiene (2021), Hopiumforthemasses (2024) and Hate to Go – Take Out or Delivery (2026). The band is set to disband after a final world tour in 2027.

Ministry has been nominated for six Grammy Awards and has performed at several music festivals, including the second annual Lollapalooza tour in 1992, co-headlining Big Day Out in 1995 and performing at Wacken Open Air four times (in 2006, 2012, 2016 and 2025).

== History ==
=== Formation and early days (1981–1982) ===
Ministry's origins date to 1978, when Jourgensen moved from Denver to Chicago to attend the University of Illinois. He was introduced to the local underground scene by his then-girlfriend, and in 1979 he replaced Tom Hoffmann on guitars in Special Affect, a post-punk group which featured vocalist Frank Nardiello (Groovie Mann of My Life with the Thrill Kill Kult), drummer Harry Rushakoff (Concrete Blonde) and bassist Marty Sorenson. Following Special Affect's split in 1980, Jourgensen formed a short-lived band called the Silly Carmichaels, which featured members of the Imports and played two shows.

In 1981, Jourgensen met Jim Nash and Danny Flesher, co-founders and co-owners of the indie record label and shop Wax Trax! Records who recommended him as a touring guitarist for Divine. After playing a few concerts with the latter, Jourgensen began to write and record songs in his apartment, using a newly bought ARP Omni synthesizer, a drum machine, and a reel-to-reel tape recorder. He presented a demo to Jim Nash, who suggested Jourgensen record a single and form a touring band, which Jourgensen decided to call Ministry. (Note: In an article published in the September 1982 issue of Illinois Entertainer, Jourgensen was said to discuss several possible names for the band (including "Fallen Pillar", "Ministry of Fear" and "Ministry of Funk"), before settling on Ministry as it combined "the doom / gloom chromosomes of Fear and the dance feel of Funk." Much later publications has Jourgensen giving a credit to Fritz Lang's 1944 movie Ministry of Fear for inspiring the band's name; AllMusic editor Greg Prato reiterated this point in Jourgensen's profile. In the November 1988 interview for Rockpool, Jourgensen said the name could be interpreted as a reference to government, religion, or other power brokers, and it does not matter which.)

The first line-up of Ministry consisted of keyboardists Robert Roberts and John Davis, bassist Sorenson, and drummer Stephen George; Jourgensen auditioned several singers, all of whom were unsatisfactory, so he decided to perform vocals himself. Nash purchased recording sessions at Hedden West studios which resulted in a twelve-inch single featuring "I'm Falling" and instrumental track "Primental" on the A-side, with the song "Cold Life" on the B-side. (Note: According to Jello Biafra, it was intended to be a seven-inch single featuring the song "Overkill" with the B-side "I'm Falling".) The record was co-produced by Jay O'Roarke and Iain Burgess and released in late 1981 on Wax Trax! in the US. In March 1982, the single was licensed by British label Situation Two, with "Cold Life" as the A-side.

Ministry performed their debut concert on January 1, 1982, in the Chicago club Misfits, and, in the spring, commenced a tour of the Northeast and the Midwest, supporting Medium Medium, A Flock of Seagulls, Culture Club, and Depeche Mode. Meanwhile, the "I'm Falling / Cold Life" single reached No. 45 in the Billboard Hot Dance/Disco chart with approximately 10,000 copies as of September 1982, and thus scoring Wax Trax!' first hit. The songwriter Aimee Mann played with Ministry in the early 1980s.

=== With Sympathy and later Wax Trax! singles (1983–1985) ===
Ministry (Al Jourgensen and Stephen "Stevo" George) during the With Sympathy era

The band's initial success drew the attention of Arista Records founder and chief executive Clive Davis, who offered them a deal, promising to make them "the next Joy Division"—a promise that Jourgensen later considered to be misleading. Signing a six-figure, two-album deal, the band—with Jourgensen and George comprising the official line-up—moved to record at the Syncro Sound studios in Boston, with producers Vince Ely (former drummer of the Psychedelic Furs) and Ian Taylor (former assistant of Roy Thomas Baker), as well as keyboardists Roberts and Davis as session musicians.

Once Jourgensen signed with them, Arista allegedly pressured him to change his image and sound to match that of popular synth-pop acts of the day such as The Human League, Duran Duran, and Depeche Mode. According to Jourgensen, "[t]he label took me to a stylist, cut my hair, picked out my producer. They even wrote lyrics. We opened for Culture Club and the Police. I did it to the best of my ability, but kicking and screaming."

A 12-inch single containing the song "Same Old Madness" was recorded and planned for release, along with its accompanying music video. However, "Same Old Madness"—both the song and video—did not surface until 2014; instead, "Work for Love" was released in January 1983 and peaked No. 20 on the Hot Dance/Disco chart. Ministry's debut album, entitled With Sympathy (also known as Work for Love in Europe), was finished around this time and issued in May, reaching No. 94 in the Billboard 200. On release, the album was supported by two more singles—"Revenge" (with a music video partially reworked from "Same Old Madness") and "I Wanted to Tell Her" (a reworked version of "Primental"). The single release of "I Wanted to Tell Her" was notably re-recorded by the band's then-current lineup. Ministry opened for the Police during a North American leg of the latter's Synchronicity tour. During this time, Jourgensen met the members of Seattle-based band the Blackouts—namely bassist Paul Barker and drummer Bill Rieflin, as well their then-manager Patty Marsh, who later became Jourgensen's wife from 1984 to 1995.

In spite of With Sympathy's success, Jourgensen's relations with Arista were acrimonious. Eventually, Jourgensen sent a demo tape featuring a cover version of Roxy Music's song "Same Old Scene" before parting ways with Arista, suing them for violating contractual obligations. Since then, Jourgensen has expressed dislike for the With Sympathy-era, providing various explanations for his antipathy. In a 2004 interview, Jourgensen said that after signing with Arista, all artistic control of Ministry was "handed over" to other writers and producers. In his 2013 autobiography, Jourgensen said that he was pressured by Arista management into producing his existing songs in the then-popular synthpop style, as a means of making them more commercially palatable. Jourgensen attributed the stylistic change in 2012 to his "development as an artist" and said he was influenced by his time in Europe and collaborations with Wax Trax! artists. He reiterated that his style changed in 2018. In 2019, he stated that the record was "fine", only that it could have been a lot better without interference from the record company. In 2021, Jourgensen repeated his criticism that Arista took full control of the production and songwriting process, changed his wardrobe, and forced him to perform in the style of popular synth pop bands. Jourgensen assumes a false English accent for all of the album's songs, for which he also later expressed great dislike, though Patty Marsh stated in a 2013 interview "...the English accent thing was more an homage to the bands he loved than anything else. He was not trying to come off as British. The Stones used a southern accent and no one crawled up their ass for it.", an explanation Jourgensen himself had also given in a prior, 1983 interview with Richard Skinner.

Departed from Arista, Jourgensen returned with Ministry on Wax Trax! in mid-1984. While working as a cashier in the Wax Trax! store, he continued to record new material. In autumn 1984, Ministry embarked on a new tour with a renewed line-up, supported by Belgian industrial dance act Front 242. During this tour, Sire Records co-owner Seymour Stein attended several gigs, offering the band a new deal; Jourgensen, recalling his negative experience with Arista, repeatedly declined, but eventually agreed to sign on the condition that Sire would provide resources to support the Wax Trax! imprint; as Jourgensen put it, "it was kind of a personal sacrifice to keep that company rolling and allow them to keep signing bands." George left Ministry soon after this tour, disagreeing with Jourgensen over increased use of drum machines, and went on to form the short-lived band Colortone, and, much later, to pursue a record engineering career. Ministry released several singles throughout the summer of 1985—"All Day", "(Every Day Is) Halloween" and "The Nature of Love", as well as a reissue of "Cold Life"—which were cited as marking Jourgensen's first attempt at injecting industrial elements into Ministry's sound. Initially the B-side on "All Day" single, "... Halloween" became viewed as a goth anthem similar to Bauhaus' "Bela Lugosi's Dead"; "The Nature of Love", which came out in June 1985, became Ministry's final single on Wax Trax!; in July 1985, the band was shown as signed to Sire Records.

=== Twitch (1985–1987) ===
Ministry's first release with Sire/Warner Bros. was the single "Over the Shoulder" in 1985, preceding the release of the band's second studio album, Twitch, in March 1986. Twitch was recorded and mixed largely at Southern Studios in London and Hansa Tonstudio in West Berlin during 1985, with the On-U Sound Records owner Adrian Sherwood and Jourgensen sharing co-production duties. Despite the contribution of several others (namely Belgian singer Luc van Acker and Sherwood's Tackhead bandmate Keith LeBlanc), the album material was mainly performed by Jourgensen, listed as the band's sole member. Some material, recorded during the Twitch sessions, was later used for LeBlanc's and Sherwood's other projects, most prominently LeBlanc's solo album Major Malfunction.

On release, Twitch hit No. 194 in Billboard 200, and was supported by a US and Canadian tour. Jourgensen assembled a new touring line-up, featuring Roland Barker on keyboards, Paul Barker on bass and Bill Rieflin on drums. Twitch received mixed reviews, with a music critic Robert Christgau stating, "Chicago's Anglodisco clones meet Anglodisco renegade Adrian Sherwood and promptly improve themselves by trading in wimpy on arty"; nevertheless, the album came to be viewed as a pivotal point in the band's discography, as it signaled ongoing changes in Ministry's sound. In later publications, Jourgensen credited Sherwood with giving his music an aggressive edge and providing production advice, but considered the record "so Adrian Sherwood-influenced."

=== Breakthrough success (1988–1993) ===
After Twitch, Paul Barker became Jourgensen's primary collaborator in Ministry; until his departure, he was the only person credited as a member of the band other than Jourgensen. Jourgensen then made another significant change to Ministry's sound when he resumed playing electric guitar. With Rieflin on drums, Ministry recorded The Land of Rape and Honey (1988). The album continued their success in the underground music scene. The Land of Rape and Honey made use of synthesizers, keyboards, tape loops, jackhammering drum machines, dialogue excerpted from movies, unconventional electronic processing, and, in parts, heavy distorted electric guitar and bass. The album was supported by a tour in 1988 and the singles and music videos for "Stigmata" and "Flashback". "Stigmata" was also used in a key scene in Richard Stanley's 1990 film Hardware, although the band shown performing the song was Gwar.

The follow-up album, The Mind Is a Terrible Thing to Taste, was released in 1989. Due to the complex nature of the album's drumming, a second drummer, Martin Atkins (formerly of Public Image Ltd. and Killing Joke), was hired. In addition to Atkins, a ten-piece touring line-up was formed, consisting of Chris Connelly (keyboards and vocals), Skinny Puppy vocalist Nivek Ogre (vocals and keyboards), Joe Kelly (vocals and backing vocals) and guitarists Mike Scaccia, Terry Roberts, and William Tucker, with Jourgensen, Paul Barker and Rieflin serving as the group's core members. This tour was documented on In Case You Didn't Feel Like Showing Up. Two opening tracks, "Burning Inside" and "Thieves", were released as a commercial single; "Burning Inside" was accompanied by a music video.

After completing the Revolting Cocks tour in early 1991, Jourgensen and his bandmates began work on a follow-up to The Mind ... at Chicago Trax! studios, amidst problems brought on by growing substance abuse. During these initial sessions, Gibby Haynes of the Butthole Surfers recorded vocals for what became "Jesus Built My Hotrod", which hit No. 19 in the Modern Rock Tracks chart with approximately 128,000 copies as of mid-July 1992; considered Ministry's first and biggest commercial hit, it built significant anticipation for their upcoming album, then titled The Tapes of Wrath. In an attempt to distance themselves from drugs and find fresh perspective, the band relocated from Chicago to Lake Geneva, Wisconsin, to record at Royal Recorders studios for ten weeks. After considering the Wisconsin sessions a "washout", they returned to Chicago to complete the album – now entitled Psalm 69: The Way to Succeed and the Way to Suck Eggs, after a chapter from Aleister Crowley's The Book of Lies – by early May 1992, with only nine of about thirty songs written being chosen to feature. The album was influenced by speed and thrash metal, often being described as their fastest record by fans and critics. It was released on July 14, 1992, and peaked at No. 27 on the Billboard 200 chart. Soon after, Ministry was invited to headline the second Lollapalooza tour with Pearl Jam, Red Hot Chili Peppers and Soundgarden, among others, before commencing a tour of Europe and the US, with Helmet and Sepultura as supporting acts.

=== Middle years, turmoil and Jourgensen's drug addiction (1994–2001) ===
In October 1994, Ministry performed at the eighth Bridge School Benefit charity concert, with sets of cover songs (most prominently Bob Dylan's "Lay Lady Lay") and one original song, "Paisley", which was intended to be on their next album. After constructing a studio in Austin, Texas in 1993, the band proceeded to record a new album in July 1994. After refusing to perform drums on "Lay Lady Lay", Rieflin parted ways with Jourgensen midway through the recording process. Along with newly recruited Rey Washam (formerly of Scratch Acid, Didjits, and Rapeman) who performed the rest of the album's drum work, Ministry performed as one of the headliners for Australia and New Zealand's Big Day Out touring festival in January 1995. In spite of their growing success, Ministry was nearly derailed by drug problems and a series of arrests followed in August 1995. Completed at Chicago Trax Studios, Filth Pig was released in 1996. Musically, Filth Pig was more heavy metal than industrial, with synthesizers and samples mostly stripped from a mix that focused on conventional hard rock instrumentation.

The album's songs were played mostly at slower tempos than those on their previous three LPs, giving it an almost doom metal feel. Filth Pig was supported with the singles/videos "Reload", "The Fall", "Lay Lady Lay" and "Brick Windows" and with a tour in 1996 (the live performances were later anthologized on the Sphinctour album and DVD in 2002). Jourgensen has subsequently said that he was severely depressed during this period, that Filth Pig reflects this, and that he dislikes performing music from Filth Pig.

Ministry recorded their final studio album for Warner Bros. Records, Dark Side of the Spoon (1999), which they dedicated to William Tucker, who committed suicide earlier that year. For Dark Side of the Spoon, Ministry tried to diversify their sound by adding some melodic and synthetic touches to their usual electro-metal sound, along with some jazz influences, but the album was not well received, critically or commercially. However, the single "Bad Blood" appeared on the soundtrack album of The Matrix and was nominated for a 2000 Grammy award. During this period, Jourgensen had an infected toe amputated after accidentally stepping on a discarded hypodermic needle.

In the summer of 2000, Ministry was invited to that year's Ozzfest; amidst a management changeover, they were dropped from the bill and replaced by Soulfly.

After Ministry were dropped from Warner Bros. in 2000, the label issued the 2001 collection Greatest Fits, which featured a new song, "What About Us?". Ministry would later perform the song in a cameo appearance in the Steven Spielberg film AI: Artificial Intelligence. In 2000–2002, disputes with Warner Bros. Records resulted in the planned live albums Live Psalm 69, Sphinctour and ClittourUS on Ipecac Recordings being canceled. Sphinctour was released on Sanctuary Records.

=== Jourgensen's recovery from drug addiction and comeback (2001–2007) ===
Around 2001, Jourgensen almost lost his arm when he was bitten by a venomous spider. By his own admission, Jourgensen was suicidal during this period and decided to call an acquaintance he had met years earlier; the acquaintance, Angelina Lukacin, helped Jourgensen give up his massive substance habit, which included heroin and cocaine "speedballs", crack, LSD, various pharmaceuticals and as many as two full bottles of Bushmills whiskey per day (Lukacin and Jourgensen married soon after). Jourgensen and Barker, along with Max Brody who had joined as a saxophone player for the 1999 tour, focused on developing songs for a new record during 2001 and 2002, with the band issuing Animositisomina on Sanctuary Records in 2003. The sound was strongly heavy metal with voice effects, though it featured an almost-pop cover of Magazine's "The Light Pours Out Of Me". Animositisomina, compared to previous releases, sold poorly and singles for "Animosity" and "Piss" were canceled before they could be released.

Barker announced his departure from Ministry in January 2004. He stated that the trigger was his father dying while the band was wrapping up a summer tour in Europe, and also stated that his family life was his main focus at that particular time. Lukacin stated in 2013 that Jourgensen fell out with Barker over the band's finances. Jourgensen continued Ministry with Mike Scaccia and various other musicians.

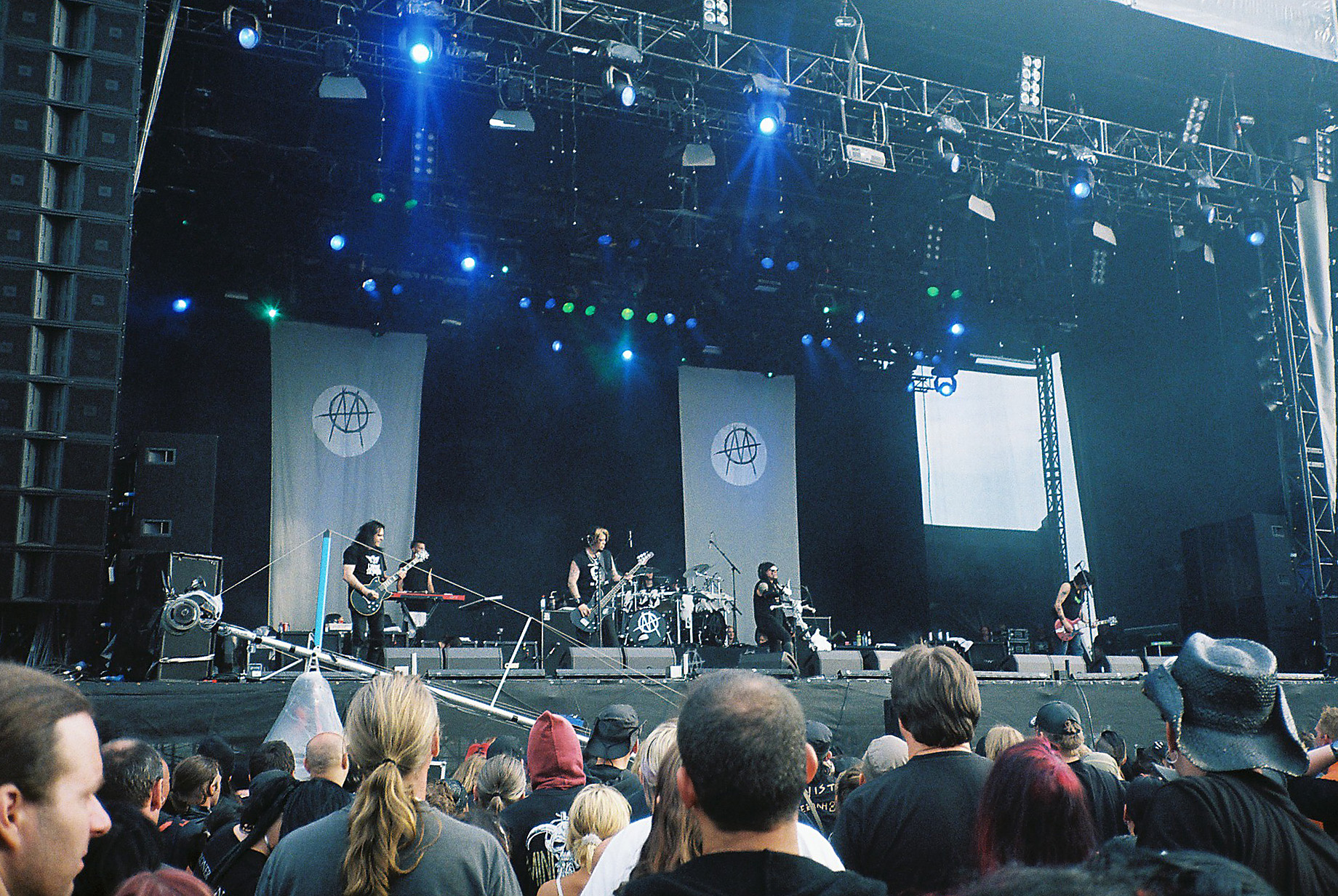
Ministry performing live at the 2006 M'era Luna Festival (Hildesheim, Germany)

For Ministry's next album, Jourgensen released the song "No W", a song critical of then-U.S. President George W. Bush; an alternate version of the track was placed on the multi-performer compilation Rock Against Bush, Vol. 1. The follow-up LP, Houses of the Molé (2004), contained the most explicitly political lyrics Jourgensen had yet written, with songs played more crudely than on previous recordings, giving the album the most metal-oriented sound of their career. In 2006, the band released Rio Grande Blood, an LP on Jourgensen's own 13th Planet Records. With Prong's Tommy Victor and Killing Joke's Paul Raven, the album featured an even heavier thrash metal sound drawing comparison to Slayer. The single "Lieslieslies" was nominated for the Grammy Award for Best Metal Performance at the 49th annual Grammy Awards. It, along with another song on the album, "The Great Satan", is also available as a downloadable content song for the 2008 video game Rock Band 2. In July 2007, the band released Rio Grande Dub, an album featuring remixes from the band's 2006 Rio Grande Blood album.

The Last Sucker, which Jourgensen expected to be Ministry's "final" album, was released on September 18, 2007.

Paul Raven died on October 20, 2007, a month and two-days after the release of The Last Sucker, suffering an apparent heart attack shortly after arriving in Europe to commence recording for the French industrial band Treponem Pal near the Swiss border.

=== Breakup and posthumous releases (2008–2011) ===
Jourgensen remixed and co-produced Spyder Baby's "Bitter", which was released by Blind Prophecy Records in early 2008.

A song titled "Keys to the City", which became the theme song for the Chicago Blackhawks, was released on March 5, 2008. In addition to this single, two albums of covers/remixes, Cover Up (April 1, 2008) and Undercover (December 6, 2010) were released. All of these releases are credited to Ministry and Co-Conspirators, since they feature collaborations between Jourgensen and other musicians.

Ministry's "farewell" tour, the "C-U-LaTour", started its North American leg on March 26, 2008, with Meshuggah performing as special guests and Hemlock as an opening act. They played their final North American shows in Chicago on May 10 and 12, 2008. The final date on the international leg of the tour was at the Tripod in Dublin, Ireland on July 18, 2008. During the performance, Jourgensen repeatedly reaffirmed it would indeed be the last Ministry show. Due to a large demand for tickets, an extra gig was added at the Tripod on July 19, 2008. The band again played to a full house. Ministry's final song at this show (and ostensibly their last live performance) was a rendition of their cover version of "What a Wonderful World".

Adios ... Puta Madres, a live album featuring material culled from the tour, was released in 2009 on CD and DVD.

A documentary film called Fix: The Ministry Movie was planned for release sometime in 2010. However, the release date was pushed back to early 2011. Eventually, it premiered at the Chicago International Movies & Music Festival. Jourgensen sued the filmmaker, Doug Freel, for failing to fulfill a portion of the contract giving Jourgensen approval over the final cut, along with "thousands of dollars". The lawsuit was dropped in July 2011. On July 21, the film was screened privately at the Music Box Theater in Los Angeles.

=== Reunion, Relapse, death of Mike Scaccia and From Beer to Eternity (2011–2015) ===
On August 7, 2011, Ministry announced they would reform and would play at Germany's Wacken Open Air festival, set to take place on August 2–4, 2012. The reunion lineup featured Al Jourgensen on vocals, Mike Scaccia and Tommy Victor on guitars, Aaron Rossi on drums, John Bechdel on keyboards, and Tony Campos on bass.

Jourgensen told Metal Hammer in August 2011 that Ministry was working on a new album called Relapse, which they hoped to release by Christmas. Regarding the sound of the new material, he explained, "We've only got five songs to go. I've been listening to it the last couple of weeks and I wasn't really in the mood, I was just taking it as a joke. Just to pass the time at first but [Mikey's] raving about it. It's like, dude c'mon, this is not about Bush, so ... that part's over. The ulcers are gone and Bush is gone so it's time for something new. I think this is actually gonna wind up being the fastest and heaviest record I've ever done. Just because we did it as anti-therapy therapy against the country music we would just take days off and thrash faster than I've done in a long time, faster than Mikey's done in a long time. He just did a Rigor Mortis tour and said it was easy compared to this Ministry stuff so it's gonna be brutal and it's gonna freak a lot of people out."

Ministry announced on their website that they entered the studio on September 1, 2011, with engineer Sammy D'Ambruoso to begin recording their new album. During the third webisode featuring behind-the-scenes footage from the making of Relapse, a release date of March 23, 2012, was announced.

On December 23, 2011, Ministry released "99 Percenters", the first single from Relapse, and began streaming it on their Facebook page two days later. On February 24, 2012, Ministry released a second single, "Double Tap", which was included in the April 2012 issue of the Metal Hammer magazine. On March 23, 2012, Relapse was released; it was supported with "Defibrillatour", a concert tour which lasted from that year's June to August.

On December 23, 2012, guitarist Mike Scaccia died following an on-stage heart attack, while playing with his other band, Rigor Mortis. In an interview with Noisey in March 2013, Jourgensen announced that Ministry would break up again, explaining that he did not want to carry on without Scaccia. He explained, "Mikey was my best friend in the world and there's no Ministry without him. But I know the music we recorded together during the last weeks of his life had to be released to honor him. So after his funeral, I locked myself in my studio and turned the songs we had recorded into the best and last Ministry record anyone will ever hear. I can't do it without Mikey and I don't want to. So yes, this will be Ministry's last album." The album, titled From Beer to Eternity, was released on September 6, 2013. Jourgensen stated that Ministry would tour in support of From Beer to Eternity, but would not record any more albums.

=== AmeriKKKant and Moral Hygiene (2016–2022) ===
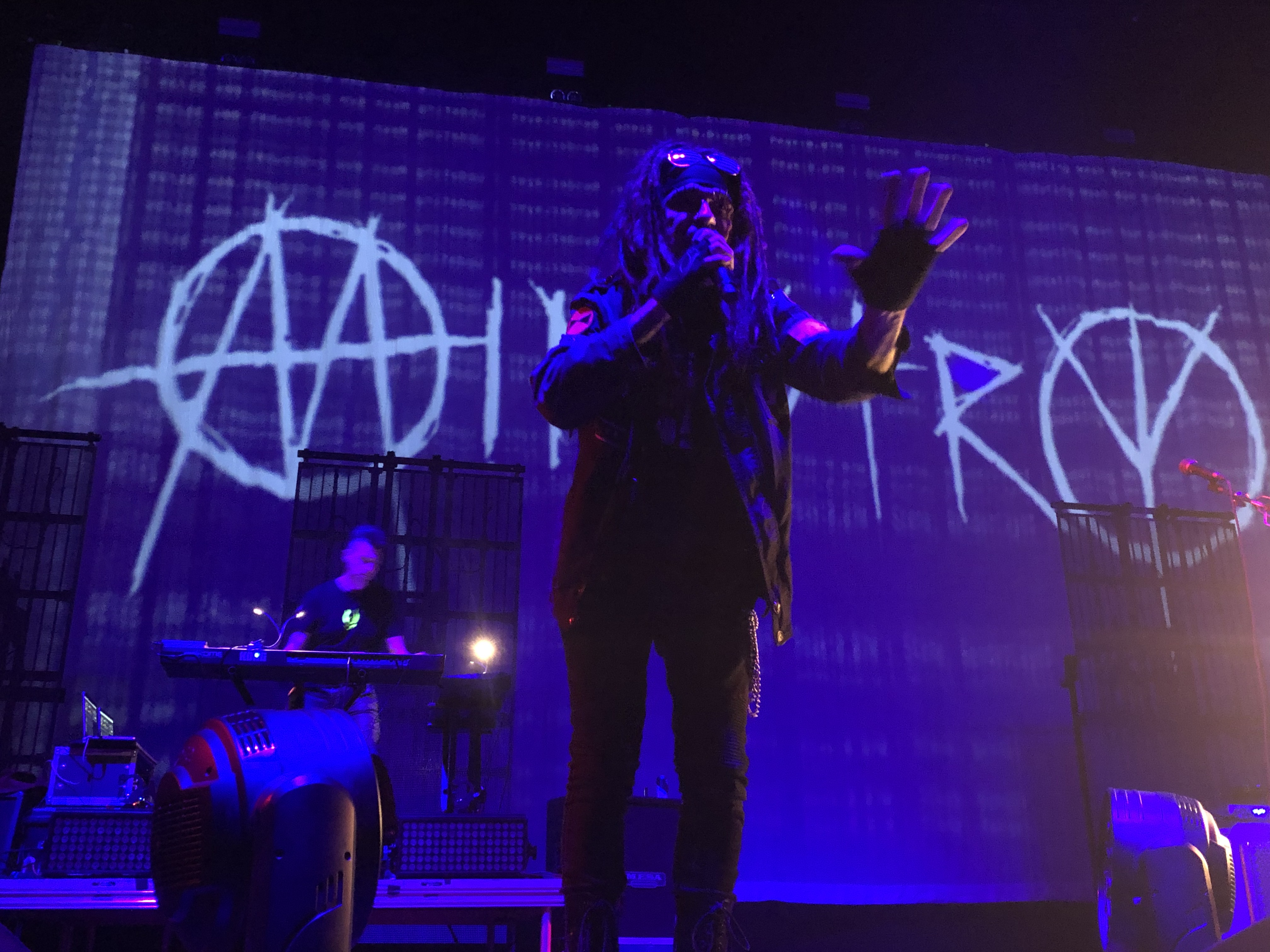
Jourgensen and Bechdel (in the background) performing with Ministry at The Forum in 2019

In an April 2016 interview with Loudwire, Jourgensen stated that Ministry would make a follow-up to From Beer to Eternity "if the circumstances are right." When asked in July about the possibility of a new album, Jourgensen stated, "When I was asked [before], it was after Mikey passed and the entire media immediately starts asking me what is going to happen to Ministry. He wasn't even buried yet. I thought, 'Fuck you.' I was really pissed and really angry. I said, 'Fuck Ministry and fuck you for asking.' They want to comment on Ministry when my best friend had died. It's been more than two years now, and I got more ideas and I have done albums with Mikey and have done them without him. It's time to get another record out. I have a bunch of songs written in my head. I wanted to have time to mourn before people start asking me about touring dates. It was sick. I was bombarded and email boxes were overloaded with 'what are you going to do now?' It was kind of creepy."

By February 2017, Ministry had begun working on their fourteenth studio album, titled AmeriKKKant. The album, released on March 9, 2018, includes guest appearances from Burton C. Bell of Fear Factory, former N.W.A member Arabian Prince, DJ Swamp and Lord of the Cello. During their performance at the Blackest of the Black Fest in Silverado, California in May 2017, Ministry debuted their first song in four years, "Antifa", which, at the time, was expected to appear on AmeriKKKant.

In an October 2018 interview with Billboard magazine, Jourgensen revealed that he had begun working on new material for Ministry's fifteenth studio album. He explained, "I have to get as many albums as I can done while Trump is still president, and then what am I going to do: write those crappy albums that I write while Democrats are president?" A month later, media reports noted that Jourgensen had reconnected with former member Paul Barker after 15 years, hinting that the two might collaborate once again on the upcoming Ministry album.

In a 2019 interview with Revolver magazine, Jourgensen reaffirmed that he had been working on new material since 2018, and revealed that he had hired Paul D'Amour (formerly of Tool) as the new bassist of Ministry. The band – alongside Primus and Philip H. Anselmo & The Illegals – opened for Slayer on the final North American leg of their farewell tour, which took place in November 2019.

In December 2019, the band released a visual history coffee table book, Ministry: Prescripture, with author Aaron Tanner.

In January 2020, Ministry announced the "Industrial Strength Tour" would start in 2020, with drummer London May of Samhain, which would feature both KMFDM and Front Line Assembly as guests. The tour was to begin on July 1 and extend until August. In May 2020, the band announced that they postponed all dates on the Industrial Strength Tour until 2021, due to the COVID-19 pandemic. The 25–date tour, with KMFDM and Front Line Assembly, was scheduled to take place in March and April 2021; the trek was once again postponed to the fall of 2021, this time with Helmet replacing KMFDM, who were unable to partake in the tour because of restrictions caused by the COVID in their native Germany. On September 24, 2021, Ministry announced that The Industrial Strength tour had been postponed once more because of the pandemic, with the tour now scheduled to take place in March and April 2022, and the Melvins and Corrosion of Conformity replacing Front Line Assembly and Helmet as special guests.

On January 17, 2020, Billboard released an exposé on guitar player Sin Quirin, detailing accounts of Quirin's alleged behavior including sexual relationships with underage females while touring in San Antonio, TX, Portland, OR, and Tacoma, WA, in the early 2000s. In May 2021, Quirin announced via Facebook that he was leaving Ministry.

On March 24, 2020, longtime drummer Bill Rieflin died of cancer, which had been kept private. Rieflin had joined King Crimson in 2013, and his death was announced March 25 by Robert Fripp via Facebook.

On April 24, 2020, one month after Rieflin's passing, Ministry released their first song in two-and-a-half years, "Alert Level", which was expected to appear on the band's then-upcoming fifteenth studio album.

In May 2021, the band announced that drummer Roy Mayorga had rejoined the band.

On July 8, 2021, Ministry released "Good Trouble" as the first single from their fifteenth studio album Moral Hygiene, which was released on October 1.

=== Hopiumforthemasses and Hate to Go – Take Out or Delivery (2022–present) ===
About two weeks after the release of Moral Hygiene, Jourgensen revealed that another Ministry album would "be out in 6-8 months." In a March 2022 interview with Metal Edge, Jourgensen said that the album would feature an arena rock-styled sound, and he also hinted at one final Ministry album. He reiterated his idea of disbanding Ministry in 2023, expecting the last Ministry material to be a re-recording of their first album With Sympathy.

In early 2023, Ministry announced a tour with Gary Numan and Front Line Assembly, which lasted from April 20 to May 13, 2023. The band performed a cover of Ricky's Hand by Fad Gadget with Numan, on two nights.

In April 2023, the band played a new song live titled "Goddamn White Trash" from their then-upcoming album Hopium for the Masses, which was planned to be released on August 4. However, it was announced that the album (with the new title Hopiumforthemasses) would be released on March 1, 2024.

In the fall of 2023, Ministry, along with Filter, opened the Freaks on Parade tour, headlined by Alice Cooper and Rob Zombie. The tour spanned one month, lasting from August 24, 2023, until September 24, 2023, visiting 19 venues across the United States and Canada. After the Freaks on Parade tour ended, Ministry announced that they would be touring with Gary Numan and Front Line Assembly again for the Hopiumforthemasses Tour, which began on February 27 and ended on April 5, 2024.

In February 2024, Jourgensen confirmed in an interview with Loudwire that Ministry intended to release one final album and then disband, declaring, "I think it's a good time to stop." The band entered the studio in June 2024 to begin work on their seventeenth studio album, and confirmed that same month they were reuniting with multi-instrumentalist Paul Barker 21 years after the latter's departure. In July 2024 Roy Mayorga took a hiatus from the band to join Jerry Cantrell on tour and was replaced by KYNG and Strife drummer Pepe Clarke who continues to play with the band. On October 7, 2024, Ministry announced that they were signed to Cleopatra Records for the release of their final studio album.

The band released a collection of re-recorded material from its early days (including re-recorded songs off their first two albums With Sympathy and Twitch), The Squirrely Years Revisited, and "comes ahead of the final new studio album from Ministry in 2026, a record that has Jourgensen teaming up with Paul Barker once again;" on March 28, 2025.

Ministry's seventeenth and final studio album, Hate to Go – Take Out or Delivery, was released on October 30, 2026. The band will tour in support of the album, including embarking on the Goodbye Europe tour in April and May 2027. According to Jourgensen, Ministry's final concert is set to take place at the Kia Forum on October 30, 2027, one year after the release of Hate to Go – Take Out or Delivery.

== Artistry ==
Ministry's experimentation, stylistic variation and changes during its career cross several genres of popular music. The band is most commonly categorized as industrial metal and industrial rock. Other genres include alternative metal, EBM, electro-industrial, thrash metal, groove metal, and progressive metal. Their early output has been variously described as new wave, synth-pop, dance-pop, and dark wave. In the April 1989 issue of Spin magazine, an author Michael Corcoran labelled the band as "industrial disco"; in 1994, writer Simon Glickman used this term as well. AllMusic's Steve Huey states that, previous to Nine Inch Nails' rise to mainstream popularity, "Ministry did more than any other band to popularize industrial dance music, injecting large doses of punky, over-the-top aggression and roaring heavy metal guitar riffs that helped their music find favor with metal and alternative audiences outside of industrial's cult fan base." Despite frequent descriptions of the band's music as industrial, Jourgensen disputed the use of this tag in several publications since the early 1990s, preferring instead to identify his style as "aggro", and, much later "industrious".

Despite Jourgensen's dislike of touring, Ministry is noted for their live performances, featuring extended versions of songs (as evidenced on In Case You Didn't Feel Like Showing Up) and disturbing visual imagery. MTV also recognized the band as an influential heavy metal act, highlighting the use of sampling during their heyday. Alternative Press included Ministry in their 1996 list of 100 underground inspirations of the past 20 years, stating that they merged "metal, samples, synths, and the 100-mph sound of urban paranoia, they pretty much created industrial music as we know it." Jourgensen revealed in 2008 that Ministry music is mostly on drop D and standard E tuning.

== Related projects ==
Jourgensen, with former and current bandmates, has been active in a number of musical projects besides Ministry. Foremost of these was the Revolting Cocks, founded by Jourgensen, Richard 23 and Luc van Acker during Ministry and Front 242's tour in 1984. Since its formation, the band has released a number of records, and has gone through several line-up changes. 1000 Homo DJs, a project purposed for outtakes from The Land of Rape and Honey and The Mind ... , has recorded a cover of Black Sabbath's "Supernaut", featuring Nine Inch Nails frontman and one-time Revolting Cocks touring member Trent Reznor. PTP, a project led by Jourgensen and Barker, included the assistance from Nivek Ogre on one occasion, and Connelly on another, and notably provided the song "Show Me Your Spine" featured in Paul Verhoeven's 1987 film RoboCop. Other notable projects include Pailhead with Ian MacKaye of Minor Threat and Fugazi, Lard with former Dead Kennedys lead singer Jello Biafra, and Acid Horse with Cabaret Voltaire members Richard H. Kirk and Stephen Mallinder. Buck Satan and the 666 Shooters, a country project led by Jourgensen, released the sole album, Bikers Welcome Ladies Drink Free, in 2012 through 13th Planet Records. Jourgensen also released a self-titled album under the name Surgical Meth Machine, a speed metal project originally tributed to guitarist Mike Scaccia, in 2016.

Barker has released several solo recordings under various monikers, including Age of Reason and Chicks & Speed: Futurism as Lead into Gold in 1990, The Perfect Pair as Flowering Blight in 2008, and Fix This!!!, an accompanying soundtrack of Fix: The Ministry Movie, under his own name in 2012. Through the 2000s, Barker formed Pink Anvil with Max Brody and U.S.S.A. with the Jesus Lizard guitarist Duane Denison. Brody and Scaccia have also released materials as Goobersmoochers via Brody's Bandcamp site.

== Members ==
=== Current members ===
Image	Name	Years active	Instruments	Release contributions
	Al Jourgensen	1981–2008; 2011–present	lead vocals; rhythm guitar; keyboards; programming; harmonica; bandolin	all releases
	John Bechdel	2006–2008; 2011–present	keyboards	Rio Grande Dub (2007); The Last Sucker (2007); Adios... Puta Madres (2009); The Last Dubber (2009); AmeriKKKant (2018); Moral Hygiene (2021); Hopiumforthemasses (2024); The Squirrely Years Revisited (2025); Hate to Go – Take Out or Delivery (2026)
	Cesar Soto	2015–present	lead guitar; backing vocals	AmeriKKKant (2018); Moral Hygiene (2021); Hopiumforthemasses (2024); The Squirrely Years Revisited (2025); Hate to Go – Take Out or Delivery (2026)
	Paul D'Amour	2019–present	bass	Moral Hygiene (2021); Hopiumforthemasses (2024); The Squirrely Years Revisited (2025); Hate to Go – Take Out or Delivery (2026)
	Pepe Clarke	2024–present	drums	Hate to Go – Take Out or Delivery (2026)
	Patrick Houston	2026–present	rhythm guitar, backing vocals	none

=== Former members ===
Image	Name	Years active	Instruments	Release contributions
	Stephen George	1981–1985	drums; percussion	With Sympathy (1983); Twitch (1986); Twelve Inch Singles (1981–1984) (1987); Early Trax (2004)
	Robert Roberts	1981–1983	keyboards; backing vocals	With Sympathy (1983); Twelve Inch Singles (1981–1984) (1987); Early Trax (2004)
	John Davis	1981–1982 (died 2009)	keyboards; backing vocals	With Sympathy (1983); Twelve Inch Singles (1981–1984) (1987); Early Trax (2004)
	Martin Sorenson	1981–1982	bass	With Sympathy (1983); Twelve Inch Singles (1981–1984) (1987); Early Trax (2004)
	Brad Hallen	1982–1984	bass	With Sympathy (1983); Twitch (1986); Twelve Inch Singles (1981–1984) (1987); Early Trax (2004)
	Mark Pothier	1982–1983	keyboards; backing vocals	With Sympathy (1983)
	Paul Barker	1986–2003	bass; keyboards; programming; production; vocals; guitar	The Land of Rape and Honey (1988); The Mind Is a Terrible Thing to Taste (1989); In Case You Didn't Feel Like Showing Up (1990); ΚΕΦΑΛΗΞΘ (1992); Filth Pig (1996); Dark Side of the Spoon (1999); Greatest Fits (2001); Sphinctour (2002); Animositisomina (2003); Rantology (2005); Toronto 1986 (2015); Hate to Go – Take Out or Delivery (2026)
	William "Bill" Rieflin	1986–1994 (died 2020)	drums; backing vocals; keyboards; guitar	The Land of Rape and Honey (1988); The Mind Is a Terrible Thing to Taste (1989); In Case You Didn't Feel Like Showing Up (1990); ΚΕΦΑΛΗΞΘ (1992); Filth Pig (1996); Greatest Fits (2001); Rantology (2005); Toronto 1986 (2015)
	Mike Scaccia	1989–1995; 2003–2006; 2011–2012 (died 2012)	lead guitar; backing vocals; bass	ΚΕΦΑΛΗΞΘ (1992); Filth Pig (1996); Greatest Fits (2001); Houses of the Molé (2004); Rantology (2005); Rio Grande Blood (2006); Relapse (2012); From Beer to Eternity (2013)
	Louis Svitek	1992–1999; 2003	rhythm guitar	ΚΕΦΑΛΗΞΘ (1992); Filth Pig (1996); Dark Side of the Spoon (1999); Animositisomina (2003); Rantology (2005)
	Duane Buford	1994–1999	keyboards; programming	Filth Pig (1996); Greatest Fits (2001); Sphinctour (2002); Rantology (2005)
	Rey Washam	1994–1999; 2003	drums	Filth Pig (1996); Dark Side of the Spoon (1999); Greatest Fits (2001); Sphinctour (2002); Animositisomina (2003); Houses of the Molé (2004); Rantology (2005)
	Zlatko Hukic	1996–1999	lead guitar	Filth Pig (1996); Dark Side of the Spoon (1999); Greatest Fits (2001); Sphinctour (2002); Rantology (2005)
	Max Brody	1999–2003; 2003–2004	saxophone; drums, percussion, programming (2000–2003, 2003–2004); backing vocals	Greatest Fits (2001); Animositisomina (2003); Houses of the Molé (2004); Rantology (2005)
	John Monte	2004	bass; backing vocals	Houses of the Molé (2004); Rantology (2005)
	Mark Baker	2004–2005	drums; percussion; backing vocals	Houses of the Molé (2004); Rantology (2005); Rio Grande Blood (2006)
	Tommy Victor	2005–2008; 2011–2012	rhythm guitar; lead guitar; backing vocals; bass	Rio Grande Blood (2006); The Last Sucker (2007); Adios... Puta Madres (2009); Relapse (2012)
	Paul Raven	2005–2007 (until his death)	bass; keyboards; backing vocals; guitar; programming; drums	Rio Grande Blood (2006); The Last Sucker (2007)
	Sin Quirin	2007–2008; 2012–2021	rhythm guitar; bass; keyboards	The Last Sucker (2007); Adios... Puta Madres (2009); Relapse (2012); From Beer to Eternity (2013); AmeriKKKant (2018)
	Tony Campos	2008; 2011–2015; 2017–2019	bass; backing vocals	Adios... Puta Madres (2009); Relapse (2012); From Beer to Eternity (2013); AmeriKKKant (2018)
	Aaron Rossi	2008; 2011–2016 (died 2025)	drums	Adios... Puta Madres (2009); From Beer to Eternity (2013)
	Jason Christopher	2016–2017	bass; backing vocals	AmeriKKKant (2018)
	Roy Mayorga	2016–2017; 2021–2024	drums	AmeriKKKant (2018); Moral Hygiene (2021); Hopiumforthemasses (2024); The Squirrely Years Revisited (2025)
	Derek Abrams	2017–2019	drums	none
	DJ Swamp	2017–2018	turntables	AmeriKKKant (2018)
	Monte Pittman	2021–2026 (Note: Pittman had been announced as Ministry's new guitarist in 2014 but did not appear with the band when they resumed touring in 2015.)	rhythm guitar; backing vocals	Hopiumforthemasses (2024); The Squirrely Years Revisited (2025); Hate to Go – Take Out or Delivery (2026)

=== Additional/touring musicians ===
Image	Name	Years active	Instruments	Release contributions
	Paul Taylor	1981	keyboards	Twelve Inch Singles (1981–1984) (1987)
	Audrey Stanzler	1981–1982	vocals	none
	Shay Jones	1982–1983	vocals	With Sympathy (1983)
	Yvonne Gage	1983–1984	vocals	Dark Side of the Spoon (1999)
	Doug Chamberlin	1984	keyboards; backing vocals	none
	Patty Jourgensen	1984	keyboards; backing vocals	Twelve Inch Singles (1981–1984) (1987); Early Trax (2004)
	John Soroka	1984	keyboards; backing vocals; percussion	none
	Sarolta DeFaltay	1986	keyboards	none
	Roland Barker	1986; 1992–1993	keyboards; saxophone (1986)	Toronto 1986 (2015)
	Marston Daley	1987	keyboards	none
	Luc Van Acker	1987	vocals	Twitch (1986)
	Jeff Ward	1988 (died 1993)	drums; backing vocals	The Mind Is a Terrible Thing to Taste (1989); Greatest Fits (2001)
	Nivek Ogre	1988–1990	vocals; guitar; keyboards	In Case You Didn't Feel Like Showing Up (1990)
	William Tucker	1989–1990 (died 1999)	guitar	In Case You Didn't Feel Like Showing Up (1990)
	Terry Roberts	1989–1990	guitar; backing vocals	In Case You Didn't Feel Like Showing Up (1990)
	Martin Atkins	1989–1990	drums	In Case You Didn't Feel Like Showing Up (1990)
	Joe Kelly	1989–1990	vocals	In Case You Didn't Feel Like Showing Up (1990)
	Chris Connelly	1989–1990; 1992–1993	vocals; keyboards (1989–1990)	The Land of Rape and Honey (1988); The Mind Is a Terrible Thing to Taste (1989); In Case You Didn't Feel Like Showing Up (1990)
	Michael Balch	1989–1992	keyboards; programming	In Case You Didn't Feel Like Showing Up (1990); ΚΕΦΑΛΗΞΘ (1992); Filth Pig (1996); Greatest Fits (2001); Rantology (2005)
	Marco Neves	1992	vocals	none
	Michel Bassin	1992	guitar	none
	Sam Ladwig	1992	guitar	none
	Casey Orr	1992; 2012	bass; keyboards	Relapse (2012)
	Barry Kooda	1994 (Bridge School Benefit)	guitar	none
	Richie Vasquez	1994 (Bridge School Benefit)	drums	none
	Adam Grossman	2003	guitar	Animositisomina (2003); Rantology (2005)
	Darrell James	2003–2004	keyboards	none
	Tia Sprocket	2003 (died 2017)	drums	none
	Eddy Garcia	2004	bass	none
	Rick Valles	2004	guitar	none
	Joey Jordison	2006 (died 2021)	drums	none
	Burton C. Bell	2008; 2018	vocals	The Last Sucker (2007); AmeriKKKant (2018)
	Thomas Holtgreve	2017	drums	none
	London May	2020–2021 (Note: May was announced as Ministry's new drummer for the Industrial Strength Tour in 2020, but the tour was delayed until 2022 due to COVID, by which time Roy Mayorga had returned. May never performed live with the band.)	drums	none
	Tina Guo	2024 (Cruel World Festival)	electric cello	none
	Mia Asano	2024 (Cruel World Festival)	electric violin	none
	Charlie Clouser	2024 (Cruel World Festival)	keyboards	Hopiumforthemasses (2024); The Squirrely Years Revisited (2025)
	Dez Cuchiara	2025	backing vocals	Hopiumforthemasses (2024); The Squirrely Years Revisited (2025)
	Leni Von Eckardt	2025	backing vocals	The Squirrely Years Revisited (2025)
	Gilden Tunador	2025	backing vocals	The Squirrely Years Revisited (2025)

== Discography ==
=== Studio albums ===
- With Sympathy (1983)
- Twitch (1986)
- The Land of Rape and Honey (1988)
- The Mind Is a Terrible Thing to Taste (1989)
- ΚΕΦΑΛΗΞΘ (1992)
- Filth Pig (1996)
- Dark Side of the Spoon (1999)
- Animositisomina (2003)
- Houses of the Molé (2004)
- Rio Grande Blood (2006)
- The Last Sucker (2007)
- Relapse (2012)
- From Beer to Eternity (2013)
- AmeriKKKant (2018)
- Moral Hygiene (2021)
- Hopiumforthemasses (2024)
- Hate to Go – Take Out or Delivery (2026)

== Tours ==
- With Sympathy Tour, 1983
- Wax Trax! Singles Tour, 1984
- Twitch Tour, 1986–1987
- The Land of Rape and Honey Tour, 1988
- The Mind Tour, 1989–1990
- Lollapalooza 1992
- Psalm 69 Tour, 1992–1994
- Big Day Out, 1995
- Sphinctour, 1996
- ClitourUS, 1999
- Fornicatour, 2003
- Evil Doer Tour, 2004–2005
- MasterBaTour, 2006
- C-U-LaTour, 2008
- DeFiBriLaTouR / Relapse Tour, 2012
- From Beer to EternaTour, 2015
- Death Grips and Ministry US Tour 2017
- The AmeriKKKant Tour, 2018
- EU/UK Summer Tour, 2019
- Slayer's Final Campaign Tour with Primus and Phillip H. Anselmo & The Illegals, 2019
- Industrial Strength Tour, 2022 (initially scheduled to take place in summer 2020, later rescheduled to fall 2021 and then spring 2022 due to COVID-19)
- Moral Hygiene Tour, 2022
- Ministry, Gary Numan and Front Line Assembly Tour 2023
- Freaks on Parade Tour 2024 with Rob Zombie, Alice Cooper and Filter
- The Squirrely Years Tour, 2025
- Europe Tour, 2025
- Goodbye Europe, 2027

== Bibliography ==
- Barker, Paul (Spring 1996). "Ministry". IndustrialnatioN. No. 12. Interviewed by Sharon Maher. pp. 24–27. ISSN 1062-449X – via the Internet Archive.
- Berelian, Essi (2005). The Rough Guide to Heavy Metal. London: Rough Guides. pp. 161, 198, 225–227. ISBN 1-84353-415-0. LCCN 2005283222. OCLC 1256510439 – via the Internet Archive.
- Brooks, Jeffrey S. (2017). "Chapter 5: The Evolution of a Revolution". In Terri N. Watson; Jeffrey S. Brooks; Floyd D. Beachum (eds.). Educational Leadership and Music: Lessons for Tomorrow's School Leaders. Charlotte, NC: Information Age Publishing. pp. 47–54. ISBN 9781681238579. Archived from the original on May 27, 2024 – via Google Books.
- Brown, Jake (2012). "Chapter 18: Al Jourgensen—The Ministry of Industrial Rock". Behind the Boards: The Making of Rock 'n' Roll's Greatest Records Revealed. Hal Leonard Books. pp. 195–202. ISBN 978-1-4584-1972-9.
- Fontenoy, Richard (2003). "Ministry". In Buckley, Piter (ed.). The Rough Guide to Rock. London, New York: Rough Guides. pp. 675–676. ISBN 1-84353-105-4. OCLC 1151158224 – via the Internet Archive.
- Glickman, Simon (1994). "Ministry". In Rubiner, Julia M. (ed.). Contemporary Musicians: Profiles of The People in Music. Vol. 10. Detroit / Washington, D.C. / London: Gale Research. pp. 164–166. ISBN 0-8103-2218-8. ISSN 1044-2197 – via the Internet Archive.
- Greene, Jo-Ann (April 2, 1993). "Ministry" (scans). Goldmine. Vol. 19, no. 7 (331). pp. 26, 28, 32, 38, 40. ISSN 1055-2685. Archived from the original on March 7, 2021 – via the Prongs.org archive.
- Jourgensen, Al & Wiederhorn, Jon (July 9, 2013). Ministry: The Lost Gospels According To Al Jourgensen. Boston, MA: Da Capo Press. ISBN 9780306822186. OCLC 811206550 – via the Internet Archive.
- Jourgensen, Al (July–December 2003). "Al Jourgensen Talks Politics with IN". IndustrialnatioN. No. 18. Interviewed by Sharon Maher. ISSN 1062-449X. Archived from the original on August 19, 2004.
- Knowles, Christopher (2010). The Secret History of Rock 'n' Roll. Berkeley, California: Viva Editions (Simon and Schuster). ISBN 978-1-57344-405-7. OCLC 748093098 – via the Internet Archive.
- Larkin, Colin, ed. (1998). "Ministry". Encyclopedia of Popular Music. Vol. 5 (3rd ed.). Muse UK Ltd. pp. 3692–3693. ISBN 1561592374. OCLC 1033560739 – via the Internet Archive.
- Locher, David A. (1998). "The Industrial Identity Crisis: The Failure of a Newly Forming Subculture to Identify Itself". In Jonathan S. Epstein (ed.). Youth Culture: Identity in a Postmodern World. Wiley-Blackwell Publishers. pp. 100–117. ISBN 1-55786-851-4. OCLC 1036979534 – via the Internet Archive.
- Masuo, Sandy (January–February 1996). "Ministry: It's Not Easy Being Mean". Option: Music Culture. No. 66. pp. 66–73. ISSN 0882-178X.
- McLeod, Kembrew (November 2004). "Ministry". In Brackett, Nathan (ed.). The New Rolling Stone Album Guide. New York: Simon & Schuster. p. 544. ISBN 0-7432-0169-8. OCLC 1036744932 – via the Internet Archive.
- Miller, Monica (August 2014). "'No man with a good car needs to be justified': Preaching Roack and Roll Salvation from O'Connor's Wise Blood to Ministry's 'Jesus Built My Hotrod.'". Flannery O'Connor Review. 12. Georgia College: 82–98. ISSN 0091-4924.
- Moon, Tom (2008). 1,000 Recordings to Hear Before You Die. New York: Workman Publishing Company. ISBN 978-0-7611-3963-8.
- Prown, Pete; Newquist, HP (1997). "Ministry / Chapter 33: Industrial and Grindcore". Legends of Rock Guitar: The Essential Reference of Rock's Greatest Guitarists. Foreword by Joe Satriani; edited by Jon Eiche. Milwaukee, WI: Hal Leonard Corporation. pp. 250–251. ISBN 0-7935-4042-9.
- Reed, S. Alexander (2013). Assimilate: A Critical History of Industrial Music. Oxford University Press. ISBN 978-0-19-983260-6. LCCN 2012-42281. OCLC 1147729910 – via the Internet Archive.
- Thompson, Dave (2000). Alternative Rock. Milwaukee, WI: Hal Leonard Corporation. ISBN 9780879306076. OCLC 1193377576 – via the Internet Archive.
- Wiederhorn, Jon & Turman, Katherine (2013). Louder Than Hell: The Definitive Oral History of Metal. New York: itbooks. ISBN 978-0-06-195828-1. OCLC 843469256 – via the Internet Archive.
