= Chris Summers (drummer) =

Norwegian musician (born 1974)

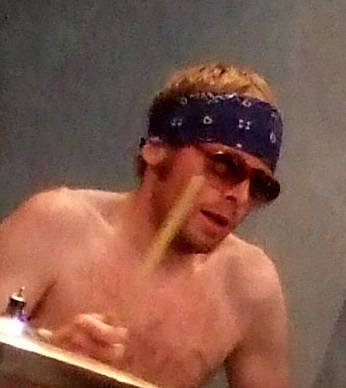
- Summers with Turbonegro in 2007

Background information
- Also known as: The Prince of Drummers; The Rolex of Drummers
- Born: Christer Engen; 7 November 1974 (age 51); Oslo
- Genres: Rock; Hard rock; Glam punk; Punk rock
- Occupations: Musician; teacher
- Instruments: Drums; percussion; vocals
- Years active: 1992–present
- Member of: Lady Friend
- Formerly of: Turbonegro; Bigbang; Euroboys

Christer Engen (born 7 November 1974), also known by his stage name Chris Summers, is a Norwegian musician best known as the drummer for rock bands Turbonegro, Bigbang and Euroboys. Engen was a founding member of Bigbang and played with the band from 1992 to 1997. He left Bigbang to join Turbonegro in 1997 and released four studio albums with the band until his departure in 2008. He is currently a member of the soft rock band Lady Friend.

== Career ==
Engen started his musical career when he founded Bigbang together with Øystein Greni while they were in high school. The two shared a common interest in American punk and hardcore bands, as well as classic rock from the 1960s, 70s and 80s. Engen released one album with Bigbang, Waxed, before being asked to join Turbonegro by guitarist Rune Rebellion in 1997. He toured with Turbonegro in support of Ass Cobra and later recorded the album Apocalypse Dudes with the band. In 1998, Turbonegro disbanded while on tour due to singer Hank von Hell's drug addiction and mental illness. The following year, Engen played drums on Bigbang's song "Wild Bird" off their Electric Psalmbook album. He again contributed drums to Bigbang on their 2000 studio album, Clouds Rolling By, including the hit song "Girl In Oslo".

Unbeknownst to Turbonegro, in the years that followed their break-up, the band would become a cult phenomenon with fan clubs called Turbojugend being established all over the world. Turbonegro reunited in 2002 and released their comeback album, Scandinavian Leather, in 2003. The band toured extensively in support of the album, including a tour of the United States with Queens of the Stone Age. Turbonegro released their next album, Party Animals, in 2005, and toured Europe and the United States throughout the year and the following year. The band released the album Retox in 2007. Later that year, Engen suffered a foot injury and played several festival shows with a broken foot before getting a stand-in. Engen left Turbonegro in 2008 due to his injury and touring fatigue. He would later reveal in a 2021 interview that it took four years for his foot to fully heal. After leaving Turbonegro, Engen has occasionally featured as a session musician and works as a junior high school teacher. In 2022, he released his first album with Lady Friend, Songs From The Guesthouse. Engen appeared with Bigbang at their 30th anniversary shows in August 2024, performing the Waxed album in its entirety and select songs from Electric Psalmbook and Clouds Rolling By.

== Personal life ==
Engen was engaged to singer Elvira Nikolaisen from 2007 to 2011. He married singer, musician and Lady Friend bandmate Anne Mette Hårdnes in 2023.

== Discography ==
=== With Turbonegro ===
==== Studio albums ====
- Apocalypse Dudes (1998)
- Scandinavian Leather (2003)
- Party Animals (2005)
- Retox (2007)

==== Live albums ====
- Darkness Forever! (1999)

==== Compilation albums ====
- Small Feces (2005)

=== With Bigbang ===
- Waxed (1995)

=== With Oslo Motherfuckers ===
- Greetings From The Big O (2002)

=== With Lady Friend ===
- Songs From The Guesthouse (2022)
- 5 O'Clock Man (2024)

=== Production, instrumental and vocal credits ===
Year	Artist	Title	Song(s)	Notes
1999	Bigbang	Electric Psalmbook	"Wild Bird"	Drums, percussion
1999	Bigbang	Electric Psalmbook	"So In Love", "How Do You Do"	Backing vocals
2000	Bigbang	Clouds Rolling By	"To The Mountains", "Girl In Oslo", "Sing And Dance"	Drums, percussion
2000	Euroboys	Getting Out Of Nowhere	"Scarborough Fair"	Vocals
2000	Tom Lund Band	–	"Europas Juvel"	Drums
2001	Amulet	Freedom Fighters		Percussion
2002	Kåre João	Sideman		Performer
2003	Backyard Babies	Stockholm Syndrome	"Friends"	Guest
2004	Turbonegro	No Music Requests	"Bloodstains" (Agent Orange cover)	Performer
2004	Euroboys	Soft Focus	"Fears Be Gone", "Topanga"	Drums, percussion
2004	Euroboys	Soft Focus	"Good Enough For Now"	Vocals, percussion
2005	Bigbang	Poetic Terrorism	"On Your Mind"	Drums
2005	Turbonegro	Det Beste Til Meg Og Mine Venner (En Hyllest Til Joachim Nielsen)	"Her Kommer Vinteren" (Jokke & Valentinerne cover)	Drums, backing vocals
2007	Bigbang	Something Special: The Best Of Bigbang	"Wild Bird", "Girl In Oslo"	Drums
2014	White Sands	–	"The Wait"	Drums
2018	Michael Krohn	Søvnløse Netter		Percussion
2020	Sweetheart	Sweetheart	"I Will Always Be Right Here"	Percussion
