= Sexual Harassment (album) =

Studio album by Turbonegro
- Released: 13 June 2012
- Recorded: January 2012
- Studio: Electric Lady Studios, New York City
- Genre: Glam punk; hard rock
- Length: 33:52
- Label: Scandinavian Leather Recordings; Universal Music; Volcom Entertainment
- Producer: Matt Sweeney

Turbonegro chronology
| Retox (2007) | Sexual Harassment (2012) | RockNRoll Machine (2018) |

Singles from Sexual Harassment
- 1. "You Give Me Worms" Released: May 2012; 2. "I Got a Knife" Released: November 2012

Sexual Harassment is the eight studio album by Norwegian rock band Turbonegro. It was released on 13 June 2012 through the band's label Scandinavian Leather Recordings, Universal Music and Volcom Entertainment. The album was produced by Matt Sweeney and is their first release to not feature founding member, guitarist and keyboardist Pål Pot Pamparius, the first since their debut album to not include singer Hank von Helvete, and the first since Ass Cobra to not feature drummer Chris Summers. It is also their first album with singer Tony "The Duke of Nothing" Sylvester and drummer Tommy Manboy, who both joined the band in 2011.

The album features instrumental and vocal contributions from Sweeney, Andrew W.K., Nate Newton and Benmont Tench, in addition to a songwriting contribution from Nick Oliveri. It is dedicated to Ryan Dunn of Jackass and Eivind Hovden, a Turbojugend member that was killed on Utøya during the 22 July attacks.

== Recording and release ==
Following singer Hank von Helvete's departure from Turbonegro in 2010, the band went on a hiatus until Tony Sylvester, president of the London charter of Turbojugend, and Tommy Akerholdt were hired as their new vocalist and drummer respectively in 2011. In December 2011, the band announced that Matt Sweeney would produce their next album and that recording sessions had been scheduled for January 2012, with Thomas Seltzer noting that the demos sounded like "a Roman war dog in heat". The album was recorded at Electric Lady Studios in New York City, with mixing and mastering handled at Malabar Studios and Sterling Sound respectively.

Sexual Harassment was released on 13 June 2012, five years after Turbonegro's last album. It is dedicated to the memory of Ryan Dunn of Jackass and Viva La Bam fame, who died in a car accident on 20 June 2011, and Turbojugend member Eivind Hovden, one of the victims at Utøya on 22 July 2011. In an interview with Dagsavisen in Norway, Seltzer noted of Hovden and the other victims, "He was one of the youngest that was killed on Utøya. He was a Turbo-child. So this is a gesture to one of ours that was taken. Everyone on Utøya was ours, mine and yours."

== Critical reception ==
The Guardian's Dom Lawson gave the album 4 out of 5 stars, writing that it "gleefully maintains [Turbonegro's] tradition of balls-out punk rock with a laudable undercurrent of sexual deviance". The Observer's Kitty Empire gave the album 2 out of 5 stars, noting that "a plod seems to have crept into [the band's] songs". Outburn's George Pacheco noted that new frontman Tony Sylvester was still finding his footing, resulting in an album that sounds like it was made by a good cover band. Now's Joanne Huffa thought the album had a "déjà vu quality", and was ultimately decent but not great.

== Track listing ==
All tracks are written by Thomas Seltzer and Knut Schreiner, except where noted.

| No. | Title | Writer(s) | Length |
|---|---|---|---|
| 1. | "I Got a Knife" | Tony Sylvester; Schreiner; Seltzer; Tommy Akerholdt | 2:29 |
| 2. | "Hello Darkness" | Sylvester; Schreiner; Seltzer | 2:55 |
| 3. | "Shake Your Shit Machine" | | 3:07 |
| 4. | "TNA (The Nihilistic Army)" | Sylvester; Schreiner; Nick Oliveri; Seltzer | 3:31 |
| 5. | "Mister Sister" | | 3:49 |
| 6. | "Dude Without a Face" | | 3:26 |
| 7. | "Buried Alive" | Sylvester; Schreiner; Seltzer | 2:17 |
| 8. | "Tight Jeans, Loose Leash" | | 3:51 |
| 9. | "Rise Below" | Sylvester; Schreiner; Seltzer | 4:04 |
| 10. | "You Give Me Worms" | | 3:23 |
| Total length: | | | 33:52 |

== Personnel ==
Turbonegro

- Tony "The Duke of Nothing" Sylvester – vocals
- Euroboy – lead guitar
- Rune Rebellion – rhythm guitar
- Happy-Tom – bass
- Tommy Manboy – drums

Additional personnel

- Matt Sweeney – producer, guitar (track 8), backing vocals
- Gus Oberg – recording engineer
- Peter Bischoff – engineer (assistant)
- Nick Terry – mixer
- Ted Jensen – mastering
- Andrew W.K. – piano (track 3), backing vocals
- Nate Newton – backing vocals (track 4, 6)
- Benmont Tench – piano (track 5)
- Martin Kvamme – art direction
- Gardar Eide Einarsson – artwork
- Matias Faldbakken – artwork
- Akimoto Fakuda – photography
- Raymond Mosken – photography (band)
