= Turbonegro =

Norwegian rock band

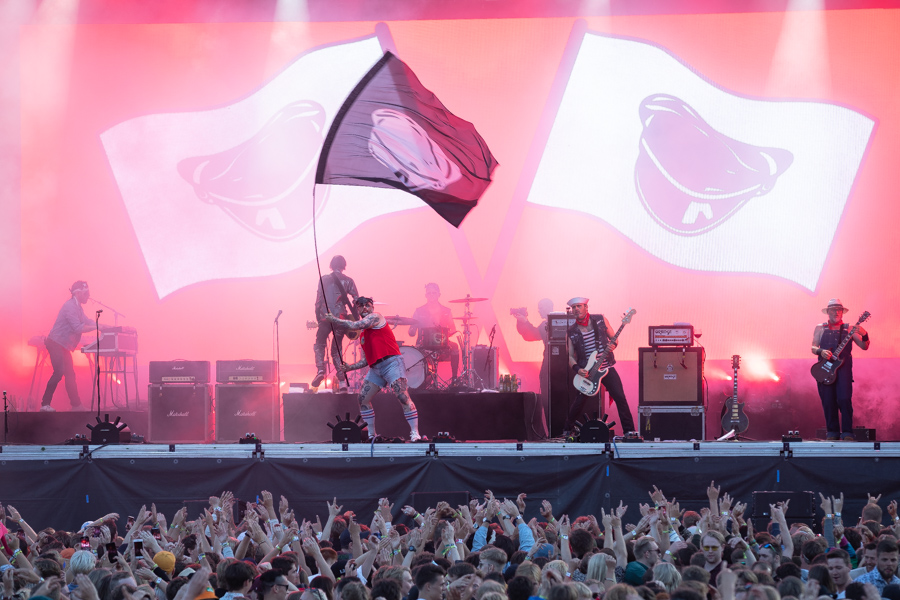
- Turbonegro in 2019

Background information
- Origin: Nesodden, Norway
- Genres: Glam punk, hard rock, punk rock
- Years active: 1989–1998, 2002–2010, 2011–present
- Labels: Big Ball, DogJob, Get Hip, Repulsion, Amphetamine Reptile, Boomba, Epitaph, Bitzcore, Sympathy, Burning Heart, Virgin, Man's Ruin, Scandinavian Leather, Burger
- Members: Duke of Nothing; Happy-Tom; Knut "Euroboy" Schreiner; Rune "Rune Rebellion" Grønn; Tommy Manboy; Crown Prince Haakon Marius
- Past members: Hank von Helvete; Harald "Harry" Fossberg; Pål Erik Carlin; Vegard Heskestad; Bengt "Bingo" Calmeyer; Ole Martinsen; Anders Gerner; Carlos Carrasco; Tor Kristian Jenssen; Chris Summers; Tomas "Caddy" Dahl; Pål Pot Pamparius
- Website: turbonegro.com

Turbonegro (Turboneger in Norway) is a Norwegian rock band, active from 1989 to 1998 and from 2002 to the present. The band combines glam rock, punk rock, and hard rock into a self-described "deathpunk" musical style.

== History ==
=== Early years (1989–1994) ===
Turbonegro formed in Oslo during the winter of 1988–1989. The initial lineup consisted of Thomas Seltzer (a.k.a. Happy-Tom), Vegard Heskestad, Pål Bøttger Kjærnes, Rune Grønn, Pål Erik Carlin and Tor-Kristian "TK" Jenssen. Seltzer and Heskestad had formerly performed in a band called "De Dype" – a noisy and subversive ensemble inspired by American rock band Butthole Surfers. Early Turbonegro continued that conceptional style.

Turbonegro played their first show in March 1989 at Ungdomshuset in Copenhagen, Denmark. In April, they played their home town of Oslo for the first time. In the following weeks, they recorded their debut single Route Zero and additional songs for their Turboloid 12" EP. Both records were released by Thomas Seltzer's label, Straitjacket Records, which he started in 1983 to release the EP of his first band Akutt Innleggelse. The first session was recorded at Nesodden Musikkverksted by Christian Calmeyer. Seltzer played bass and drums on Route Zero. An initial pressing of 50 copies came with an exclusive demo tape called Computech, featuring a cover of The Stooges' song 1970.

The early pre-deathpunk Turbonegro sound featured fairly tormented and distorted noise rock (contemporary reviews compared the band's sound to Halo of Flies or early Mudhoney). Turboloid was the second and last release by the original lineup. Drummer Carlos Carrasco left to play guitar for Anal Babes.

In 1990, Route Zero was reissued by Sympathy for the Record Industry with two additional songs from the Turboloid EP. In September of that year, Turbonegro left for a three-week tour of the United States. Hours after their arrival in Minneapolis, Grønn was beaten by local denizens and, as a result, hospitalized. The band continued touring without him, but the tour was unsuccessful. Three weeks after the tour began, the band returned to Oslo.

In the winter of 1990, Seltzer reformed Turbonegro with Kjærnes and Grønn. Norwegian punk veteran Harald Fossberg, who had gained fame in the late 1970s with Norwegian punk pioneers Hærverk, was recruited as the new singer. Bengt "Bingo" Calmeyer soon joined the band on bass guitar. In the summer of 1991, the new lineup released the Vaya Con Satan 7" in the U.S., followed by their 1992 debut album of Hot Cars and Spent Contraceptives on Big Ball Records. Both the single and the CD introduced the world to deathpunk, Turbonegro's self-acclaimed genre.

The musical pre-settings were anticipating later Ass Cobra era – dark death-driven punk rock with occasional excursions into hardcore and metal, as well as a tendency to disruptive and sarcastic lyrics. Swedish broadcasting DJ Lars Aldman once described their sound as, "Radio Birdman meets Venom in an institution for sexually abused retards," and Danish Moshable magazine wrote, "One great big hunk of an album that simply barfs up the best in Scandinavian punk rock - and then slam it into overdrive. So fucking punk that it will tear you a new asshole - and then some!"

In December 1992, Turbonegro began a ruinous tour outside Norway. With money left from a grant, they went for one gig confirmed in Ålborg, Denmark, then headed south to Hamburg, Germany, where they became stranded in an unsuccessful search for an opportunity to play. After five days, the band ran out of money, but then they were able to make contacts with Gravy Train Agency, who organized several tours for Turbonegro outside Scandinavia in later years, as well as people from Crypt Records.

In late March 1993, Fossberg played his last show with Turbonegro at Sentrum Scene in Oslo. He quit for health reasons and was replaced by Hans Erik Husby (a.k.a. Hank von Helvete), who would become their best known vocalist. With the new singer, the band was renamed Stierkampf (German for "bullfight"). They opened up for Poison Idea in Oslo and Denmark, as well as the Ramones in August 1993 at the Oslo Rock Festival.

The band's only professional release as Stierkampf was the Grunge Whore EP on Sympathy for the Record Industry. All songs on this release would resurface on their next album, with the exception of "Six Pack". Their second album Never Is Forever (1994) was recorded by Christian Calmeyer at Nesodden Musikkverksted, and was self-released (limited to 1,200 copies) with a friend at Oslo Musikk Distribusjon. In their own words, this second album was "a tribute to Blue Öyster Cult", an attempt to dissociate from the lo-fi aesthetics of the garage. "When the rest of the punk oriented world tried hard to be lo-fi and 'real', Turbonegro as usual went the opposite way, creating a miniature suburban deathpunk opera. Seldom have pop culture, darkness and desperation blended so well." The release of this album followed their first full European Tour, which was nicknamed "Nihil Jung" and had 17 shows in Denmark, Germany, Switzerland, Belgium and the Netherlands.

By the winter of 1994–1995, the band had reclaimed the name Turbonegro, but had a new look referred to as the "Al Jolson schtick", though it did not last long. Happy-Tom summed it up with an anecdote, "So there we were backstage with our black faces and wigs and little hats, smoking pot with our all-time heroes the Bad Brains, and the absurdity just didn't cross our minds. I mean, those guys didn't mention it, they were probably just embarrassed on our behalf."

=== New look and new sound, rise to success (1995–1997) ===
The gag was long gone by May 1995 when they debuted the denim and moustache look. Happy-Tom said, "We feel that denim out-rocks leather at all levels. Leather is for empty, little people. Denim is for us big guys! And the kids love it!" With a new look came a new sound. Calmeyer, their engineer at the time, said, "We decided to make things more raw, trying to convey the power of the live performance, if not the sound."

The first recordings of the new and improved Turbonegro were the "Denim Demon" and "Bad Mongo" singles in the spring of 1995. That summer, Turbonegro left for their second attempt at a U.S. tour, "Namblin in the 90's". They played only 11 shows. In the words of Happy-Tom, "at least we didn't get the shit kicked out of us like we did the last time we were in the USA". In the fall of 1995, Bingo and Pål left the band, putting Turbonegro on hold. Pål wanted to travel, while Bingo didn't like the new musical direction ("less Slayer, more rock'n'roll.") Happy-Tom, at the same time, was suffering from stress injuries to his arms after the U.S. tour. Therefore, agreements were made to put the band on hold for a while.

In that same year, Anthony Martin started his new label, Boomba Records, in order to release Turbonegro's third album Ass Cobra. It did not come out until the spring of 1996 and, by September, they were touring Europe again with a new lineup. Anders Gerner from Angst was added as the new drummer, so Happy-Tom returned to playing bass. Pål was replaced by Knut Schreiner, with whom Happy-Tom had played in The Vikings. Knut (a.k.a. Euroboy) was added to the band to help reshape their sound. The "Prince of the Rodeo" 7" was Euroboy's recording debut with Turbonegro.

Also at this time, Pamparius returned from traveling in Thailand to open his "Pamparius" pizza parlor outside Oslo in Kolbotn. He decided to rejoin the band as the keyboard player and dancer. His return would be the final touch in the latest incarnation of the band. The new look, sound and album irritated and fascinated the European underground. People were starting to pay attention to Turbonegro.

In December and January, Turbonegro continued touring with 14 more dates in Spain, Portugal, France, Germany and Denmark. The insignia of their stage performance – the bulging denim, make-up, Hank's routine of sticking a lit Roman candle in his butt-crack, Happy-Tom's sailor hat, Euroboy's lithesome and sultry guitar choreography, and Hank's attempts at addressing the audience in their broken native tongue – became Turbonegro's trademarks.

=== Apocalypse Dudes, popularity boom and disbanding (1997–1998) ===
In spring 1997, Turbonegro had another lineup change. Christer Engen (a.k.a. Chris Summers, from BigBang) took over on drums, and they were ready to tour Europe again. This time, they opened up with a modified version of a Grand Funk song, "We are a Norwegian Band". With their next album, Apocalypse Dudes, the band made a musical move into mid-1970s punk and glam territory in the spirit of proto-punk pioneers á la The Dictators, The Ramones or late Iggy & The Stooges, plus a bit of New York Dolls travesty thrown in. As Euroboy explained, "When I came into the band, that added a ’70s rock-n-roll feel that wasn't there before...Turbonegro was just as dirty, but they were certainly more punk rock-driven than (before). We brought the Rolling Stones into the Ramones." It was time to take the new and improved Turbonegro back across the Atlantic with the "Summer of Head" U.S. tour. They were more warmly received this time, but still played only a few shows that were plagued with problems. Nonetheless, after years of stumbling through lineup changes, name changes and various shticks, they finally found themselves.

In the autumn of 1997, their next album Apocalypse Dudes – the first part of the so-called Apocalypse trilogy – was recorded at Endless Sound studios in Oslo with producer Pål Klaastad. When Happy-Tom was asked if their new sound and album had anything to do with Euroboy's entry into the band, he replied, "Yep, he's a genius, and so is our new drummer Chris Summers, The Prince of Drummers. We released the punk album of the millennium with 'Ass Cobra,' and didn't want to make an 'Ass Cobra' part two, plus we spent two years writing new stuff, so as to make sure that every song is a hit, so we ended up making the rock album of the next millennium."

The album was released in March 1998 by Boomba Records. However, it was released in Norway exclusively by Virgin. It is regarded among many fans and critics as their best and most successful album. Moshable magazine wrote, "Apocalypse Dudes is the perfect mix of classic 70's US punk / rock'n'roll like Dictators, Heartbreakers & Ramones... every tune on this release is fucking brilliant". Jello Biafra said, "The new Turbonegro record is possibly the most important European record ever."

Turbonegro supported the album by touring the US in the spring and playing 24 sold-out shows throughout Europe. Kåre João Pedersen of Kåre and the Cavemen substituted for Hank on the US tour as the singer was hospitalized in a mental facility. By fall, the band returned for another 16 European dates on the "Darkness Forever" tour, which was for a long time their last, and ultimately the end of Turbonegro. According to Happy-Tom, "Turbonegro broke up in the waiting room of a psychiatric emergency ward in Milan, Italy." Hank's mental indisposition became a serious problem and, as a result, the remainder of the tour was cancelled. They bid their farewell on 18 December 1998, at Mars in their hometown of Oslo. The last song they performed onstage before they broke up was the final encore "I Am in Love with the Destructive Girls".

=== On hiatus (1999–2002) ===
On the threshold of what was expected to be a major breakthrough for the band, Turbonegro withdrew from the music business and appeared unlikely to ever return. While there were several reasons, Hank von Helvete's drug addiction made it impossible for him to continue. Leaving the band to undergo treatment for heroin dependency, as well as his struggle with depression, von Helvete returned to his childhood town in northern Norway. There, he worked at a Local radio station and as a guide at a Fishing Village Museum. Another reason for Turbonegro's hiatus was that the band was stuck in an oppressive record deal with Boomba. The band saw very little money from the arrangement, and cancelling their tour with Nashville Pussy after playing only half the dates added to their financial problems.

In 1999, Bitzcore Records out of Hamburg bought the contracts from Boomba and began to reissue Turbonegro's entire back-catalogue of albums. The year 1999 also saw the release of a posthumous live album entitled Darkness Forever! It released selections from two of the band's shows in Hamburg and Oslo, documenting Turbonegro's larger-than-life stage antics. Their appreciation among contemporary artists from diverse musical genres as rock, pop, punk and even black metal was displayed on Alpha Motherfuckers, a tribute album to Turbonegro that was compiled over a span of two years and released by Bitzcore in May 2001. The lineup included, among others, Queens of the Stone Age, Nashville Pussy, Therapy?, HIM, Bela B. & Denim Girl (a.k.a. German technopop star Blümchen).

During these four years, the band members would rarely speak; however, the momentum from their previous albums (especially Ass Cobra and Apocalypse Dudes) continued to grow as more and more music fans turned to their music. Unbeknownst to the band, Turbonegro was becoming a cult phenomenon. Fan clubs were established all over the world (see Turbojugend).

The immense following and the tribute album revealed a huge interest that, by audience numbers, hadn't existed before they had quit. When Turbonegro was approached by the organizers of the Norwegian Quart Festival about possible participation in 2002, Turbonegro agreed to the reunion. What was initially meant to be a one-off event to provide an opportunity to the many new fans to witness a Turbonegro performance, finally resulted in the band's reunion. The festival shows received tremendous response.

=== Reforming: new albums, new tours and greater fame (2003–2009) ===
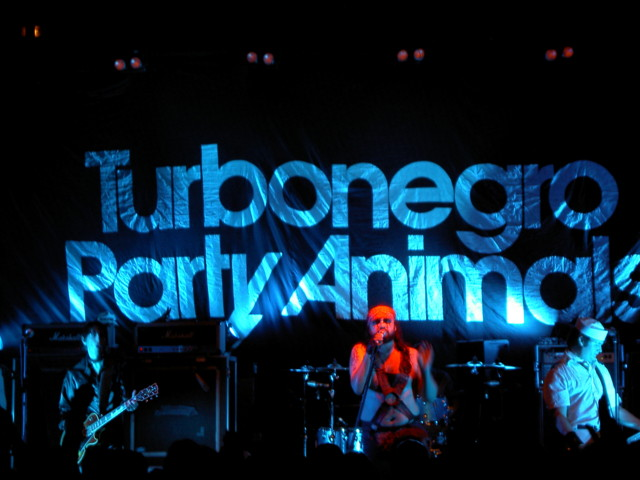
Live at Koko in London, November 2005

Shortly after the Bizarre Festival, the band announced that they signed a record deal for two new albums with Burning Heart Records, an independent record company from Sweden with a long tradition in the punk & hardcore sector. Burning Heart also licensed Turbonegro's most successful albums Ass Cobra and Apocalypse Dudes from Bitzcore and reissued them as digipak CDs with additional video footage from the recent Res-erection show at Quart. Turbonegro appeared in an episode of Viva La Bam during Season 1. The band plays their concert at Bam's West Chester home. Their single, "All My Friends Are Dead", was also used in some episodes of the show.

Turbonegro played 22 U.S. dates in the spring of 2003, culminating in two U.S. shows at The Troubadour in Los Angeles, the first of which sold out in under an hour.

The band released its highly anticipated album, the second installment of the Apocalypse trilogy, Scandinavian Leather in 2003, complete with artwork of a skull Ouroboros from legendary Revolver-designer Klaus Voormann. A U.S. tour with Queens of the Stone Age proved that the American Turbojugend contingent had grown completely out of control, and almost 150 shows later, Turbonegro finished the Scandinavian Leather campaign by selling out the House of Blues in Los Angeles two days in a row in December 2004.

While Scandinavian Leather was recorded at their own Crystal Canyon Studio in Oslo, Turbonegro decided to bring in Steven Shane McDonald as co-producer for Party Animals. This follow-up to 2003s Scandinavian Leather and the last installment in the Apocalypse trilogy was released throughout Europe on 9 May (in Norway 2 May). It continued the 1970s and 1980s glam metal and hard rock-influenced party-oriented deathpunk sound that was first introduced on Apocalypse Dudes. Party Animals was followed by intense touring throughout Europe and, in October, they visited the U.S. A collection of remixes and rarities appeared in 2005 as Small Feces.

Turbonegro went on tour again in 2006 to mostly European locations. In summarizing the band, Happy-Tom said, "Most rock 'n' roll bands start as a riot but end up as a parody. We started up as a parody but ended up as a revolution."

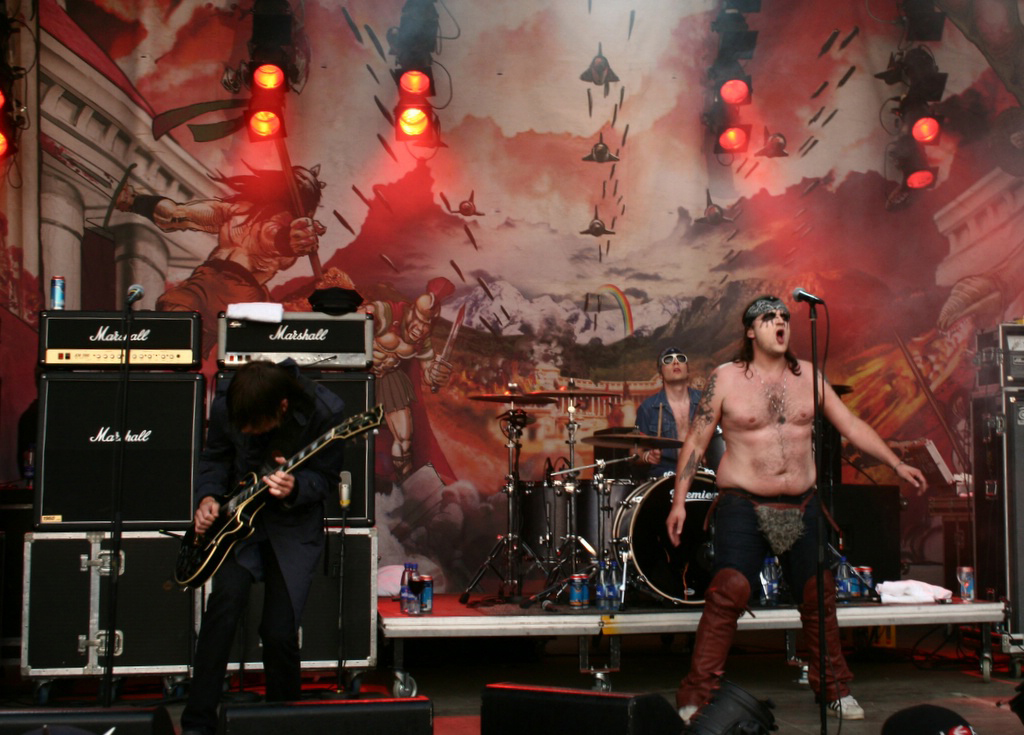
Turbonegro in 2006

On 8 March 2007, the new single "Do You Do You Dig Destruction" was released in Norway. The single was from the album, Retox, released on 13 June 2007.

On 10 July 2007, Turbonegro was one of the warmup bands, alongside HIM, at Metallica's headlining concert at Valle Hovin Stadium in Oslo, Norway.

The band toured Europe in late summer in 2007, including an appearance at Download Festival and 10 intimate gigs in the United Kingdom.

The Turbonegro official site was completely redesigned for the new album release, and the new site debuted on 11 June 2007.

On 27 October 2007, Rune Rebellion played his last live show with Turbonegro in Stavanger, Norway, and subsequently left the band. He said, "The decision was made this summer, realizing I hadn't had time off at all from work or touring for three years." Despite his departure from the position of rhythm guitar, he was still closely collaborating with the band by running their label, Scandinavian Leather Recordings and managing their itinerary.

On 3 March 2008, it was announced that Chris Summers had been asked to leave the band. He had already been gone from the band for six months due to a broken foot. On the band's website, they announced that, "[due to] personal problems and a focus on other projects, we have been forced to ask drummer Chris Summers to resign from Turbonegro." Chris' replacement was announced to be The Vikings drummer Thomas Dahl, who had been filling in for Chris since he broke his foot.

In early 2008, guitarist Euroboy also announced that he and Happy-Tom were working on a new album tentatively titled Tumours. They continued their Retox album tour throughout 2008 and 2009, and on 7 August 2008, Turbonegro celebrated the 10-year anniversary of Apocalypse Dudes by performing the entire album at the Øya Festival in Oslo, Norway.

After finishing their Retox world tour, the band announced through the Turbojugend-Forum that they were going on hiatus for an unknown amount of time.

=== Hank von Helvete's departure and replacement (2010–2011) ===
On 9 July 2010, Norwegian newspapers announced that Hank had left the band. Subsequently, in early December 2010, news broke that a new band featuring Hank von Helvete on vocals had been formed, called Doctor Midnight & the Mercy Cult, with an album to be released in 2011.

Euroboy stated in an interview with "Lydverket" that Turbonegro would appear with Tony Sylvester as the replacement for Hank von Helvete for the first time in Hamburg on 15 July. Former member Rune Rebellion also rejoined the band as rhythm guitarist, while Rune's replacement and former keyboardist Pål Pot went on to become a part-time member, due to family and working commitments.

=== Release of new album and tour (2012–present) ===
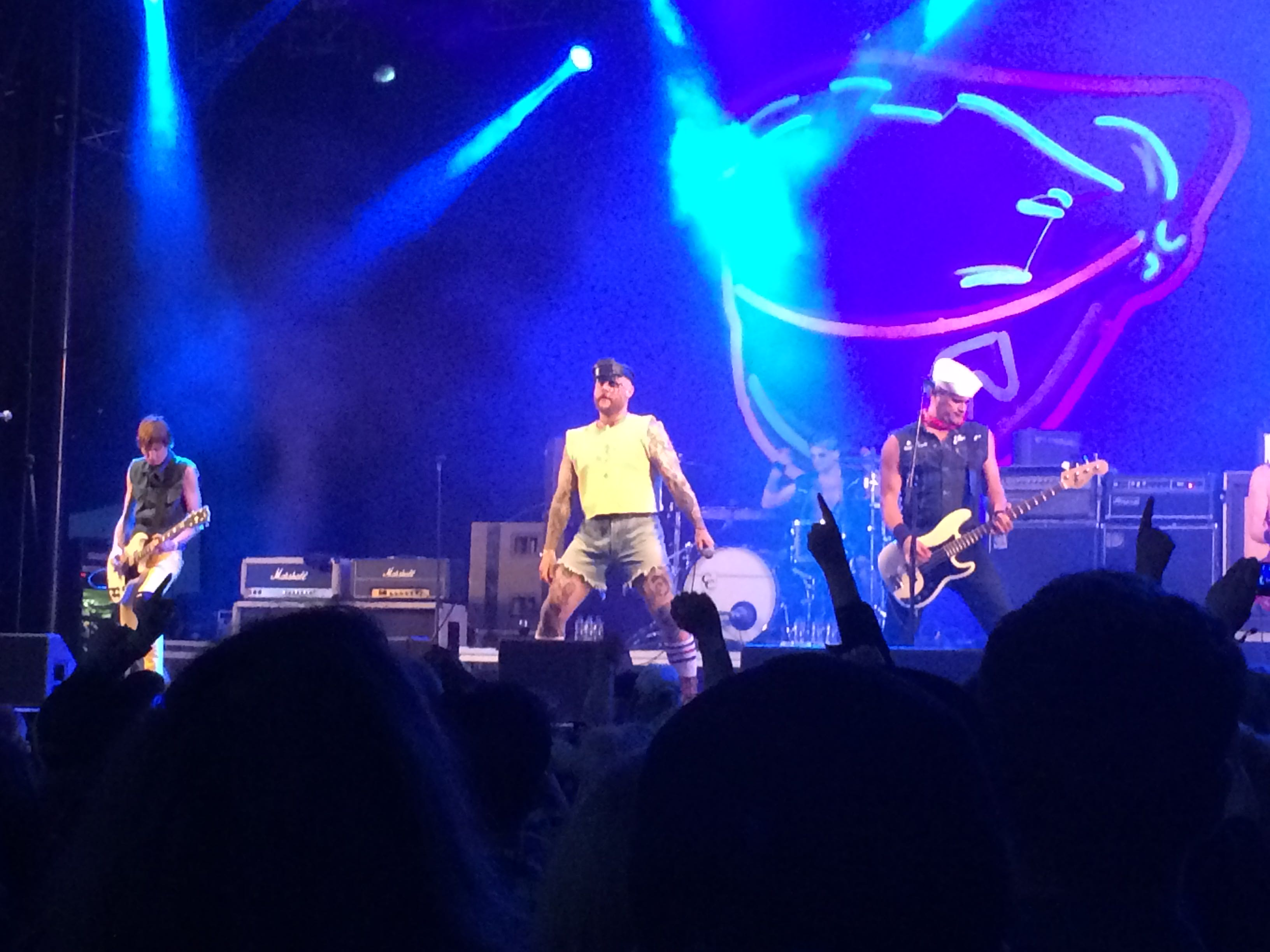
Turbonegro performing at Getaway Festival in Gävle, Sweden, 2015

In May 2012, social networks announced that a new Turbonegro album was about to be released. The new album would be titled Sexual Harassment, and would be released on 13 June 2012, on the Universal Music label for Norway, Sweden and Finland, and Volcom Entertainment for the rest of the world. This announcement was followed by the release of the album's first single "You Give Me Worms" on 4 May. The Album is produced by Matt Sweeney.

In an interview with the Swedish Newspaper Värmlands Folkblad in April 2015, Tony Sylvester says that the band is currently working on new material, but that he can not say when and how the music becomes available.

A later update revealed the album, titled "Rock N' Roll Machine", would be released in February 2018.

Former frontman Hank von Helvete died on 19 November 2021, at the age of 49. His former bandmate Happy-Tom paid tribute to him on social media, as did current Turbonegro frontman Tony "Duke of Nothing" Sylvester, who wrote "I never tried to fill your shoes as that would have been impossible.".

== Musical style ==
Turbonegro's lyrics often attack political correctness. For example, the cover of the single "Bad Mongo" depicts Adolf Hitler as intellectually disabled, and in the song "Hobbit Motherfuckers", they complain that there is "not enough suffering" and "not enough natural selection". Their genre of punk has been self-described as deathpunk. The band has stated that their music superseded existing genres, so they dubbed it "deathpunk" as a way to avoid being pigeonholed into musical groupings they felt they were above. Lyrics referencing the genre choice include "gimme deathpunk baby, and I like it" from the song "Get It On". Sharing characteristics with certain musical predecessors, (Sex Pistols wearing swastikas, etc.), Turbonegro has been praised by some as playing the most up-to-date form of punk with an anarchic blend of humour, shock and sexuality.

In spite of that, Turbonegro have expressed their love for crypto-currency, not only in their song "Zillion Dollar Sadist" or rather in the speeches with which Tony "Duke of Nothing" introduces the song live, making them the most blatant crypto-bros in the punk rock community, even though the song was originally released in 1998. In a recent show in November of 2025 in Cologne, Germany, they introduced the song stating that "they used to be losers too, they were so poor they had to jerk off in order to feed the cat... until they started investing in crypto-currency".

In the Turbonegro – The Movie DVD extras, Happy-Tom says that, early on, festival-goers expected Turbonegro to be gothic metal or black metal in the vein of other Norwegian bands. They are notorious for their on-stage gimmicks. An early version of the band wore blackface and wigs onstage in an effort to challenge those watching their shows. On The Reserection DVD, the band states that early on they were often driven away from shows they were to play because they were not edgy enough or did not fit the look that the crowd wanted. As a result, the onstage schticks started to become as much of the Turbonegro experience as the music. Following several tours in blackface, the band started an oddball theme of tight denim pants, nautically themed stage props and homosexual innuendo, stylistically similar to the characters of Tom of Finland. A tongue-in-cheek joke, the homosexual/transvestite stage presence found its way into the band's music, including songs such as "Prince of the Rodeo" and "Rendezvous with Anus". Levi's jeans endorsements soon followed, and the trucker-cut jacket soon became standard fare among fans.

The band's first break-out album, Ass Cobra (1996), was widely acclaimed. Jello Biafra would later comment that it was one of the best punk albums of the 1990s. Following Ass Cobra, was Turbonegro's most critically acclaimed release Apocalypse Dudes (1998). Apocalypse Dudes introduced a combination of 1970s arena rock, irreverent lyrics, and punk stylings, which brought the band a level of notoriety that they had not achieved at any other point in their career.

Among the band's main influences are Black Flag, the Rolling Stones, Kiss, Venom, Radio Birdman, AC/DC, Iggy Pop & James Williamson, Circle Jerks, David Bowie, Ramones, the Lewd, Hanoi Rocks, Alice Cooper, Negazione, the Dictators and the Stooges.

== Band name ==
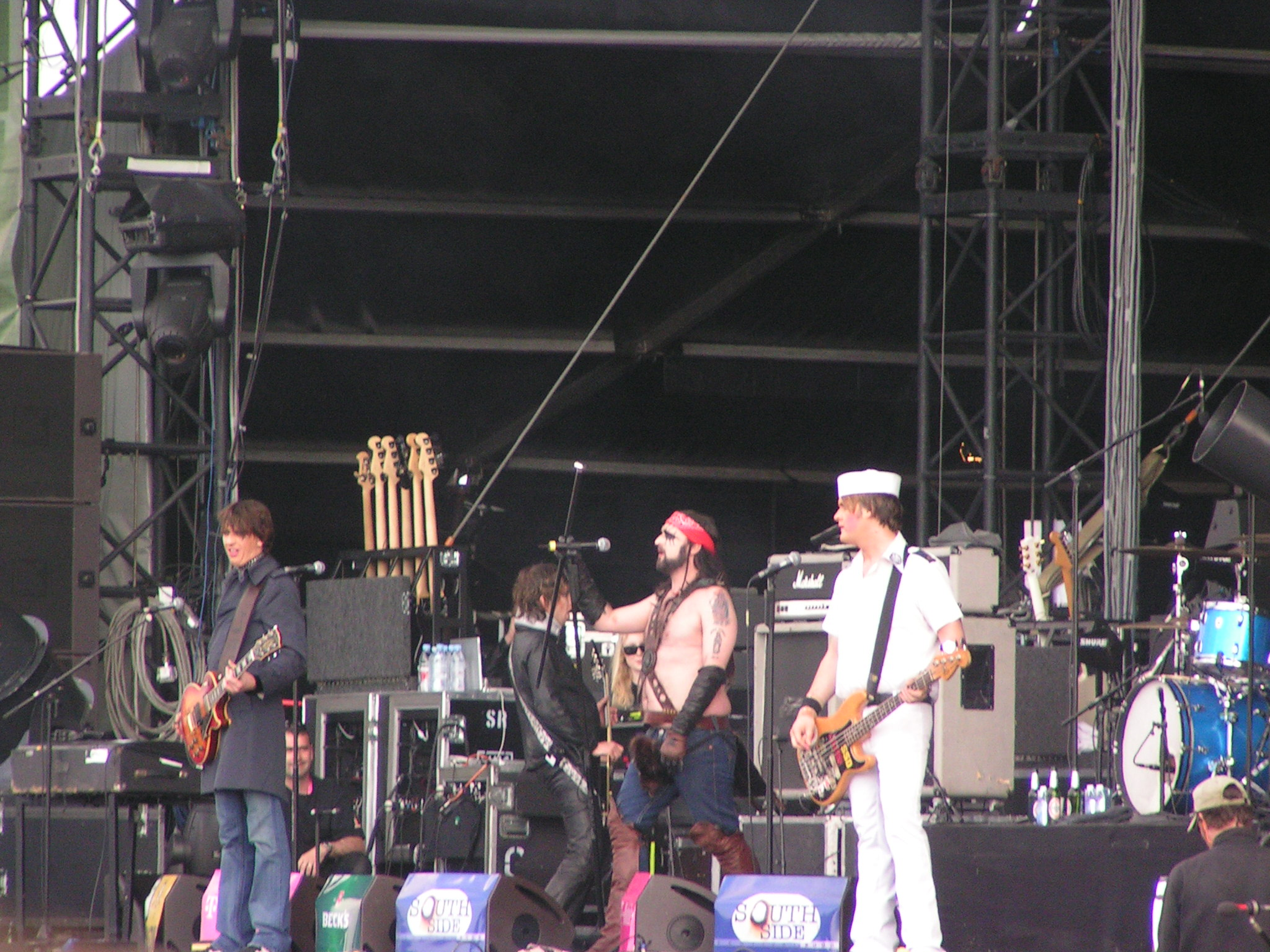
Turbonegro playing at the Southside Festival in 2005

Initially, the band had two running ideas for band names: Nazipenis and Turbonegro. They were advised that a band named Nazipenis would never sell records, so they chose Turbonegro as a more consumer-friendly choice. The band's name raised some eyebrows and, for that reason, their first releases were sometimes branded "TRBNGR", perhaps to preclude backlash against what some consider to be a racist name. However, the band's stated motivations are anti-racist, an attempt to change the attitude of racism and nationalism perceived as prevalent in parts of Scandinavia.

According to lead guitarist Euroboy, the band name also has a peculiar origin. "I think Pål saw it spray-painted on a brick wall in a tube-station in a suburb of Oslo back in the day. It's actually two Latin words. It means 'fast' and 'black,' and we thought that was a cool name for a band. Because our music is very fast and very dark. And also, it's a name for a color. In the car industry, it's the name for the paint, for the darkest paint. If you want to paint your car black, the most black colour of all is Turbonegro."

== Turbojugend ==
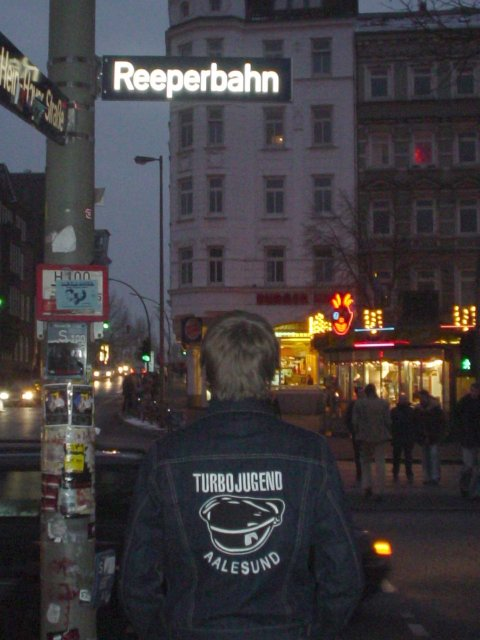
A Turbojugend from Ålesund on Reeperbahn

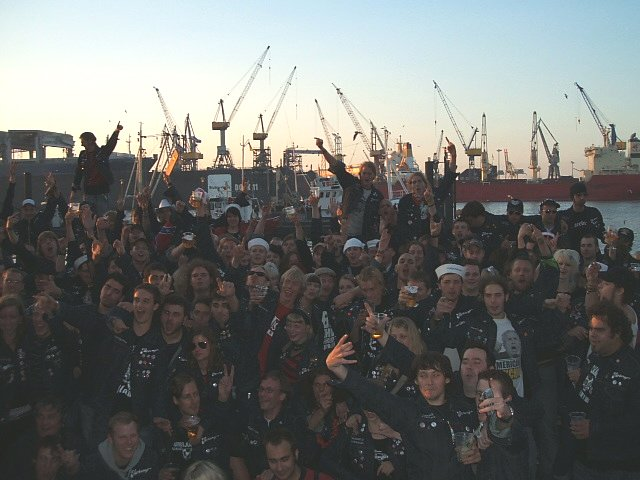
Group photo of Turbojugend Members at the "Welt-Turbojugend-Tage" 2006

A feature of Turbonegro's fan base is the Turbojugend (Turbo Youth), the band's fan club. In explaining Turbojugend's beginnings, Euroboy said, "We thought about how Kiss had the Kiss Army so we thought that Turbonegro should have our own Navy. It started as a joke in Happy-Tom’s apartment. We put his address on the album sleeves and it was all just for laughs. The Jugend blossomed into something way bigger than we ever expected." The first Turbojugend chapter started in St Pauli, Hamburg, Germany, with later chapters appearing throughout the world, St. Pauli being the unofficial capital. Chapter members identify themselves by wearing specially made denim jackets with the Turbonegro logo and "Turbojugend [name of chapter]" stitched on the back.

The logo of Turbojugend Oslo can be found on almost every album Turbonegro has ever released.

=== Welt-Turbojugend-Tage ===
Once a year, Turbojugends from all over the world meet in St. Pauli, Germany, to celebrate Turbonegro, themselves, and punk rock in general during a two-day event, called "Welt-Turbojugend-Tage" (in English: "World Turboyouth Days"), with concerts and meetings in different clubs. Welt-Turbojugend-Tage 7, in July 2011, featured the comeback of Turbonegro. The eighth annual event was held in July 2012, and another was scheduled for August 2013.

== Band members ==
=== Current members ===
- Thomas Seltzer (a.k.a. "Happy-Tom", also "Tom of Norway", "Bongo" and "Bongo Neger") – bass (1989–1990, 1996–1998, 2002–2010, 2011–present), drums (1990–1996)
- Rune Grønn (a.k.a. "Rune Rebellion", also "Rune Protude", "Loonie", "Thee Oi Boy!", "Brune" and "Brune Neger") – guitar (1989–1998, 2002–2007, 2011–present)
- Knut Schreiner (a.k.a. "Euroboy") – guitar (1996–1998, 2002–2010, 2011–present)
- Anthony "Tony" Madsen-Sylvester (a.k.a. "The Duke of Nothing", also "Ceasar Proud") – vocals (2011–present)
- Tommy Akerholdt (a.k.a. "Tommy Manboy") – drums (2011–present)
- Haakon-Marius Pettersen (a.k.a. "Crown Prince Haakon-Marius") – keyboards (2015–present)

=== Former members ===
- Pål Bøttger Kjærnes (a.k.a. "Pål Pot Pamparius", also "L. Ron Bud", "Bod El Stud", "Toonie", "Herr Würst Neger" and "Max Neger") – guitar/keyboards/percussion (1989–1998, 2002–2010, 2011–2012)
- Pål Erik Carlin – vocals (1989–1990)
- Vegard Heskestad – guitar (1989–1990)
- Tor Kristian Jenssen (a.k.a. "TK") – drums (1989)
- Carlos Carrasco – drums (1989–1990)
- Harald Fossberg (a.k.a. "Harry Neger", also "Hare Neger" and "Harold Neger") – vocals (1990–1993)
- Ole Martin Martinsen – bass (1990–1991)
- Bengt Calmeyer (a.k.a. "Bingo", also "Bingo Neger", "Bingo El Bailar" and "Panky") – bass (1991–1996)
- Hans Erik Dyvik Husby (a.k.a. "Hank von Helvete", also "Hank Herzog von Helvete", "Hank from Hell", "Hertugen", "Herr Tugen", "Hertis", "Hanky El Magnifico", "Frank Hank" and "Hanky") – vocals (1993–1998, 2002–2010; died 2021)
- Anders Gerner (a.k.a. "André Grandeur") – drums (1996)
- Christer Engen (a.k.a. "Chris Summers", also "The Rolex of Drummers" and "The Prince of Drummers") – drums (1997–1998, 2002–2008)
- Tomas Dahl (a.k.a. "Caddy" and "T.D.") – drums (2008–2010; touring member 2007–2008)

=== Others ===
- Kåre João Pedersen – vocals (live) (1998)

== Discography ==
=== Studio albums ===
- Hot Cars and Spent Contraceptives (1992)
- Never Is Forever (1994)
- Ass Cobra (1996)
- Apocalypse Dudes (1998)
- Scandinavian Leather (2003)
- Party Animals (2005)
- Retox (2007)
- Sexual Harassment (2012)
- RockNRoll Machine (2018)

=== Live albums ===
- Darkness Forever! (1999)

=== Compilation albums ===
- Love It to Deathpunk (2001)
- Small Feces (2005)

=== Tribute albums ===
- Alpha Motherfuckers: A Tribute to Turbonegro (2001)
- Los Suaves Negroes: A Lounge and Bossa Tribute to Turbonegro (2007)
- Omega Motherfuckers: A Tribute to Turbonegro (2013)

=== Studio EPs ===
- Turboloid (1990)
- (He's a) Grunge Whore (1993)

== Side projects ==
- The Vikings – 1990s project that featured Thomas Seltzer, Knut Schreiner and Tomas Dahl.
- Oslo Motherfuckers – early 2000s project that featured Christer Engen and Thomas Seltzer.
- Kåre and the Cavemen (formerly known as Euroboys) – sideproject of Knut Schreiner.
- Mirror Lakes – project that featured Knut Schreiner and members of Euroboys, Serena Maneesh, I Was a King, Heroes & Zeros and Hello Goodbye.
- SCUM – sideproject featuring Thomas Seltzer and members of Amen, Emperor, and Mindgrinder.
- Black Diamond Brigade – a one-off collaboration between Knut Schreiner, Billy Gould (Faith No More), Sigurd "Satyr" Wongraven (Satyricon), Torgny Amdam (Amulet) and Tarjei Strom (Ralph Myerz).
- Doctor Midnight & The Mercy Cult – short-lived Scandinavian supergroup that featured Hank Von Helvete and members of Marilyn Manson, Cadaver, The Kovenant and Extol.

Awards
Preceded by Madrugada	Recipient of the Rock Spellemannprisen; 2003	Succeeded by WE
