= Mirror Lakes (band) =

Norwegian band

- Origin: Norway
- Years active: 2010–present
- Label: Warner
- Members: Knut Schreiner; Frode Fivel; Trond Mjøen; Havard Krogedal; Arne Mathisen

Mirror Lakes is a Norwegian band established by guitar player Knut Schreiner (from Euroboys, Turbonegro) and Frode Fivel (solo singer, also member of Hello Goodbye) as lead acts of the band, after they met at a concert in Oslo. Soon Trond Mjøen, a previous colleague of Schreiner also from Euroboys joined in. Later bass player Havard Krogedal (from I Was a King and Loch Ness Mouse) joined, so did drummer Arne Mathisen (from Heroes & Zeros and PowPow).

Making gigs since 2010 and signed to Warner Music, they released their eponymous debut album Mirror Lakes, a double album with 17 tracks recorded in Gothenburg, Oslo and New York.

== Members ==
- Frode Fivel - vocals
- Knut Schreiner - guitar
- Trond Mjøen - guitar
- Håvard Krogedal - bass
- Arne Mathisen - drums

== Discography ==
=== Albums ===
Year	Album	Peak position	Certifications	Notes
Year	Album	NOR	Certifications	Notes
2012	Mirror Lakes	30		
