= Euroboy =

Euroboy may refer to:

- Euroboy, the stage name of Knut Schreiner, a Norwegian musician
- Euroboys, a Norwegian band
- "Euroboy" (song), a song by the Pet Shop Boys
- Euroboy (magazine), a former gay pornographic magazine published by Millivres Prowler Group (MPG)
