= Alpha Motherfuckers =

Alpha Motherfuckers – A Tribute to Turbonegro

Compilation album (tribute album) by various artists
- Released: 9 June 2001 (Germany); June 2001 (US); 2001 (Australia)
- Recorded: 2000–2001
- Genres: Hard rock; punk
- Length: 75:15
- Labels: Bitzcore, Hopeless, Tilt

Alpha Motherfuckers – A Tribute to Turbonegro is a various artists tribute album featuring covers of the Norwegian band Turbonegro. The collection was assembled by Bitzcore label owner and worldwide Turbojugend president Jürgen "El Presidente" Goldschmitt after the label bought and began reissuing Turbonegro's music catalog. The album was released on 9 June 2001 in Germany through Bitzcore and on 18 June 2001 in the US through Hopeless. It was released later that year in Australia through Tilt.

The artists on the album range from major bands, including Queens of the Stone Age, HIM, Satyricon and Therapy?, to punk and hardcore bands, such as The Real McKenzies, The Dwarves and The Supersuckers, and lesser known Scandinavian artists. The covers were recorded between mid-2000 and May 2001.

The different editions of the album include a German limited first pressing that included a bonus disc of leftover covers; a US version that includes one bonus track from the German limited bonus disc; and an Australian version with an identical tracklist to the later German editions.

== Track listing ==
No.	Title	Artist	Length
1.	"The Age of Pamparius"	Nashville Pussy	5:50
2.	"Denim Demon"	Therapy?	2:14
3.	"Hate the Kids"	Amulet	2:51
4.	"Get It On"	Supersuckers	3:57
5.	"Are You Ready for Some Darkness?"	Bela B. & Denim Girl	3:39
6.	"Back to Dungaree High"	Queens of the Stone Age	3:04
7.	"Rendezvous with Anus"	HIM	3:17
8.	"I Got Erection"	Satyricon	2:27
9.	"No Beast So Fierce"	Maryslim	4:18
10.	"Rock Against Ass"	Scot Free	3:28
11.	"Sailor Man"	Nullskattesnylterne	1:59
12.	"Prince of the Rodeo"	Hot Water Music	3:34
13.	"Bad Mongo"	Griffin	2:42
14.	"Midnight NAMBLA"	Zeke	1:22
15.	"Just Flesh"	Peepshows	2:13
16.	"Don't Say Motherfucker, Motherfucker"	Spacebitch	1:46
17.	"He's a Grungewhore"	Motorpsycho	5:24
18.	"Good Head"	ADZ	2:48
19.	"Hobbit Motherfuckers"	The Dwarves / Splittin Wix	1:33
20.	"Zonked Out on Hashish"	Puffball	1:53
21.	"Hobbit Motherfuckers"	Motosierra	1:00
22.	"(I Fucked) Betty Page (Galician lyrics)"	Samesugas	2:28
23.	"Suburban Anti-Christ"	Ratos de Porão	1:51
24.	"Sailor Man"	Real McKenzies	1:58
25.	"Prince of the Rodeo"	Toby Dammit	5:14

German limited edition bonus disc
No.	Title	Artist	Length
1.	"The Age of Pamparius"	Scot Free
2.	"I Got Erection"	Moral Hazard
3.	"Black Chrome"	Red Hot Lovers
4.	"Destination Hell"	The Gravy Boys
5.	"Selfdestructo Bust"	Scared of Chaka
6.	"Toodlepip Fuck"	Jerry Spider Gang
7.	"Selfdestructo Bust"	Three Years Down
8.	"Don't say Motherfucker, Motherfucker"	Peter Pan
9.	"I'm in Love with the Destructive Girls (German lyrics)"	Cellophane Suckers
10.	"Gut bläst (aka Good Head) (German lyrics)"	Prollhead!

US edition
No.	Title	Artist	Length
1.	"The Age of Pamparius"	Nashville Pussy	5:50
2.	"Denim Demon"	Therapy?	2:14
3.	"Hate the Kids"	Amulet	2:51
4.	"Get It On"	Supersuckers	3:57
5.	"Selfdestructo Bust"	Scared of Chaka	2:21
6.	"Are You Ready for Some Darkness?"	Bela B. & Denim Girl	3:39
7.	"Back to Dungaree High"	Queens of the Stone Age	3:04
8.	"Rendezvous with Anus"	HIM	3:17
9.	"I Got Erection"	Satyricon	2:27
10.	"No Beast So Fierce"	Maryslim	4:18
11.	"Rock Against Ass"	Scot Free	3:28
12.	"Sailor Man"	Nullskattesnylterne	1:59
13.	"Prince of the Rodeo"	Hot Water Music	3:34
14.	"Bad Mongo"	Griffin	2:42
15.	"Midnight NAMBLA"	Zeke	1:22
16.	"Just Flesh"	Peepshows	2:13
17.	"Don't Say Motherfucker, Motherfucker"	Spacebitch	1:46
18.	"He's a Grungewhore"	Motorpsycho	5:24
19.	"Good Head"	ADZ	2:48
20.	"Hobbit Motherfuckers"	The Dwarves / Splittin Wix	1:33
21.	"Zonked Out on Hashish"	Puffball	1:53
22.	"Hobbit Motherfuckers"	Motosierra	1:00
23.	"(I Fucked) Betty Page (Galician lyrics)"	Samesugas	2:28
24.	"Suburban Anti-Christ"	Ratos de Porão	1:51
25.	"Sailor Man"	Real McKenzies	1:58
26.	"Prince of the Rodeo"	Toby Dammit	5:14

== Credits ==
- Frank Kozik – artwork
- El Presidente – compilation producer
- Hank Herzog Van Helvete – liner notes
- Master & Servant – mastering
