= Darkness Forever! =

Live album by Turbonegro
- Released: August 1999
- Recorded: 10 May, 18 December 1998
- Studio: Fabrik, Hamburg, Germany & Mars, Oslo, Norway
- Genre: Glam punk
- Length: 71:22
- Label: Bitzcore Records (1999 version and 2005 re-press); Get Hip Records (US, 2000)

Turbonegro chronology
Apocalypse Dudes (1998)	Darkness Forever! (1999)	Scandinavian Leather (2003)

Professional ratings
Review scores
Source	Rating
AllMusic	3/5 stars

Darkness Forever! is a live album by the Norwegian rock band Turbonegro, recorded in 1998 and released in 1999 on Bitzcore Records in Germany and on Get Hip Records in 2000 in the United States. It was recorded on 10 May 1998 at Fabrik in Hamburg, Germany and on 18 December 1998 at Mars in Oslo, Norway, which was the last show of Turbonegro before they disbanded and went on hiatus for four years. There are no overdubs whatsoever on this album.

The album was re-released in May 2005 as a six-panel digipak with extended photo material. It contains five bonus songs that was previously included in the vinyl edition and has been remastered.

== Artwork ==
The artwork of the front sleeve was culled from a 70s poster advertising for "The Magic Show" of Canadian magician Doug Henning. The original CD pressing came with a free "Turbojugend" sticker. The limited first edition vinyl pressing (only 3,000 copies) came with the A1 poster from the band's last tour (European "Darkness Forever" tour with Nashville Pussy) designed by Frank Kozik. The edition included five additional tracks and the sleeve had special relief printing on the cover.

== Track listing ==
No.	Title	Length
1.	"The Age of Pamparius"	6:45
2.	"Back to Dungaree High"	3:02
3.	"Get It On"	4:01
4.	"Just Flesh"	3:15
5.	"Don't Say Motherfucker, Motherfucker"	2:14
6.	"The Midnight NAMBLA"	2:03
7.	"Sailor Man"	2:17
8.	"Rendezvous with Anus"	2:28
9.	"Are Your Ready (for Some Darkness)"	4:09
10.	"Selfdestructo Bust"	3:07
11.	"Rock Against Ass"	3:58
12.	"Prince of the Rodeo"	4:19
13.	"Monkey on Your Back"	3:08
14.	"Denim Demon"	2:10
15.	"I Got Erection"	8:35

Limited vinyl edition, US edition and 2005 reissue bonus tracks
No.	Title	Length
16.	"Bad Mongo"	3:08
17.	"Zillion Dollar Sadist"	3:26
18.	"Death Time"	2:17
19.	"Hobbit Motherfuckers"	1:18
20.	"Good Head"	5:42

== Personnel ==
- Hank Von Helvete (Hans Erik Dyvik Husby) – vocals
- Euroboy (Knut Schreiner) – lead guitar
- Rune Rebellion (Rune Grønn) – rhythm guitar
- Pål Pot Pamparius (Pål Bottger Kjærnes) – keyboards, percussion
- Happy-Tom (Thomas Seltzer) – bass
- Chris Summers (Christer Engen) – drums

=== Production ===
- Dimitri – layout assistance
- Phranc Kozic – cover design
- Sven Peks – recorder and mixer, Hamburg, Germany
- Michael Wehr – recorder and mixer, Oslo, Norway
- Tom Kvalsvoll – mastering at Strype Audio
- Alex Kayiambakis – photography
- Lord Bard – photography
