= Small Feces =

Compilation album by Turbonegro
- Released: April 2005
- Genre: Glam punk, hard rock
- Length: 119:45
- Label: Bitzcore Records

Turbonegro chronology
| Party Animals (2005) | Small Feces (2005) | Retox (2007) |

Vol. 1 cover

Vol. 2 cover

Vol. 1 vinyl cover

Vol. 2 vinyl cover

Small Feces is a two-part compilation album by the Norwegian rock band Turbonegro, released in 2005 on Bitzcore Records. It features 42 songs and documents the first steps from the beginning in 1989 until the Ass Cobra times ca.1997. It contains a lot of unreleased/unheard material, 7-inches, compilation tracks and other gems. Most of the songs have never been available on CD format before, are re-mixed and re-mastered.

The first edition was released in April 2005, limited to 1,000 copies. It is a three-CD box set with a cardboard box. The three digi-packed CDs consist of:

- Disc 1: 19 tracks (with more of the later stuff)
- Disc 2: 23 tracks (the early period)
- Disc 3: CD ROM with assorted press stuff/articles.
- Plus detailed booklet with a chronological song guide, liner notes, discography, illustrations.

A 12-inch vinyl version was released in December 2005. These were 300 hand numbered mail-order-only copies on lime green wax w/ traces of white swirl. It contains a four-page folder with many pictures, a song guide and the band's history.

Small Feces includes basically all the exclusive songs from Turbonegro's many vinyl-only releases starting with their debut single Route Zero and the Turboloid EP on Straitjacket Records, the Vaya Con Satan single on Sympathy, continuing with several bonus tracks and b-sides from their records for Sympathy, Munster, Big Ball, Hit Me! and Bad Afro plus a handful of songs released solely on compilations. We also get 8 never released outtakes from recording sessions between 1989 and 1994, and also included are four songs from a 1995 live show in Copenhagen, Denmark, and the two songs of Turbonegro's Computech cassette which were recorded at their first ever rehearsal in January 1989.

There are misspellings of the band name on the covers of Vol. 1 and 2 in the three-CD box set. The error reads 'TBRNGR' when in fact it should read 'TRBNGR'.

== Track listing (CD version) ==
=== Volume 1: Feces ===
1. "The Party Starts Now" (Manitoba's Wild Kingdom cover)
2. "Toodlepip Fuck" (Prince Of The Rodeo 7-inch b-side)
3. "Prince of the Rodeo" (7-inch Single version)
4. "Hush, Earthling" (unreleased & much rougher alt. take)
5. "Suffragette City" (David Bowie cover – 7-inch Single)
6. "I Don't Care About You" (Fear cover – unreleased, outtake 1994)
7. "Sailor Man" (re-mix with boosted bass guitar)
8. "(I Fucked) Betty Page" (Denim Demon 7-inch b-side)
9. "Gimme Shelter" (The Rolling Stones cover – unreleased, outtake 1994)
10. "Flabby Sagging Flesh" (Anal Babes cover – split 7-inch w/ Anal Babes)
11. "Kærlighetens Børn" (Suffragette City 7-inch b-side)
12. "Kick It Out" (unreleased, outtake 1993)
13. "Let It Burn" (unreleased, outtake 1993)
14. "My Hometown" (unreleased, outtake 1994)
15. "Staten Och Kapitalet" (Ebba Grön cover, outtake 1993)
16. "I Got Erection" (St. Pauli version)
17. "Screwed & Tattooed"
18. "Young Boys' Feet" (The Dicks cover)
19. "War on the Terraces" (Cockney Rejects cover)

The song material on disc 1 presents the studio recordings of the Turbonegro line-up with Hank on vocals, most of this material was mastered from the original tapes handed over to Bitzcore by Turbonegro's long-time recording engineer Christian Calmeyer.

=== Volume 2: Small ===
1. "Six Pack" (Black Flag cover – He's a Grungewhore EP)
2. "Cop Kennel" (unreleased, outtake 1992)
3. "No Rule" (Leather Nun cover)
4. "Jeg Will Bly Som Jesus" (Kjøtt cover)
5. "Starship" (MC5 cover, unreleased, outtake 1989)
6. "Just to Get Away" (Poison Idea cover – unreleased, live 1995)
7. "I'm In Love with the Destructive Girl" (live 1995)
8. "Hot Cars" (live 1995)
9. "I Walked with a Zombie" (Roky Erickson cover / uncredited "Du er en dritt" (Rough Trade cover – unreleased, live 1995)
10. "Vaya Con Satan" (7-inch version)
11. "Zonked Out (On Hashish)" (7-inch version)
12. "Hand of Love" (7-inch version)
13. "Flower Box"
14. "Search & Destroy" (Iggy and the Stooges cover, live 1992)
15. "Route Zero"
16. "Let's Go to Mars"
17. "You Had It Coming"
18. "Cockwork"
19. "Love in My Veins"
20. "I Want You Right Now" (MC5 cover)
21. "Booth Theme"
22. "Killer Penis" (Computech cassette)
23. "1970 (I Feel Alright)" (The Stooges cover, Computech cassette)

Disc 2 has studio material that dates before 1993 with former vocalists Harald Fossberg and Pål Erik Carlin.

== Track listing (vinyl version) ==
=== Volume 1 ===
Side A

1. "The Party Starts Now" – 2:38
2. "Toodlepip Fuck" – 2:34
3. "Prince of the Rodeo" – 3:41
4. "Hush Earthling" – 3:18
5. "Suffragette City" – 2:52
6. "I Don't Care About You" – 1:12
7. "(I Fucked) Betty Page" – 2:33
8. "Gimme Shelter" – 3:57

Total running time – 22:07 mins

Side B

1. "Flabby Sagging Flesh" – 1:59
2. "Kick It Out" – 2:22
3. "Let It Burn" – 2:14
4. "My Hometown" – 1:35
5. "Staten Och Kapitalet" – 5:26
6. "Screwed & Tattooed" – 3:22
7. "Young Boys Feet" – 1:11
8. "War on the Terraces" – 3:17

Total running time – 21:04 mins

=== Volume 2 ===
Side A

1. "Six Pack" – 2:39
2. "Sailor Man" – 1:57
3. "I Got Erection" (St. Pauli version) – 2:22
4. "Kærlighetens Børn" – 4:10
5. "Cop Kennel" – 2:32
6. "No Rule" – 2:33
7. "Jeg Will Bly Som Jesus" – 4:29

Total running time – 20:07 mins

Side B

1. "Starship" – 5:01
2. "I'm in Love with the Destructive Girl" – 1:57
3. "Hot Cars" – 2:29
4. "Zonked Out (On Hashish)" – 2:20
5. "Hand of Love" – 2:02
6. "Flower Box" – 2:15
7. "Let's Go to Mars" – 2:07
8. "Cockwork" – 2:50

Total running time – 21 mins

The song "Staten Och Kapitalet" was included as a hidden track on Never Is Forever but was made an a cappella piece by dropping out the instrumentation. Singing is bass player at the time Bengt 'Bingo' Calmeyer.

== Credits ==
- Ron Firehouse – artwork
