= Sexual harassment (disambiguation) =

Sexual harassment is a form of intimidation or coercion of a sexual nature.

Sexual Harassment may also refer to:

- Sexual Harassment (album), a 2012 album by Norwegian band Turbonegro
- "Sexual Harassment" (The Office), an episode of The Office
- "Sexual Harassment" (Beavis and Butt-head episode)
- Sexual Harassment (musical act), known for their 1980's hit "I Need a Freak"
- "Sexual Harassment in the Workplace", a track on Frank Zappa's album Guitar

== See also ==
- My Sexual Harassment, yaoi anime
- Sexual Harassment of Women at Workplace (Prevention, Prohibition and Redressal) Act, 2013, India
