= Scandinavian Leather =

Studio album by Turbonegro
- Released: 28 April 2003
- Recorded: November 2002 – December 2002
- Studio: Crystal Canyon, Oslo
- Genre: Glam punk, hard rock
- Length: 46:24
- Label: Burning Heart Records
- Producer: Knut Schreiner, Turbonegro

Turbonegro chronology
Darkness Forever! (1999)	Scandinavian Leather (2003)	Party Animals (2005)

Singles from Scandinavian Leather
- 1. "Fuck the World" Released: 12 May 2003; 2. "Locked Down" Released: 18 August 2003; 3. "Sell Your Body (to the Night)" Released: 1 September 2003

Professional ratings
Review scores
Source	Rating
AllMusic	4/5 stars
Pitchfork Media	(2.3/10)
Rolling Stone	3/5 stars

Scandinavian Leather is an album by the Norwegian band Turbonegro that followed the band's reunion in 2002 and was released in April 2003 on Burning Heart Records in Sweden, on Bitzcore Records in Germany, on JVC/Victor Records in Japan, and on 6 May 2003 on Epitaph Records in the United States.

== Music and lyrics ==
With Scandinavian Leather Turbonegro returned to a more rock style, continuing that found on Apocalypse Dudes with a development of the 'deathpunk' sound. While the songwriting is reminiscent of that of the Ramones, the sound is more multi-layered, including string arrangements, harmonic backing vocals, arena rock influences and psychedelic undertones, which the band coined "Rainbow Rock", or deathpunk with a pop sensibility.

== Track listing ==
All tracks are written by Turbonegro.

No.	Title	Length
1.	"The Blizzard of Flames" (intro)	1:57
2.	"Wipe It 'Til It Bleeds"	3:43
3.	"Gimme Some"	3:11
4.	"Turbonegro Must Be Destroyed"	3:10
5.	"Sell Your Body (to the Night)"	4:29
6.	"Remain Untamed"	4:16
7.	"Train of Flesh"	3:46
8.	"Fuck the World (F.T.W.)"	4:12
9.	"Locked Down"	3:21
10.	"I Want Everything"	2:51
11.	"Drenched in Blood (D.I.B.)"	3:58
12.	"Le Saboteur"	2:56
13.	"Ride with Us"	4:34
Total length:		46:24

== Personnel ==
- Hank von Helvete (Hans Erik Dyvik Husby) – vocals
- Euroboy (Knut Schreiner) – lead guitar
- Rune Rebellion (Rune Grønn) – rhythm guitar
- Pål Pot Pamparius (Pål Bottger Kjærnes) – keyboards, saxophone, percussion
- Happy-Tom (Thomas Seltzer) – bass
- Chris Summers (Christer Engen) – drums

=== Additional musicians ===
- Kristian "Krisvaag" Kirkvaag – drums and arrangements on "The Blizzard of Flames" with Chris Summers
- Odd The God – backing vocals on "The Blizzard of Flames" with Happy-Tom
- Ivar Winther – flute on "Wipe It 'Til It Bleeds"
- Mariann Thomassen – additional backing vocals on "Train of Flesh"
- Lars Horntvedt – string arrangements on "Locked Down" with Euroboy
- Tomas Dahl – additional backing vocals on "Drenched in Blood (D.I.B.)"
- Torgny Amdam – additional backing vocals on "Ride with Us"

=== Production ===
- Jürgen Goldschmitt – executive producer
- Anders Møller – engineer
- Marius Bodin Larsen – engineer
- Stefan Boman – recording engineer (additional)
- Joe Barresi – mixing
- Henke Jonsson – mastering
- Daniel Krieger – lacquer cutting
- Sebastian Ludvigsen – photography
- Klaus Voormann – cover art
- Tobbe Barth – layout
- Trond Sættem – director (live footage and documentary)
- Erik Ohlsson – DVD animations and menu
- Jesper Eriksson – DVD authoring and mastering
