= Retox (album) =

Studio album by Turbonegro
- Released: 11 June 2007
- Recorded: May–December 2006
- Studio: Crystal Canyon Studio & Fagerborg Lydstudio (Oslo, Norway)
- Genre: Glam punk, hard rock
- Length: 44:01
- Label: Scandinavian Leather Recordings (Norway); Playground Music (Sweden); Edel Music (Europe); Bitzcore Records (Germany); Shock Records (Australia); Cooking Vinyl (UK & US)
- Producer: Turbonegro

Turbonegro chronology
Small Feces (2005)	Retox (2007)	Sexual Harassment (2012)

Singles from Retox
- 1. "Do You Do You Dig Destruction" Released: March 2007

Professional ratings
Review scores
Source	Rating
AllMusic	4/5 stars

Retox is the seventh album by Norwegian rock band Turbonegro. It is the first release under the band's newly created Scandinavian Leather Recordings. Retox is the final Turbonegro album to feature vocalist Hank von Helvete, guitarist and keyboardist Pål Pot Pamparius and drummer Chris Summers.The album was released on 11 June 2007 in Norway, 13 June 2007 in Sweden and on 15 June 2007 in the rest of Europe except for the UK. It was released on 23 June 2007 in Australia, 9 July 2007 in the UK and 14 August 2007 in the US.

Turbonegro described the album as "a nihilistic homo punk metal bikermovie: Full of speed, power, humiliation and freedom! Retox is rock music that's been up for 5 days without sleeping, able to see more than most people, but not seeing anything exactly clear."

== Recording and release ==
In May 2006, the band started recording demos at Crystal Canyon Studio, before moving to Fagerborg Lydstudio for the recording of the basic tracks and returning to Crystal Canyon to finalize the recordings. In January 2007, guitarist Knut Schreiner, bassist Thomas Seltzer and drummer Chris Summers travelled to the United States to mix the album with John Agnello at Water Music and The Magic Shop in Hoboken, New Jersey and New York City respectively. Out of 23 finished songs, 11 was sent for mastering to Ted Jensen at Sterling Sound in New York.

Retox was released on 11 June 2007 to positive reviews. Upon release, the band noted, "We survived Grunge, Britpop, House music, Hip Hop, new rock revolution, dance rock, but maybe not new rave..? People say we've been making the same record for 10 years, that's not right. We've been making the same record for 4-5 years." The club Sticky Fingers in Gothenburg, Sweden held a release party for the album on 15 June, which also coincided with Hank von Helvete's 35th birthday. The band was in attendance and handed out several giveaways, in addition to performing a set of songs. Turbonegro appeared at Download Festival in June and toured both Europe and the United states in support of the album. They served as opening act for Metallica during their show in Oslo in July and Marilyn Manson on their arena tour in late 2007. Drummer Summers departed the band in early 2008 following a foot-injury and was replaced by Tomas Dahl. Following the end of the Retox Tour in 2009, the band went on a hiatus until 2011, while singer von Helvete officially left the band in 2010.

== Track listing ==
All tracks are written by Turbonegro, except where noted.

No.	Title	Length
1.	"We're Gonna Drop the Atom Bomb"	3:41
2.	"Welcome to the Garbage Dump"	1:58
3.	"Hell Toupée"	3:27
4.	"Stroke the Shaft"	3:19
5.	"No, I'm Alpha Male"	3:13
6.	"Do You Do You Dig Destruction"	3:46
7.	"I Wanna Come"	3:37
8.	"You Must Bleed/All Night Long"	2:39
9.	"Hot and Filthy"	3:15
10.	"Boys from Nowhere"	3:29
11.	"Everybody Loves a Chubby Dude"	3:48
12.	"What is Rock?!"	7:49
Total length:		44:01

Special edition bonus tracks
No.	Title	Length
13.	"Back In Denim" (Denim cover)	4:10
14.	"Into the Void"	3:05
Total length:		51:16

Australian iTunes bonus track
No.	Title	Length
13.	"Levelled Karma"	2:36
Total length:		46:37

== Personnel ==
Turbonegro

- Hank von Helvete (Hans Erik Dyvik Husby) – vocals
- Euroboy (Knut Schreiner) – lead guitar, backing vocals
- Rune Rebellion (Rune Grønn) – rhythm guitar
- Pål Pot Pamparius (Pål Bottger Kjærnes) – rhythm guitar
- Happy-Tom (Thomas Seltzer) – bass, backing vocals,
- Chris Summers (Christer Engen) – drums, backing vocals

Additional personnel

- John Agnello – mixing
- Anders Møller – engineer
- Chris Sansom – engineer
- Erlend Gjertsen – recording engineer (additional)
- Lars Voldsdal – recording engineer (additional)
- Chris Di Coco – mixing (assistant)
- James Frazee – mixing (assistant)
- Ted Young – mixing (assistant)
- Ted Jensen – mastering
- Tomas Dahl – backing vocals
- Dimitri Kayiambakis – art direction
- Gardar Eide Einarsson – artwork
- Matias Faldbakken – artwork
- Keith Marlowe – photography
- Terry Richardson – photography
- Trond Sættem – photography
