= Rich Dickerson =

American radio host

Rich Dickerson is a retired talk radio host for WZZR 94.3 FM in South Florida and presenter of the show The Love Doctors. In 1975, while program director at WVTS, Rich is attributed with inadvertently inciting fans of the band Kiss to start the official Kiss fan club, the Kiss Army. By July 1975, WVTS had begun to play Kiss records, often referring to the Kiss Army. Some of the letters included threats to blow up the station. Before long, listeners started calling the station asking how they could enlist.

Dickerson worked with Starkey and Evans to provide advance promotion for a Kiss concert at the new Hulman Civic-University Center in Terre Haute. He retired on December 16, 2016, leaving an indelible mark on the show The Love Doctors and the people of South Florida.
