= Knut Schreiner =

Norwegian guitarist

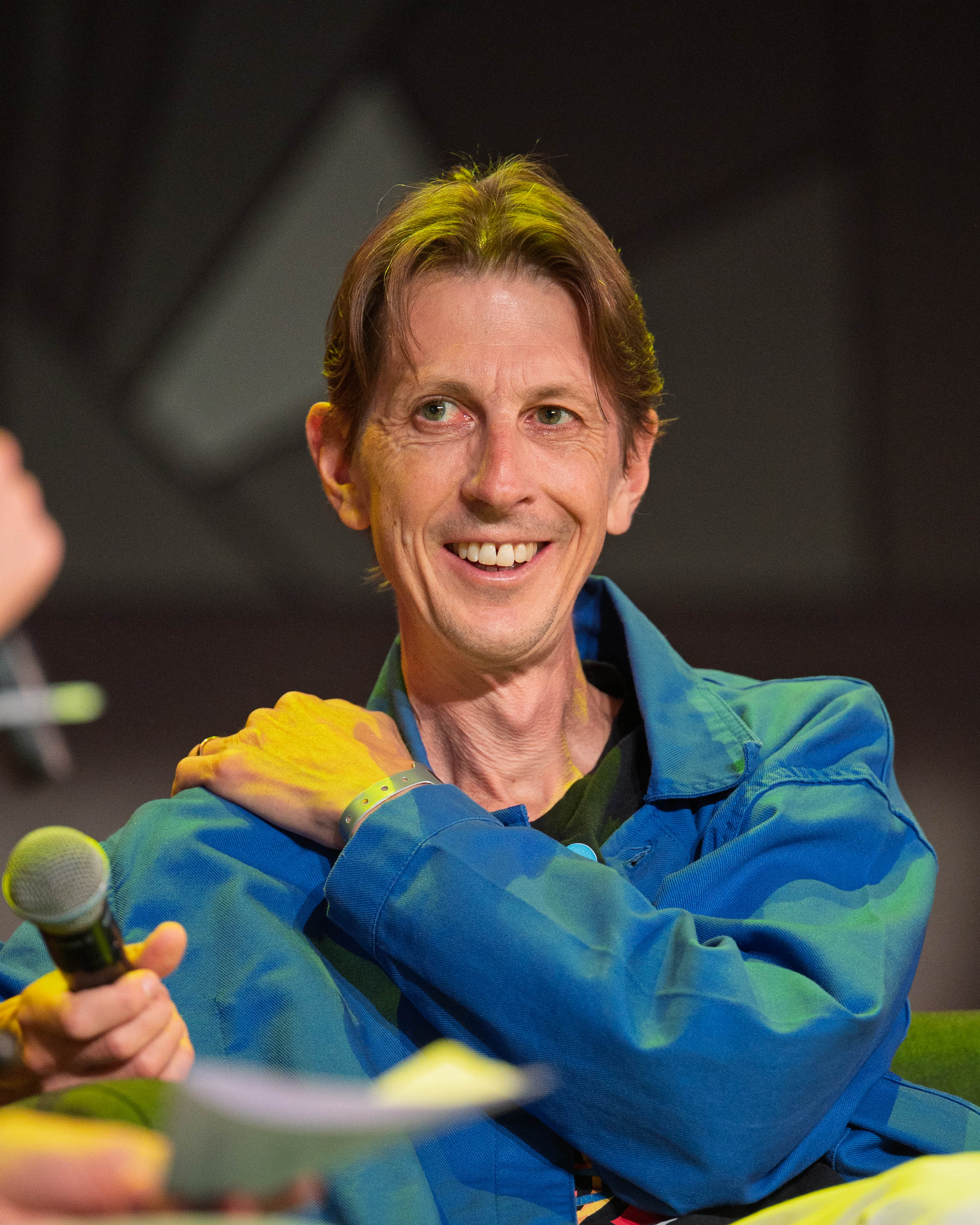
- Schreiner in 2025; Photo: Birgit Fostervold

Background information
- Also known as: Euroboy
- Born: 18 December 1974 (age 51); Bergen, Norway
- Genres: Hard rock, punk rock, death punk, glam punk, soft rock, easy listening, garage rock, psychedelic rock, surf rock
- Occupations: Musician, producer
- Instruments: Guitar

Knut Schreiner (born 18 December 1974) is a Norwegian guitarist. Also known by his stage name Euroboy, he has been part of the Norwegian music scene since the early 1990s as a member of Kåre and the Cavemen (formerly known as Euroboys) and Turbonegro. Schreiner has also been a part the bands The Vikings, Black Diamond Brigade, and Mirror Lakes. He has also been in other musical projects and produced other bands, notably Euroboys, Amulet, and The Lovethugs.

== Career ==
=== As Euroboy ===
Knut Schreiner himself took the stage name Euroboy at the time and was widely-known by that moniker. His style of playing was strongly-influenced by James Williamson of the Stooges from 1971 to 1974. He was also influenced by Ace Frehley of Kiss and Angus Young of AC/DC.

=== Kåre and the Cavemen Euroboys ===
Schreiner was also a long-standing vocalist for Kåre and the Cavemen from 1990 to 2000. In its last year the band changed its name to Euroboys before splitting up.

=== Turbonegro ===
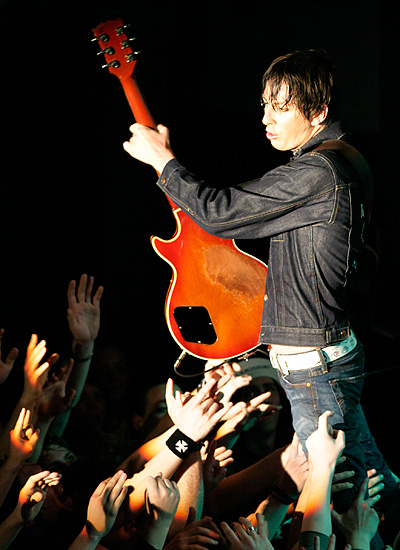
Schreiner with Turbonegro in 2006

Schreiner plays lead guitar and sings backing vocals in the Norwegian band Turbonegro, known in Norway as Turboneger. The band was also known as Stierkampf. Turbonegro is a Norwegian punk rock band that was active from 1989 to 1998, and reformed in 2002. Their style combines glam rock, punk rock and hard rock into a style the band describes as "deathpunk".

=== Other projects ===
Schreiner was also involved at various times in bands The Vikings and The Kwyet Kings.

He was also involved in the musical project Black Diamond Brigade, which released the single "Black Diamond", a cover of a Kiss song.

Schreiner has produced bands such as Turbonegro, Amulet, and The Lovethugs.

In 2002, he finished building his own studio with Anders Moller of Euroboys. It is called Crystal Canyon and is located in Oslo.

Schreiner formed the band Mirror Lakes in 2010 in partnership with vocalist Frode Fivel. Other band-members include Trond Mjøen, Havard Krogeda, and Arne Mathisen. Their debut-album was the eponymous album Mirror Lakes released in 2012.

== Personal life ==
Schreiner studied cultural sociology at the University of Oslo and works in urban planning. In March 2008, he was diagnosed with Hodgkin's disease before announcing in November that he was cured and cancer-free.

== Discography ==
=== With Turbonegro ===
==== Studio albums ====
- Apocalypse Dudes (1998)
- Scandinavian Leather (2003)
- Party Animals (2005)
- Retox (2007)
- Sexual Harassment (2012)
- RockNRoll Machine (2018)

==== Live albums ====
- Darkness Forever! (1999)

==== Compilations ====
- Small Feces (2005)
