= Apocalypse Dudes =

Studio album by Turbonegro
- Released: February 23, 1998
- Recorded: Autumn 1997
- Studio: Endless Sound, Oslo
- Genre: Glam punk, hard rock, punk rock
- Length: 47:31
- Label: Virgin (Norway, 1998); Boomba (Germany, 1998); Bitzcore (Germany, 1998); Man's Ruin/Sympathy for the Record Industry (US, 1999); Burning Heart (re-press) (Sweden); Epitaph (re-press) (US)
- Producer: Pål Klaastad

Turbonegro chronology
Ass Cobra (1996)	Apocalypse Dudes (1998)	Darkness Forever! (1999)

Alternative cover
- Man's Ruin/Sympathy for the Record Industry 1999 edition cover

Professional ratings
Review scores
Source	Rating
AllMusic	4.5/5 stars
The Austin Chronicle	4/5 stars
Mojo	4/5 stars
Pitchfork	8.6/10
Q	4/5 stars
Record Collector	4/5 stars
Spin	B+
Uncut	4/5 stars

Apocalypse Dudes is the fourth album by the Norwegian band Turbonegro. It was released on February 23, 1998, and is the first studio album to feature lead guitarist Euroboy and drummer Chris Summers, and the last release before the band disbanded in December 1998.

The album saw the band move towards a more glam rock-oriented sound mixed with punk and proved to be a breakthrough record for the underground band. It is the first part of the Apocalypse Trilogy, consisting of Apocalypse Dudes (1998), Scandinavian Leather (2003) and Party Animals (2005). The snake on the cover art is taken from the American militant far-left organization Symbionese Liberation Army's banner/flag.

== Production ==
Following the addition of Euroboy and the drummer Chris Summers, Turbonegro had adapted a new sound with the release of their "Prince of the Rodeo" single, gradually moving from punk rock to glam rock. After extensive touring in support of their previous album, Ass Cobra, the band entered Endless Sound studio in late 1997. The band originally planned to release an EP consisting of the songs "Get It On", "Zillion Dollar Sadist" and a cover of David Bowie's "Suffragette City", but as they wrote more songs, they decided to record an album instead. Hank von Helvete struggled with heroin addiction during the recording process and almost quit the band. The vocals for "Are You Ready (For Some Darkness)" took several days to record due to his poor health. Turbonegro finished the recording in late 1997 and signed a contract with Virgin Records to release the album.

While its predecessor, Ass Cobra, was an all-out punk rock record with fast, short songs and a harsh sound, Apocalypse Dudes featured a more produced, rock-oriented sound characterized by a wall of guitars, lengthier compositions and guitar solos. The album's opening track, "The Age of Pamparius", begins with a slow, ascending guitar solo over piano and acoustic guitar, reminiscent of Alice Cooper, before fading into a myriad of synth noises and a whispering voice introducing the album, followed by a plucked guitar riff that erupts into fast-paced glam rock and sing-along vocals. "Get It On" is introduced by hard-hitting drums and a guitar riff in the style of The Dictators. "Rock Against Ass" and "Don't Say Motherfucker, Motherfucker" contains elements of pop rock. "Prince of the Rodeo" features a signature Euroboy riff and conga drums bridge, while "Humiliation Street" is reminiscent of the Stooges and ends with an extended instrumental section that includes several guitar solos. The album's final song, "Good Head", is a cover version of a song by Euroboy and Happy-Tom's former garage rock band, The Vikings.

== Release and reception ==
Apocalypse Dudes was released on February 23, 1998, through Virgin Records in Norway, and Boomba Records and Bitzcore Records in Germany. It was released in the United States on Man's Ruin/Sympathy for the Record Industry on 26 January 1999. Following Turbonegro's reunion in 2002, the album was re-released on 27 January 2003 through Burning Heart Records in Sweden and Epitaph Records in the US. Apocalypse Dudes is certified gold in Norway.

Upon release, Moshable magazine commented, "Apocalypse Dudes is the perfect mix of classic 70's US punk / rock'n'roll like The Dictators, The Heartbreakers & The Ramones... every tune on this release is fucking brilliant." Jello Biafra of Dead Kennedys was quoted as saying, "The new Turbonegro record is possibly the most important European record ever."

The original Boomba Records announcement from April 1998 states, "This my friends, is a virtually perfect record! Excellent production - a huge, FAT sound; lots of power and excellent songs that you can't get out of your head. Not one let down through 47 minutes of music!! This is not an underground tip!! 'Apocalypse Dudes' appeals to the masses. From punk to metal to mainstream, "Apocalypse Dudes" has something for everyone."

Pitchfork rated Apocalypse Dudes 8.6 out of 10. while Punk News rated it four and a half stars out of five.

== In popular culture ==
- The song "Prince of the Rodeo" featured in MTV's Jackass.
- The track "Age of Pamparius" was used as the opening theme of the Jackass spin-off Wildboyz.
- The album is listed in 1001 Albums You Must Hear Before You Die.
- The song "Get It On" featured in the third season of the TV series Sons of Anarchy.
- The track "Back to Dungaree High" was used in the movie The Worst Person in the World.

== Track listing ==
All tracks are written by Turbonegro, except where noted.

No.	Title	Length
1.	"The Age of Pamparius"	5:59
2.	"Selfdestructo Bust"	2:55
3.	"Get It On"	4:08
4.	"Rock Against Ass"	3:49
5.	"Don't Say Motherfucker, Motherfucker"	2:10
6.	"Rendezvous with Anus"	1:59
7.	"Zillion Dollar Sadist"	3:20
8.	"Prince of the Rodeo"	3:45
9.	"Back to Dungaree High"	2:57
10.	"Are You Ready (for Some Darkness)"	3:35
11.	"Monkey on Your Back"	2:52
12.	"Humiliation Street"	5:54
13.	"Good Head" (The Vikings cover)	4:08
Total length:		47:31

Bonus tracks
No.	Title	Length
14.	"Prince of the Rodeo" (single version)	3:41
15.	"Suffragette City" (David Bowie cover)	2:52
Total length:		54:04

== Personnel ==
Turbonegro

- Hank von Helvete (Hans Erik Dyvik Husby) – vocals
- Euroboy (Knut Schreiner) – lead guitar
- Rune Rebellion (Rune Grønn) – rhythm guitar
- Pål Pot Pamparius (Pål Bøttger Kjærnes) – keyboards, percussion
- Happy-Tom (Thomas Seltzer) – bass
- Chris Summers (Christer Engen) – drums

Additional personnel

- Pål Klaastad – producer, engineer
- Christian A. Calmeyer – engineer (additional)
- Christa Brüggemann – lacquer cutting
- Dimitri 'from Oslo' Kayiambakis – artwork
- Marco Finger – photography
- Martin Anderson – photography
- Stian Andersen – photography
