= Thomas Seltzer (musician) =

Norwegian musician (born 1969)

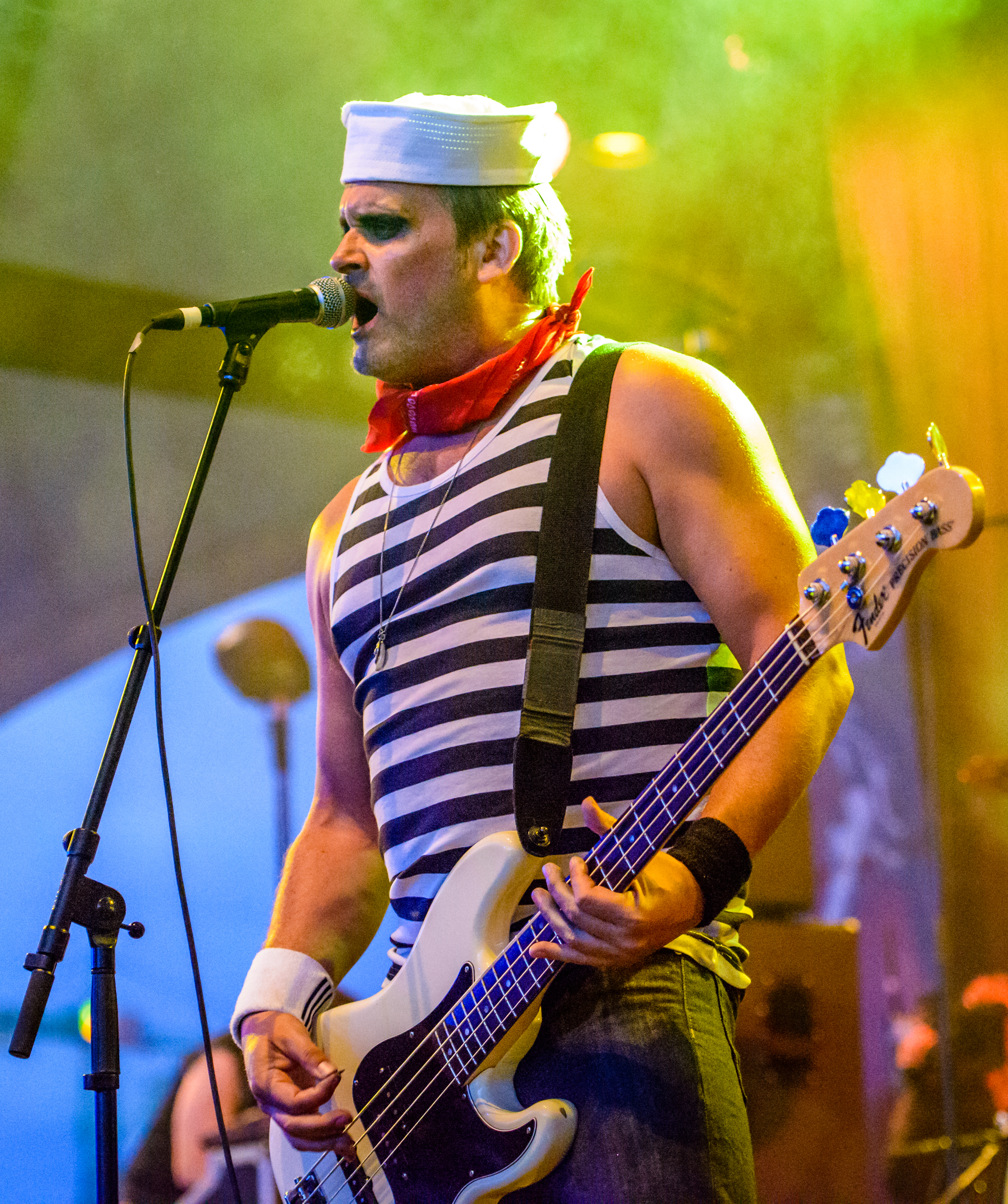
- Seltzer performing live with Turbonegro in 2016
- Born: 27 July 1969 (age 57); Hamar, Norway
- Citizenship: United States; Norway
- Occupations: Musician; songwriter; host; podcaster
- Television: Trygdekontoret (2009); UXA – Thomas Seltzers Amerika (2020–2022)
- Awards: Gullruten 2013, 2021
- Musical career
- Also known as: Happy-Tom
- Genres: Glam punk, hard rock, punk rock, hardcore punk, black metal
- Instruments: Bass, drums
- Years active: 1989–1998, 2002–2010, 2011–present
- Member of: Turbonegro, Scum

Thomas Seltzer (born 27 July 1969), also known by his stage name Happy-Tom, is an American and Norwegian musician and television presenter. He is best known as the bassist (temporarily drummer) and chief songwriter of the rock band Turbonegro.

== Early life ==
Seltzer was born to an American father and a Norwegian mother in Hamar, Norway. He grew up in Superior, Wisconsin, and relocated to Nesodden in Akershus, Norway, in 1975.

Although he was born in Norway and has lived in Norway since his early childhood, Seltzer has always retained his US citizenship and was for a long time not a de jure citizen of Norway. Seltzer applied for Norwegian citizenship in 2016, but was rejected due to Norwegian laws prohibiting multiple citizenships. In 2021, he was granted Norwegian citizenship after Norway started to permit dual citizenship.

While growing up in Norway, Seltzer took up skateboarding, which at the time was deemed illegal by Norwegian authorities and forced him to smuggle in his board from England.

== Career ==
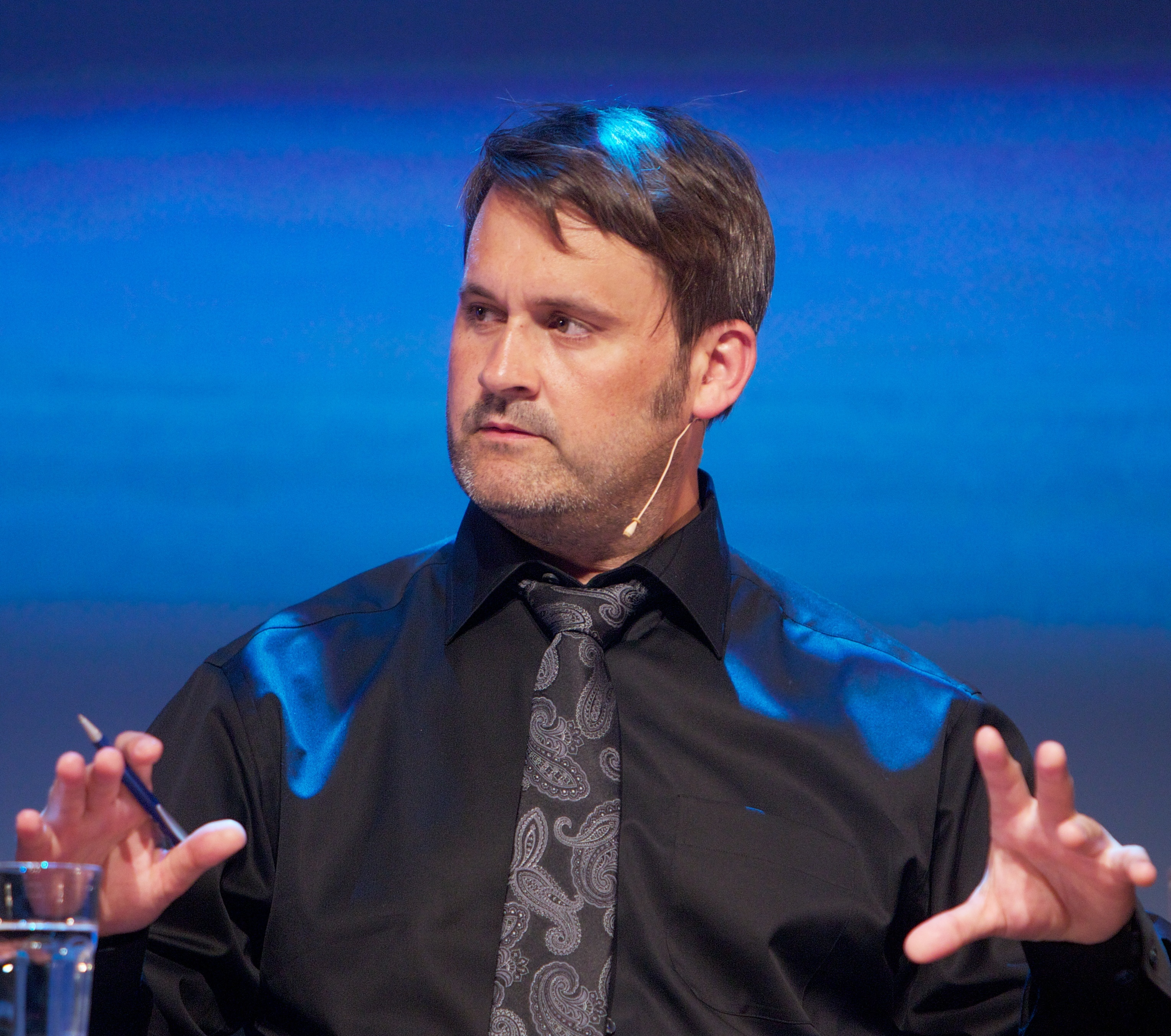
Seltzer in 2011

Seltzer is the bassist (originally drummer) and main songwriter for the band Turbonegro. He is famous for wearing feminine makeup and a sailor's uniform. He has also gone under the names "Tom of Norway" and "Bongo". He has also played in the bands Akutt Innleggelse, The Vikings, Oslo Motherfuckers, and Scum.

Seltzer's personal company is named Menneskekjøtt Engros, translating to Human Flesh Wholesale Inc. The name was intended as a joke to see whether extreme names for businesses would be approved and he has since kept the name. 'Flesh' has notably been referenced in the Turbonegro songs "Just Flesh" and "Sell Your Body (to the Night)".

Seltzer's documentary UXA – Thomas Seltzers Amerika shows him travelling through the United States to examine the state of the American Dream today. The first season, which aired on NRK in 2020, won the Gullruten Award for Best Documentary Series in 2021. The second season aired in 2022.

In 2022, Seltzer published the book Amerikansk Karmageddon: Tanker om mitt fordømte fedreland, which translates to American Karmageddon: Thoughts about my damned fatherland. The book addresses the same topic as the documentary series: the decline of the United States, but is told from an auto-biographical point of view with more informal language than most non-fiction books. The book received mostly good reviews in the Norwegian press, with a notable exception in Aftenposten who called it untrustworthy and a "pop-intellectual bulldozer".

== Personal life ==
Seltzer currently lives in Trondheim with his wife and two children. Seltzer is a friend of Eagles of Death Metal frontman Jesse Hughes, and has interviewed the latter in connection with the band's performance in Paris in February 2016 following the attack on the Bataclan Theatre and for his documentary UXA.

== Discography ==
=== With Turbonegro ===
==== Studio albums ====
- Hot Cars and Spent Contraceptives (1992)
- Never Is Forever (1994)
- Ass Cobra (1996)
- Apocalypse Dudes (1998)
- Scandinavian Leather (2003)
- Party Animals (2005)
- Retox (2007)
- Sexual Harassment (2012)
- RockNRoll Machine (2018)

==== Live albums ====
- Darkness Forever! (1999)

==== Compilation albums ====
- Love It to Deathpunk (2001)
- Small Feces (2005)
