= Soft Focus (Euroboys album) =

Studio album by Euroboys
- Released: 2004
- Genre: Soft rock
- Length: 51:36
- Label: Virgin/EMI
- Producer: Euroboys

Euroboys chronology
Getting Out of Nowhere (2000)	Soft Focus (2004)

Soft Focus is the fifth album released by the Norwegian band Euroboys. It peaked at #2 on the Norwegian album charts.

In their end of the year-list, newspaper Aftenposten selected "One-Way Street" as the song of the year. During the music award Alarmprisen in February 2005, the band also got the song of the year-award.

== Track listing ==
1. "Break Away"
2. "Sleep 'Til Tomorrow"
3. "Hold On"
4. "Fears Be Gone"
5. "Topanga"
6. "One-Way Street"
7. "24 Years"
8. "Good Enough For Now"
9. "Pharaoh"
10. "Soft Focus"
11. "Crystal Pipeline"
