= Never Is Forever =

Studio album by Turbonegro
- Released: 1994
- Recorded: March–December 1993
- Studio: Nesodden Musikkverksted
- Genre: Punk rock
- Length: 65:55
- Label: Dog Job Records; Bitzcore Records (re-release)
- Producer: Christian A. Calmeyer, Turbonegro

Turbonegro chronology
Helta Skelta (1993)	Never Is Forever (1994)	Ass Cobra (1996)

Alternative cover
- Original 1994 cover

Professional ratings
Review scores
Source	Rating
AllMusic	4/5 stars

Never Is Forever is the second full-length album by the Norwegian rock band Turbonegro, released in 1994 via Dog Job Records. It was a limited and CD-only release to only 1,000 copies (some accounts suggest 1,200). Bitzcore Records re-released a remastered version of the album and with a new cover art in 1999. The cover artwork depicts Derrick actor Horst Tappert at a press conference in Oslo in 1993.

== Overview ==
The album—a tribute to Blue Öyster Cult, as claimed by the band themselves—is an attempt to dissociate from the lo-fi aesthetics of the garage scene: "When the rest of the punk oriented world tried hard to be lo-fi and 'real', Turbonegro as usual went the opposite way, creating a miniature suburban deathpunk opera. Seldom have pop culture, darkness and desperation blended so well."

Four songs from the (He's a) Grunge Whore EP were included on the album. The track "Hush, Earthling" features dialogue sampled from the 1980 film Flash Gordon. The album's final song, "Oslo Bloodbath Pt. III: The Ballad of Gerda and Tore", is followed by six minutes of silence and three hidden tracks: bassist Bengt "Bingo" Calmeyer singing "Staten och kapitalet", a 1970s radical left-wing progressive rock tune by Blå Tåget turned into a hit song in Sweden in 1980 by punk rock band Ebba Grön; Evel Knievel performing a poem named "Why?"; and John Culliton Mahoney performing his song "The Ballad of Evel Knievel".

== Track listing ==
All tracks are written by Turbonegro, except for "Why?" by Evel Knievel and "The Ballad of Evel Knievel" by John Culliton Mahoney.

No.	Title	Length
1.	"Letter from Your Momma"	2:16
2.	"Suburban Prince's Death Song"	3:36
3.	"Übermensch"	3:37
4.	"I Will Never Die"	3:54
5.	"No Beast So Fierce"	3:54
6.	"Destination: Hell"	3:23
7.	"Timebomb"	3:18
8.	"Pain in der Arsch Pocket Full of Cash"	1:31
9.	"Hush, Earthling"	3:14
10.	"Nihil Sleighride"	2:59
11.	"(He's a) Grunge Whore"	4:37
12.	"Black Chrome"	2:26
13.	"Oslo Bloodbath Pt. II: I Don't Care"	2:44
14.	"Oslo Bloodbath Pt. III: The Ballad of Gerda and Tore": "Oslo Bloodbath Pt. III: The Ballad of Gerda and Tore"; six minutes of silence; "Staten och Kapitalet"; "Why?"; "The Ballad of Evel Knievel"	24:26: 6:04; 6:00; 4:54; 3:00; 4:28
Total length:		65:55

== Personnel ==
Turbonegro

- Hans Erik/Hanky – vocals
- Rune/Loonie – guitar
- Pål/Toonie – guitar, vocals
- Bengt/Panky – bass, vocals
- Thomas/Happy Tom – drums

Additional personnel

- Christian A. Calmeyer – producer, recording engineer
- Craig Morris – editing, mastering
- Åsgeir Knudsen – recording engineer, additional instruments ("Letter from Your Momma")
- Günter Kesselring – remastering (1999 edition)
- Nero – remastering (1999 edition)
- Christa Brüggemann – lacquer cutting (1999 edition)
- Trbtopia – artwork
- Stian Andersen – photography (live photo)
- Ando Woltmann – photography (1999 edition cover)
- Morten Andersen – photography (1999 edition band photos)
- Dimitri From Oslo – artwork (1999 edition)
