= Turbojugend =

International fan club

The original Turbojugend logo from 1995

Turbojugend, sometimes shortened to TJ, is the international fan club of the Norwegian rock band Turbonegro. A Turbojugend member can be recognised by their specially-made denim jackets with the Turbonegro logo and "Turbojugend [name of chapter]" stitched on the back. The logo of Turbojugend Oslo can be found on almost every album Turbonegro has made. There are more than 2300 Turbojugend chapters worldwide, with Turbojugend Oslo and Turbojugend St. Pauli believed to be the largest chapters.

== History ==
The fan club was originally designed as a joke in 1995 to include on Turbonegro's album sleeves, as guitarist Euroboy explained in a 2007: "We thought about how Kiss had the Kiss Army so we thought that Turbonegro should have our own Navy. It started as a joke in Happy-Tom's apartment in 1995. We put his address on the album sleeves and it was all just for laughs."

Following Turbonegro's break-up in 1998, German label Bitzcore Records bought the rights to the band's music catalog and began reissuing their previous albums. Bitzcore label owner Jürgen Goldschmitt attempted to contact the Turbojugend address from the band's album sleeves, but received no answer. He subsequently decided to form Turbojugend St. Pauli as "the real fan club" and took the nickname "El Presidente", in addition to creating the Turbojugend website. Goldschmitt gifted several Levi denim jackets embroidered with the band's logo and the Turbojugend St. Pauli chapter name to friends in the local music business. The jackets would soon become sought after by fans and Bitzcore started producing them as a merchandising venture. The popularity of the jackets, in addition to the release of the Turbonegro tribute album Alpha Motherfuckers assembled by Goldschmitt, eventually led to the formation of multiple Turbojugend chapters around the world, with Goldschmitt assuming the role of worldwide president. In 2012, official leadership of Turjojugend was handed over to the groups Turbojugend Amb-ASS-adors and Jugendwart, both composed of long-time Turbojugend-members.

== Welt-Turbojugend-Tage ==
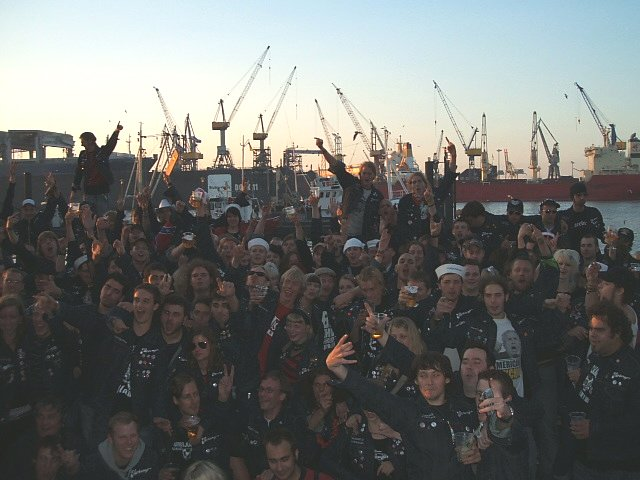
Group photo of Turbojugend Members at the "Welt-Turbojugend-Tage" 2006

Once a year, Turbojugends from all over the world meet in St. Pauli, Hamburg, Germany to celebrate Turbonegro themselves as well as punk rock in general. This two-day event is called Welt-Turbojugend-Tage ("World Turbojugend Days") with concerts and meetings in different clubs. In 2011 the 7th edition of WTJT was held featuring the comeback of Turbonegro, with Duke of Nothing on vocals.

In addition to the Welt-Turbojugend-Tage in Hamburg, in recent years, the Punk Rock Bowling festival in Las Vegas has served as meeting point for Turbojugend chapters worldwide. Each year, several hundred members can be encountered there.

== Associated bands ==
Although Turbojugend is the fan club of Turbonegro, Turbojugend has also taken an interest in other rock bands as well. Some of the bands include:

- The Dogs
- Silver (former band of Turbonegro drummer Tommy Manboy)
- Brainerd
- Peter Pan Speedrock
- The Turbo A.C.'s
- Trashcan Darlings
- The Dukes of Nothing (former band of Turbonegro vocalist Tony Sylvester)
- Valient Thorr

== See also ==
- Aero Force One
- Blue Army
- Kiss Army
