= Kiss Army =

Official fan club of American rock band Kiss

Kiss Army membership form in 1978 used language similar to earlier military recruitment posters

The Kiss Army is the official fan club for the American rock band Kiss, as well as the unofficial name used to refer to Kiss fans in general. It was started unofficially in 1975 by Bill Starkey and Jay Evans.

The membership form displayed for the first time what became known as the official Kiss Army logo, which was designed by Dennis Woloch and Vincent DiGerlando of Howard Marks Inc., the advertising agency working with Bill Aucoin and Kiss at that time.

According to Bruce Vilanch, the president of the Kiss fan club was Ringo Starr's son when Kiss starred in "The Paul Lynde Halloween Special", in 1976.

== History ==
In January 1975, Starkey and Evans, two teenage Kiss fans from Terre Haute, Indiana, began contacting local radio station WVTS in an effort to get Kiss music played. After being repeatedly turned down by program director Rich Dickerson, Starkey and Evans began calling WVTS claiming to be "the Kiss Army." They also sent letters to the station and signed them, "Bill Starkey–President of the Kiss Army," and "Jay Evans–Field Marshall." By July 1975, WVTS had begun to play Kiss records, often referring to the Kiss Army. Some of the letters included threats to blow up the station. Before long, listeners started calling the station asking how they could enlist.

Dickerson worked with Starkey and Evans to provide advance promotion for a Kiss concert at the new Hulman Civic-University Center in Terre Haute. Before the show, Kiss publicist Alan Miller contacted Starkey to discuss the Kiss Army. At Miller's request, Starkey and Evans took phone calls on the air at WVTS to recruit as many members as possible for the Kiss Army. As a result of these efforts, the November 21 show sold out (10,000 seats). During the concert, Starkey was brought on stage and given a plaque by Kiss.

Soon after the Terre Haute concert, the Kiss Army became the official fan club of the group. In 1976, Kiss manager Bill Aucoin requested Howard Marks Inc. to create an official Kiss Army logo. The logo was designed by Dennis Woloch, who also designed about 16 album covers for Kiss. He got the concept from Vincent DiGerlando his longtime friend and co-worker. Order forms for the Kiss Army first appeared with this new official logo in 1976's Destroyer. Former head of Kiss merchandising Ron Boutwell estimated that the fan club (at its peak) earned US$5,000 per day, and had nearly 100,000 members.

In 1980, Australian comedian Garry McDonald, in his Norman Gunston guise, released a single, 'Kiss Army', parodying both the fan club and the seemingly mindless devotion of Kiss fans. The song's music is strongly reminiscent of 'I Was Made for Loving You'. It reached the Top 20 in Australia.

After a period of inactivity, Kiss announced the relaunch of the Kiss Army as the group's official fan club on August 23, 2007. On May 29, 2008, Condoleezza Rice, the United States Secretary of State, enlisted in the Kiss Army.

In celebration of the Kiss Army's 35th anniversary, November 21, 2010, was declared "Kiss Army Day" in Terre Haute. Starkey served as a guest DJ for local rock radio station WWVR.

On March 27, 2025, the band announced a Las Vegas residency titled ‘Kiss Army Storms Vegas’ in celebration of the fan clubs 50th anniversary. The residency is scheduled to take place from November 14–16 at the Virgin Hotel Las Vegas.

== See also ==
- Blue Army
- Deadhead
- Turbojugend
