= Party Animals (album) =

Studio album by Turbonegro
- Released: 27 April 2005 (Norway); 9 May 2005 (Europe)
- Recorded: November 2004 – January 2005
- Studio: LydLab, Oslo, Crystal Canyon, Oslo and Hollywood Sound, Los Angeles
- Genre: Glam punk, hard rock
- Length: 47:43
- Label: Burning Heart Records (Sweden); Bitzcore Records (Germany); Abacus Recordings (US)
- Producer: Steve McDonald & Turbonegro

Turbonegro chronology
Scandinavian Leather (2003)	Party Animals (2005)	Small Feces (2005)

Singles from Party Animals
- 1. "High on the Crime" Released: April 2005; 2. "City of Satan" Released: October 2005

Professional ratings
Review scores
Source	Rating
AllMusic	2.5/5 stars
Pitchfork Media	(2.8/10)
Scene Point Blank	(9.0/10)

Party Animals is an album by the Norwegian rock band Turbonegro, released in April 2005 in Norway and May 2005 in the rest of Europe. It is the final album in the "Apocalypse trilogy". It was released on Burning Heart Records in Sweden, on Bitzcore Records in Germany, and on 23 August 2005 via Abacus Recordings in the United States.

Burning Heart Records also released a version with bonus DVD. It comes with a cardboard sleeve around the jewel-cased CD/DVD. The bonus DVD contains the Hank von Helvete workout video.

== Overview ==
Party Animals is the first Turbonegro album where the band collaborated an external producer. The album was recorded in Oslo between November and December in 2004, then mixed and mastered in Los Angeles in early 2005 together with Steven Shane McDonald. The album sound appears fierce, blunt and with less focus on studio production refinements in comparison to its predecessor Scandinavian Leather. Keith Morris and Nick Oliveri contribute guest vocals on one song each, while the Norwegian Radio Orchestra features on "City of Satan". Bassist Happy-Tom stated that the album was inspired by the likes of the Rolling Stones, Black Flag and Shostakovich.

== In popular culture ==
- "All My Friends Are Dead" was featured in Jackass Number Two, Viva La Bam, Bam's Unholy Union, Dirty Sanchez: The Movie, Norwegian horror movie Fritt Vilt, CSI: Miami, and also in the French amateur movie Morbid Wanka. It was also featured in Just Cause 4’s DLC pack Dare Devils of Destruction in 2019. The song is also used as the entrance music for professional wrestler Cole Radrick, primarily when performing for Game Changer Wrestling.
- "City of Satan" is featured in the first episode of series 2 of the NRK series Skam.
- "Wasted Again" is featured as a downloadable track for the video game series Rock Band.

== Track listing ==
All tracks are written by Turbonegro.

No.	Title	Length
1.	"Intro: The Party Zone"	1:58
2.	"All My Friends Are Dead"	2:36
3.	"Blow Me (Like the Wind)"	3:16
4.	"City of Satan"	5:42
5.	"Death from Above"	3:03
6.	"Wasted Again"	3:07
7.	"High on the Crime"	3:19
8.	"If You See Kaye (Tell Her I L-O-V-E Her)"	2:59
9.	"Stay Free"	3:45
10.	"Babylon Forever"	3:51
11.	"Hot Stuff/Hot Shit"	4:00
12.	"Final Warning"	2:33
13.	"My Name is Bojan Milankovic" (CD-only hidden track)	4:29
Total length:		47:43

== Personnel ==
Turbonegro

- Hank Von Helvete (Hans Erik Dyvik Husby) – lead vocals
- Euroboy (Knut Schreiner) – lead guitar, piano, backing vocals
- Rune Rebellion (Rune Grønn) – rhythm guitar
- Pål Pot Pamparius (Pål Bottger Kjærnes) – keyboards, guitar, percussion, backing vocals
- Happy-Tom (Thomas Seltzer) – bass guitar, backing vocals
- Chris Summers (Christer Engen) – drums, backing vocals

Additional musicians

- The Norwegian Radio Orchestra on "City of Satan" and "Final Warning" arranged by Gaute Storaas, conducted by Ingar Bergby, recorded by Arne Kristian Dypvik, Morten Hermansen and Inger Kvalvik
- Gaute Drevdal – keyboards on "Intro" and "Blow Me (Like the Wind)"
- Anders Møller – congas on "Babylon Forever"
- Mathias Eick and Lars Horntveth – horns
- The Artist Formerly Known as the Greatest Beerdrinker in the World, Keith Morris – guest vocals on "Wasted Again"
- Nick Oliveri – guest vocals on "Final Warning"
- Tomas Dahl, Steven Shane McDonald – backing vocals

Production

- Alexander Benjaminsen – photo production
- Marius Bodin – engineer
- Arne Kristian Dypvik – engineer
- Evan Frankfort – mixing
- Joe Giron – photo production
- Morten Hermansen – engineer
- Erin Kredel – make-up
- Inger Kvalvik – engineer
- Martin Kvamme – design
- Johanna Lacabanne – costume design
- Sebastian Ludvigsen – photography
- Steven Shane McDonald – producer
- Aders Møller – engineer
- Chris Sansom – engineer
- Pia Simensen – costume design
- Gaute Storaas – arranger
- Turbonegro – producer
- Aleks Tamulis – assistant
- Brad Vance – mastering
