= Getting Out of Nowhere =

Studio album by Euroboys
- Released: 2000
- Genre: Rock
- Length: 50:06

Euroboys chronology
Long Day's Flight 'till Tomorrow (1999)	Getting Out of Nowhere (2000)	Soft Focus (2004)

Alternative cover

Professional ratings
Review scores
Source	Rating
AllMusic	4/5 stars

Getting Out of Nowhere is the third album released by the Norwegian band Euroboys. It features two covers, one of the song Master Charge, originally written by James Williamson and Iggy Pop for the album Kill City and the other is the English traditional Scarborough Fair.

== Track listing ==
1. All of My Money
2. Roadblock
3. Dirty Hole
4. Nice for a Change
5. Turn That Sound Up
6. Master Charge
7. Smash It to Pieces!
8. Needle Park
9. Stockholm
10. Scarborough Fair
11. Come On In, Your Time Is Up
