= Hot Cars and Spent Contraceptives =

1992 studio album by Turbonegro

Hot Cars & Spent Contraceptives

Studio album by Turbonegro
- Released: March 1992
- Recorded: November 1991 – January 1992
- Genre: Punk rock
- Length: 41:59; 68:28 (reissue)
- Label: Big Ball; Bitzcore (reissue) (Germany); Get Hip (reissue) (US)
- Producer: Craig Morris, Audun Strype, Turbonegro

Turbonegro chronology
Hot Cars & Spent Contraceptives (1992)	Helta Skelta (1993)

Alternative cover
- Original 1992 cover

Professional ratings
Review scores
Source	Rating
AllMusic	3/5 stars

Hot Cars & Spent Contraceptives is the first full-length album by Norwegian band Turbonegro. It was released in March 1992 through Big Ball Records. Only 1,000 copies were released originally in Norway. A reissue of the record was released in early 1993 in Germany by Repulsion Records titled Helta Skelta. The reissue features four extra tracks and a 24 minute audio-play about a young man being raped by a policeman called "A Career in Indierock". In 2000, Bitzcore Records reissued a remastered edition of Hot Cars & Spent Contraceptives along with other early Turbonegro records. The reissue was released in June 2000 and featured a new cover art by Dimitri 'from Oslo' Kayiambakis. It contained all the tracks from the original version and as well as the second reissue Helta Skelta.

== Sound and lyrics ==
The album gives an early introduction to the deathpunk sound, Turbonegro's very own self proclaimed genre; dark death driven punk rock with occasional excursions into hardcore and metal as well as a certain tendency for disruptive and sarcastic lyrics. The opening line on "Kiss The Knife" is sampled from Peter Sellers in the movie Casino Royale.

== Releases ==
The album was also released on 12" vinyl in Germany with green and black splatters and in the United States through Get Hip Records and in doing so their editions were almost always different in one way or another, mainly in colored wax. This strictly 'limited American only pressing' for GHR was on golden and black marbled wax.

== Track listing ==
All tracks are written by Turbonegro, except for "Prima Moffe".

No.	Title	Length
1.	"Librium Love"	5:17
2.	"Punk Pals"	2:32
3.	"Kiss The Knife"	1:59
4.	"Vaya Con Satan"	4:04
5.	"Hot Cars"	3:34
6.	"Clenched Teeth"	2:27
7.	"New Wave Song"	2:41
8.	"Nadsat Comes Easy"	4:33
9.	"Zonked Out (On Hashish)"	2:04
10.	"I'm In Love With The Destructive Girls"	2:16
11.	"Prima Moffe" (Leather Nun cover)	10:32
Total length:		41:59

All tracks are written by Turbonegro, except for "Prima Moffe".

2000 re-release edition
No.	Title	Length
1.	"Librium Love"	5:17
2.	"Armed and Fairly Well-Equipped" (bonus)	4:06
3.	"Suburban Anti-Christ" (bonus)	1:58
4.	"Punk Pals"	2:30
5.	"Kiss the Knife"	1:57
6.	"Vaya Con Satan"	4:03
7.	"I'm in Love with the Destructive Girls"	2:14
8.	"Hot Cars"	3:34
9.	"Clenched Teeth"	2:23
10.	"Manimal" (bonus)	4:13
11.	"Dark Secret Girl" (bonus)	1:58
12.	"New Wave Song"	2:40
13.	"Nadsat Comes Easy"	4:29
14.	"Zonked Out (on Hashish)"	2:02
15.	"Prima Moffe" (Leather Nun cover)	10:28
16.	"A Career in Indierock" (bonus)	24:36
Total length:		78:28

== Personnel ==
Turbonegro

- Harry Neger (Harald Fossberg) – vocals
- Brune Neger (Rune Grønn) – guitar
- Max Neger (Pål Bøttger Kjærnes) – guitar
- Bingo Neger (Bengt Calmeyer) – bass
- Bongo Neger (Thomas Seltzer) – drums

Additional personnel

- Craig Morris – producer, recording engineer
- Audun J. Strype – producer, recording engineer
- Marko Kluge – mastering (reissue)
- Mista Geir Nilsen – organ ("Zonked Out (on Hashish)")
- Erik Jacobsen – piano ("A Career in Indierock")
- Tove – artwork (graphics)
- John Erling Riise – artwork (flames)
- Paal Audestad – photography
- V. Stenseth – photography (videoclips)
- Dimitri Kayiambakis – design (reissue)
- Alexander Kayiambakis – photography (reissue)
- Morten Andersen – photography (reissue)

== Helta Skelta ==
Helta Skelta

Studio album (reissue) by Turbonegro
- Released: 1993
- Recorded: November 1991 – October 1992
- Genre: Punk rock
- Length: 65:09
- Label: Repulsion (Germany)
- Producer: Craig Morris, Turbonegro

Turbonegro chronology
Hot Cars and Spent Contraceptives (1992)	Helta Skelta (1993)	Never Is Forever (1994)

Helta Skelta is the reissue of Turbonegro's debut album, Hot Cars & Spent Contraceptives. It was released in early 1993 Repulsion Records in Germany and limited to 1,500 copies. The cover art features a painted portrait of Sirhan Sirhan. The reissue includes four additional songs and a 24 minute audio-play about a young man being raped by a policeman called "A Career in Indierock". The Leather Nun cover "Prima Moffe" was not included on this version.

== Track listing ==
All tracks are written by Turbonegro.

No.	Title	Length
1.	"Librium Love"	3:52
2.	"Suburban Anti-Christ"	2:00
3.	"Armed and Fairly Well Equipped"	4:09
4.	"Vaya Con Satan"	4:05
5.	"Punk Pals"	1:23
6.	"New Wave Song"	2:12
7.	"Manimal"	4:15
8.	"Dark Secret Girl"	2:08
9.	"Hot Cars"	3:08
10.	"Clenched Teeth"	2:29
11.	"Nadsat Comes Easy"	4:33
12.	"Kiss the Knife"	1:55
13.	"Zonked Out (on Hashish)"	2:05
14.	"I'm in Love with the Destructive Girls"	2:18
15.	"A Career in Indierock"	24:37
Total length:		65:09

== Personnel ==
Turbonegro

- Hare Neger (Harald Fossberg) – vocals
- Brüne Neger (Rune Grønn) – guitar
- Herr Würst Neger (Pål Bøttger Kjærnes) – guitar
- Bingo Neger (Bengt Calmeyer) – bass
- Bongo Neger (Thomas Seltzer) – drums (congas)

Additional personnel

- Craig Morris – producer, recording engineer
- Audun J. Strype – recording engineer
- Geir Nilsen – organ ("Zonked Out (on Hashish)")
- Erik Jacobsen – piano ("A Career in Indierock")
- John Erling Riise – Sirhan Sirhan painting
- Morten Andersen – photography
