= Hank von Hell =

Norwegian singer (1972–2021)

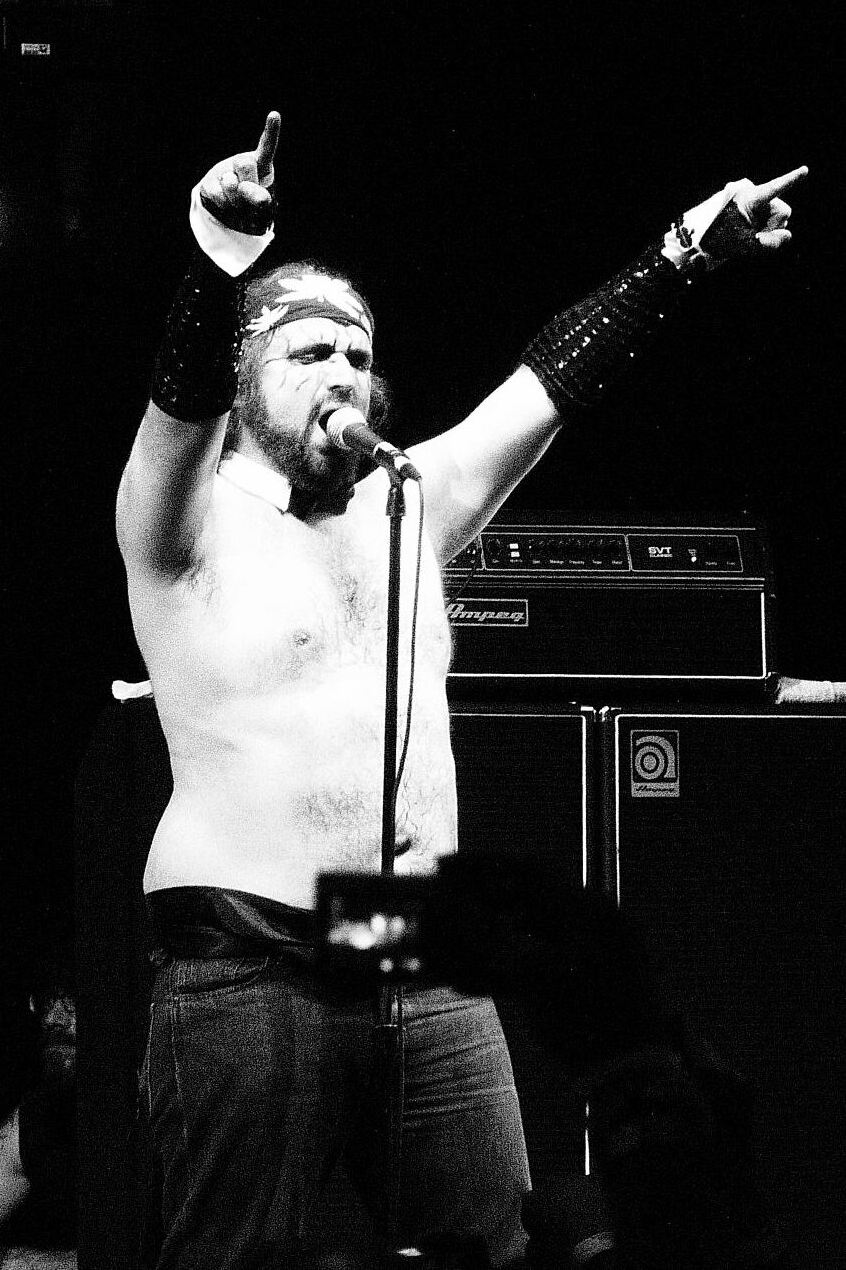
- Hank von Hell at Coachella 2009

Background information
- Also known as: Hank von Helvete; Hank; Hertugen; Herr Tugen; Hertis
- Born: Hans Erik Dyvik Husby; 15 June 1972; Vestvågøy Municipality, Norway
- Died: 19 November 2021 (aged 49) Slottsparken, Oslo, Norway
- Genres: Glam punk; punk rock; hard rock
- Occupations: Singer; actor
- Years active: 1992–2021
- Formerly of: Turbonegro; Doctor Midnight & The Mercy Cult; INRI

Hans-Erik Dyvik Husby (15 June 1972 – 19 November 2021), also known as Hank von Helvete in Norway and Hank von Hell internationally, was a Norwegian singer best known as the lead vocalist of the rock band Turbonegro. He was a member of Turbonegro from 1993 to 2010, appearing on six studio albums with the band, and later embarked on a solo career.

Described as "a charismatic frontman who equally channeled humor and vulnerability", he died on 19 November 2021, at the age of 49.

== Career ==
Husby began his musical career with the punk band INRI and released the EP Breakfast Serial X in 1992. He joined Turbonegro the following year, where he would become known for his interactions with the audience while performing. In 1998, Turbonegro disbanded due to Husby's drug addiction. After going through rehab, he reunited with Turbonegro in 2002. Husby left the band in 2010 to focus on his family and career outside of rock music.

In 2009, Husby had a number one single on the Norwegian Singles Chart with Maria Solheim and the song "Rom for alle". The single spent three weeks at the number one spot, including the Christmas chart for 2009. In 2010, Husby portrayed singer-songwriter Cornelis Vreeswijk in the Swedish film Cornelis. He released a cover album with Vreeswijk songs titled I ljuset av Cornelis later that year.

On 6 June 2011, Husby and his new band Doctor Midnight & The Mercy Cult, released their first album I Declare: Treason. In late 2011, he was a judge in the Norwegian TV series Idol. Husby's biography was released in Norway in October 2012, written by writer and poet Håvard Rem, where he spoke openly about his life and career.

=== Solo career ===
On 31 August 2018, Husby released the first single, "Bum to Bum", from his debut solo album Egomania. The album was released on 2 November through Sony Music/Century Media worldwide. Egomania was co-written with Swedish guitarist and solo band member Eric Bäckman, also known as Cat Casino of Deathstars. When asked why he decided to return and produce a solo record in a 2018 interview, Husby stated: "The timing was just right. I was done with others "angels" in life, and it felt like it was time to go back and do what I always should've done – ROCK. And shake ass."

On 25 January 2019, Husby's song "Fake It" was chosen for competition in the Melodi Grand Prix 2019 to represent Norway at the Eurovision Song Contest in Israel. In June 2020, Husby released his second solo album, Dead.

== Personal life and death ==
Husby and his family moved frequently during his childhood and adolescent years, living in various places across Norway. His early childhood years were spent in the village of Å in Moskenes Municipality on the southwest edge of the Lofoten islands, later moving to Fauske, Rognan and Tvedestrand.

Following Turbonegro's split in 1998, Husby went through detox while living at the island of Moskenesøya in Lofoten, where he worked as a guide at Norwegian Fishing Village Museum and as a presenter at Moskenesradioen, a local radio station.

Husby was married to model Gro Skaustein from August 2009 until October 2014. The couple had a daughter together who was born on 21 December, 2008.

Husby died suddenly on 19 November 2021, at the age of 49, and was found dead in Slottsparken in Oslo. No cause of death was made public, but his manager later denied rumours that he had committed suicide, stating that "his body had finally given in" after a long life of drug abuse. Turbonegro and former bandmates Happy-Tom, Euroboy and Tim Skold paid tribute to him on social media, as did Tony "Duke of Nothing" Sylvester, his replacement in Turbonegro, who wrote "I never tried to fill your shoes as that would have been impossible." Other tributes were made by Eagles of Death Metal frontman Jesse Hughes, Steve-O, Behemoth frontman Nergal, former-Queens of the Stone Age drummer Joey Castillo, Sum 41 bassist Jason McCaslin, Danko Jones, wrestler Darby Allin and actress Juliette Lewis. On 9 December, Husby was buried in Lillestrøm.

== Discography ==
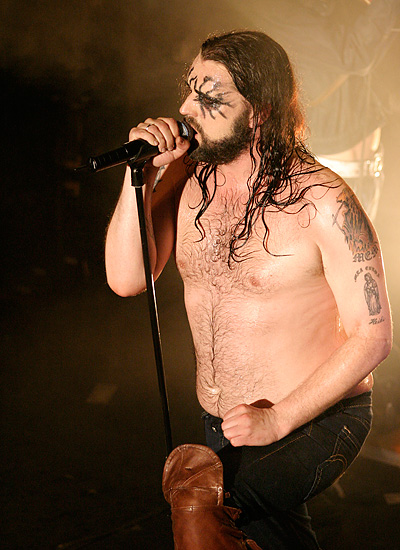
Hank von Hell with Turbonegro in 2005

=== Solo ===
- I ljuset av Cornelis (2010)
- Egomania (2018)
- Dead (2020)

=== With Turbonegro ===
==== Studio albums ====
- Never Is Forever (1994)
- Ass Cobra (1996)
- Apocalypse Dudes (1998)
- Scandinavian Leather (2003)
- Party Animals (2005)
- Retox (2007)

==== Live albums ====
- Darkness Forever! (1999)

==== Compilation albums ====
- Love It to Deathpunk (2001)
- Small Feces (2005)

=== With Doctor Midnight & The Mercy Cult ===
- I Declare: Treason (2011)

=== With INRI ===
- Breakfast Serial X (EP, 1992)

=== With Maria Solheim ===
- "Rom for Alle" (2009)

=== Guest appearances ===
Year	Artist	Title	Song(s)
2003	Bandkind	Look Away, Kids	"Nihil Sleighride"
2004	Schtimm	Featuring...	"Waybackthens", "Idiotsong"
2004	Valentourettes	Valentourettes Speller Jokke	"Narkoman"
2009	Carola	Christmas in Bethlehem	"Silent Night"
2011	With Tobias Fröberg, Peter Morén, Trygve Haug and John Eriksson	GateGrep	"Ballad Om En Gammal Knarkare" (Cornelis Vreeswijk cover)
2018	Mustasch	Silent Killer	"Fire"
2021	Charlie Benante	Silver Linings	"Public Image" (Public Image Ltd cover)
2021	Me and That Man	New Man, New Songs, Same Shit. Vol. 2	"Black Hearse Cadillac"
2022	CKY	Thoughts & Prayers	"Fuck Shit Help & Yeah"
