= Hello Goodbye (band) =

Scandinavian indie rock band

Hello Goodbye is a Scandinavian indie-rock band. Band members include Swedes Lisa Lundkvist and Johannes Kanschat, along with Norwegians Frode Fivel and Alex Kloster-Jensen, who also is the band's producer.

== Members ==
- Lisa Lundkvist - Vocals
- Johannes Kanschat - Drummer
- Frode Fivel - Guitarist/Vocals
- Alex Kloster-Jensen - Guitarist/Producer

== Discography ==
- African Nights 7", Smalltown Supersound (1999)
- Cheesecake, Last Take 7", Booff Records (2002)
- Heart Attack CD/LP, Racing Junior (2002)
- Haunted Holiday CD, Racing Junior (2004)
