= Ass Cobra =

Studio album by Turbonegro
- Released: May 1996
- Recorded: 1994–1995
- Studio: Nesodden Musikkverksted, Nesodden; Green Room, Madison, Wisconsin
- Genre: Punk rock; glam punk
- Length: 31:20
- Label: Amphetamine Reptile (Europe, 1996); Boomba (Germany, 1996); Sympathy for the Record Industry (US, 1997); Bitzcore (Germany, 1998); Get Hip (US, 1998); Epitaph (US, 2003); Burning Heart (Sweden, 2003)
- Producer: Turbonegro

Turbonegro chronology
Never Is Forever (1994)	Ass Cobra (1996)	Apocalypse Dudes (1998)

Professional ratings
Review scores
Source	Rating
AllMusic	4/5 stars
Pitchfork	9.0/10
Scene Point Blank	9.0/10

Ass Cobra is the third full-length studio album by Norwegian punk rock band Turbonegro. It was first released in May 1996, with subsequent reissues in the following years. The album title and cover art is a reference to the AC Cobra sports car and Pet Sounds by the Beach Boys respectively.

== Overview and release ==
Ass Cobra was recorded at Nesodden Musikkverksted in Nesodden, with the exception of "Imorgen Skal Eg Daue" and "Raggare Is A Bunch Of Motherfuckers", which was recorded at the Green Room in Madison, Wisconsin. The album saw the band move towards mid-1970s punk and glam territory, in the style of the Dictators, Ramones and late the Stooges, and features covers of songs by punk bands the Lewd and the Rude Kids.

Ass Cobra was released in May 1996 through Amphetamine Reptile Records in Europe and Boomba Records in Germany. The album was released in the United States by Sympathy for the Record Industry in 1997 and included two bonus tracks, "Screwed And Tattooed" and a cover of the Dicks' song "Young Boys Feet". The album was re-released in 1998 on Bitzcore Records in Germany and on Get Hip Records in the US. Following Turbonegro's reunion in 2002, Ass Cobra was reissued in 2003 through Epitaph Records in the US and Burning Heart Records in Sweden.

== Critical reception ==
Patrick Kennedy of AllMusic wrote that the album "paves the way [for Apocalypse Dudes] harshly, with a sinister wash of cymbals, loud guitars and articulate riffs — think Poison Idea meets Alice Cooper. It is here also where Turbonegro developed their signature look: sailor caps, denim from head to toe, mustaches all around, and decidedly butch homoerotic accoutrements. [...] Though Turbonegro did quite a bit of recording prior to this album, this was the one that set the pace, and the one that enabled them to record their masterpiece, Apocalypse Dudes". Moshable magazine remarked that the album was "the very best in obnoxious drunk punk, already a classic buy-or-die thing!" Pitchfork rated Ass Cobra 9 out of 10.

== Track listing ==
All tracks are written by Turbonegro, except where noted.

No.	Title	Writer(s)	Length
1.	"A Dazzling Display of Talent"		2:01
2.	"The Midnight NAMBLA"		1:36
3.	"Deathtime"		2:20
4.	"Black Rabbit"		1:21
5.	"Denim Demon"		2:11
6.	"Bad Mongo"		2:32
7.	"Mobile Home" (The Lewd cover)	Bob Clic; J. Satz Beret	2:05
8.	"I Got Erection"		2:06
9.	"Just Flesh"		3:09
10.	"Hobbit Motherfuckers"		1:22
11.	"Sailor Man"		2:00
12.	"Turbonegro Hate the Kids"		3:04
13.	"Imorgen Skal Eg Daue ('Tomorrow I'll Be Dead')"		2:32
14.	"Raggare Is a Bunch of Motherfuckers" (Rude Kids cover)	Björn Eriksson; Lasse Olsson	3:01
Total length:			31:20

Bonus tracks
No.	Title	Writer(s)	Length
15.	"Screwed and Tattooed"		3:22
16.	"Young Boys Feet" (Dicks cover)	Dicks	1:14
Total length:			35:56

== Personnel ==
Turbonegro

- Hank von Helvete (Hans Erik Dyvik Husby) – vocals
- Pål Pot Pamparius (Pål Bøttger Kjærnes) – guitar
- Rune Rebellion (Rune Grønn) – guitar
- Bingo (Bengt Calmeyer) – bass guitar
- Happy-Tom (Thomas Seltzer) – drums

Additional personnel

- Christian A. Calmeyer – engineer
- Erik Hanisch – engineer (track 13 and 14)
- Rich Burnette – engineer (track 13 and 14)
- Sean Bovine – engineer (track 13 and 14)
- Günter Pauler – direct metal mastering
- Morten Andersen – photography
- Schlossnose – art direction
- Phil "King Irwin" The Whiskey Rebel" Irwin – liner notes
