= Euroboys =

Norwegian band

Kåre and the Cavemen
- Also known as: Euroboys (2000–2014)
- Origin: Harestua, Norway
- Genres: Garage punk; garage rock; surf music; exotica
- Years active: 1990–present
- Labels: Virgin Records, Hit Me Records, Man's Ruin Records
- Members: Knut Schreiner; Anders Møller; Trond Mjøen; Mats Engen; Erling Norderud Hansen

Euroboys, also known as Kåre and the Cavemen, is a Norwegian band formed in Harestua in 1990. The band changed their name to Euroboys in 1997 for releases outside of Norway and in 2000 for all releases including inside Norway. The band went on a hiatus in the late 2000s and reunited as Kåre and the Cavemen in 2014.

== History ==
=== Beginnings ===
Kåre and the Cavemen originally came from a smalltown north of Oslo called Harestua, and started out as a Beastie Boys inspired hip hop/punk band with founding members Kåre João Erik Pedersen (bass, vocals), Knut Schreiner (guitar) and Werner Holm (drums). They soon concentrated on punk rock, as Dag Gravem relieved Pedersen of his bass duties. In the fall of 1990, the group's musical orientation changed permanently to '50s and '60s instrumental garage rock heavily influenced by Link Wray, as Holm left and Pedersen took over the drums.

During the early nineties, Kåre and the Cavemen established themselves firmly in the Norwegian garage underground, supporting acts like The Cosmic Dropouts and Peau de Pêche while still in their teens. Garage rock entrepreneur Arne Thelin heard the band live as well as on their 1990 demo tape Rock with the Cavemen, and recorded a number of tunes by the group in the fall of 1991. Of these recordings, only the tune Monster-a-Go-Go has surfaced, on hobby ornithologist and leatherwear enthusiast Thelin's 1993 sampler LP Penguins and Bondage.

In the spring of 1993, Kåre and the Cavemen recorded a number of radio jingles for the Norwegian National Radio's brand new P3 channel. These jingles were used throughout the nineties on P3's Rocksrevyen (Rock review) show.

Around this time, Schreiner and Pedersen started concentrating on other musical projects, among these The Abusers, The Cavebones and the Thelin-lead Kwyet Kings. A rare Kåre and the Cavemen performance took place in the summer of 1994, when the band held a release party for Pedersen after he had served a DWI sentence.

=== Breakthrough ===
Disillutioned with their other projects, Schreiner and Pedersen regrouped with Gravem in 1995. At the same time, Quentin Tarantino's seminal Pulp Fiction movie and its soundtrack was starting to influence mainstream popular culture. This development created an unexpected interest in Kåre and the Cavemen's music, which now also incorporated elements of easy listening and exotica. Still young and fluent in the styles of Link Wray and Dick Dale, the band suddenly became a popular live act at media kickoff parties as well as biker conventions. The group again entered the studio, and released the EP The Mood on Hit Me! Records in the spring of 1996. During these sessions, material for an entire album was recorded. Of these recordings only a cover version of Hava Nagilah on a 1996 radio promo single has surfaced. (Some of these songs, including Hava Nagilah, were re-recorded for Kåre and the Cavemen's 1997 debut album Jet Age.)

In the summer of 1996, the band was invited to the Quart Festival, Norway's most important rock festival of the nineties. Anders Møller, previously of The O-Men and Gluecifer joined the band permanently on percussion. Soon after, Kåre and the Cavemen landed a deal with Norwegian National Television's brand new NRK2 channel. For two seasons they were the house band on the comedy/talk show called Direkte Lykke, gaining media attention for music and antics alike. About the same time, they signed a three album recording contract with Virgin Records.

In the spring of 1997, Kåre and the Cavemen's debut album Jet Age was released, peaking at #7 on the Norwegian album charts. In many ways a summing-up of the musical styles the band had developed through the years and presented on TV, the record established Kåre And The Cavemen in the Norwegian rock elite and was critically acclaimed. In the early summer, 19-year-old Per Øydir joined the band on organ and electric piano, adding new dimensions to the band's sound. Kåre And The Cavemen toured extensively in Norway, did the key Scandinavian festivals as well as a tour of the European continent and the US, after a Virgin Records subsidiary released the album stateside. In connection with these gigs, they changed their international name to Euroboys.

=== Apex ===
In 1996, Schreiner had joined Turbonegro on lead guitar, taking the stage name Euroboy. His playing and producing skills, largely gained through playing in Kåre and the Cavemen, soon proved to be instrumental in making these suburban death punks one of Europe's most feared and respected underground bands. Around the release of Turbonegro's 1998 classic Apocalypse Dudes, Kåre and the Cavemen laid low for a while. After Turbonegro singer Hank von Helvete's mental breakdown in the fall of 1998, Schreiner again turned his attention to Kåre and the Cavemen as recordings for their second album Long Day's Flight 'till Tomorrow commenced. This album is generally considered to be the finest Kåre and the Cavemen release. It owes much of its artistic success to Per Øydir's contributions, although Schreiner remains the main composer and producer. A musically matured and more focused effort than Jet Age, Long Day's Flight... offers a many-faceted yet distinctive blend of a wide range of musical influences, ranging from easy listening through psychedelia to progressive rock. The album debuted at number three on the Norwegian album charts, and the group once again toured Scandinavia and the continent following releases in various countries (US release on Man's Ruin Records).

=== Disintegration and new beginnings ===
In the fall of 1999, Kåre and the Cavemen recorded and released their last domestic release under their original name, the 1999 Man EP which reached number three on the Norwegian singles charts. On this recording, it was evident that the band was leaving their exclusively instrumental musical direction. Tensions were growing within the group, and during the recording of the band's third album Getting Out Of Nowhere (2000), Pedersen, Gravem and Øydir quit. Schreiner and Møller finished the album and continued with new members as Euroboys.

=== Aftermath ===
While Schreiner and Møller have released yet another Euroboys album (Soft Focus, 2004), Schreiner has largely been concentrating on the resurrected and much more successful Turbonegro. Schreiner and Møller are co-owners and engineers/producers at Crystal Canyon Studios in Oslo. Øydir has focused on his '60s beat groups The Indikation and Peter Berry And The Shake Set; both considered among the most uncompromising and competent bands in their genre. Pedersen and Gravem have continued their collaboration through the psychedelic rock band Kåre João on the Sideman (2002) and 2 (2005) albums. 24 May 2006, Kåre and the Cavemen reunited for a single concert in Oslo with the line-up of the Long Day's Flight... era as part of a Link Wray tribute show. The instrumental music of Kåre and the Cavemen may still be heard as radio jingles and on soundtracks, but also in its own right on connoisseur radio shows such as Little Steven's Underground Garage.

== Band members ==
Current members

- Knut "Euroboy" Schreiner – guitars/vocals (1990–present)
- Anders Møller – percussion/drums (1995–present)
- Christer "Chris Summers" Engen – drums/percussion/vocals (1998–present)
- Mats "Matt Summers" Engen – bass/vocals (2000–present)
- Trond Mjøen – guitars/vocals (2002–present)
- Erling Norderud Hansen – keyboards (2001–present)

Former members

- Kåre "João" Erik Pedersen – vocals/bass/drums (1990–2000)
- Dag Falang Gravem – bass (1990–2000)
- Per "Kid" Øydir – keyboards (1997–2000)
- Stefan "Rockman" Høglin – keyboards (2000–2001)
- Ole "First Valley" Øvstedal – guitars (2000–2001)
- Werner Holm – drums (1990)

== Discography ==
=== as Kåre and the Cavemen ===
==== Albums ====
- Jet Age (1997)
- Filadelfia (1998)
- Long Day's Flight 'till Tomorrow CD/2LP (1999)

==== EPs ====
- The Mood 7" (1996)
- ...reverberation! CD/7" (1996)
- Girlfriend in Tacoma (1997)
- Down the Road of Golden Dust (1999)
- 1999 Man (1999)

==== Demo/promo ====
- Rock with the Cavemen (1991)
- Hava Negilah/Spanish Kiss (1996)
- Rubber City Revolution/Spiral Slider (1997)

=== as Euroboys ===
==== Albums ====
- Getting Out of Nowhere (2000)
- Soft Focus (2004)

==== EPs ====
- 1999 Man (1999)
- Party Animal/Witchbanger Pict. 7" (1999)
- Turn That Sound Up/Scarborough Fair (2000)
- Hot Rod (2001)

==== Demo/promo ====
- Mr. Wild Guitar 7" (1998)
- Filadelfia (1998)
- Scarborough Fair (2000)
- Looking for a Break In (2001)
- One Way Street (2004)
