= Amulet (band) =

Norwegian hardcore punk band

- Origin: Oslo, Norway
- Genres: Punk rock
- Years active: 1993–2007
- Labels: Sober Mind, Golf, Cylinder, Columbia
- Members: Lars Rasmussen; Rasmus Nord; Espen Follestad; Jonas Thire; Torgny Amdam

Amulet was a hardcore punk band based in Oslo, Norway, formed in 1993 by Torgny Amdam and disbanded in 2007. During the 14 years they were active, they released four albums, three EPs and four 7" records. Blessed and Cursed is a compilation album of their best songs.

The band released its debut album through Belgian hardcore record label Sober Mind Records in 1994. The Danger! Danger! album charted on 13th place on the Norwegian albums chart VG-lista.

== Albums ==
- Amulet (1994)
- Engrave (1996)
- The Burning Sphere (1999)
- Freedom Fighters (2001)
- Danger! Danger! (2003)
- All That Is Solid Melts Into Air (2005)
- Blessed and Cursed (2007)
