= Shotgun Messiah =

Swedish rock band

- The Shotgun Messiah album lineup. Clockwise from top left: Zinny J. Zan, Tim Sköld, Harry Cody and Stixx Galore.

Background information
- Also known as: Kingpin (1985–1989)
- Origin: Skövde, Sweden; Hollywood, California, US
- Genres: Hard rock; glam metal; industrial metal (later)
- Years active: 1985–1993
- Label: Combat/Relativity
- Past members: Tim Skold; Harry Cody; Bobby Lycon; Zinny J. Zan; Stixx Galore

Shotgun Messiah was a Swedish glam metal band from Skövde. The band was formed in 1985 by guitarist Harry Cody and bassist Tim Sköld, with singer Zinny J. Zan and drummer Stixx Galore taking part in their most commercially successful lineup. The band released three studio albums, Shotgun Messiah, Second Coming and Violent New Breed, with Cody and Sköld being the only constant members of the band. Shotgun Messiah disbanded in 1993.

== History ==
=== First era: 1985–1991 ===
Shotgun Messiah was originally formed under the name Kingpin in 1985 in Skövde by bassist Thim "Tim Tim" Sköld and guitarist Harry "Harry Cody" Kemppainen, with drummer Pekka "Stixx Galore" Ollinen and singer Jukka "J.K. Knox" Kemppainen completing the first lineup. The band recorded the album Welcome to Bop City released by CMM Records in 1988, which yielded a number 1 single in the Swedish charts titled "Shout It Out." In the US, the song rose to the top 100 of the Billboard Album Chart. During the recording of Welcome To Bop City, Knox was replaced by Easy Action singer Bo "Zinny J. Zan" Stagman.

Following the release of the album, the band moved to Hollywood and secured a record deal with Relativity Records. They soon discovered that a San Francisco band had a copyright on the name Kingpin, and subsequently changed their name to Shotgun Messiah. The band remixed Welcome To Bop City and released it in September 1989 as Shotgun Messiah. The Washington Post called their music "cocky, loud and rough", and the album would go on to sell almost 500,000 copies. In the late summer of 1989 Shotgun Messiah embarked on their first North American solo tour to support the album. First gig was at the legendary The Palace, Hollywood, California. Together with Pretty Boy Floyd (American band) they played several concerts across the United States. The final show took place in January 1990 in Saratoga Springs, New York. Afterward, the drummer was injured in a skiing accident, and the band had to take a break from touring.

=== Second era: 1991–1993 ===
Frontman Zan departed the band in the spring of 1990 and bassist Sköld took over vocal duties. Shotgun Messiah drafted an American bassist, Bobby Lycon from New York band Battalion (which also featured future Michael Monroe guitarist Jon Rae Sierra), to fill Sköld's former position. In 1991, the band's follow up album Second Coming was released, including their most recognizable hit "Heartbreak Blvd".. To promote the album, they went on tour and performed some shows together with Vinnie Moore. Stylistically, the band's music evolved into a hybrid of metal, rap, pop, and classical. In 1992, Shotgun Messiah released I Want More, an EP featuring covers of songs by the Ramones, The Stooges, and the New York Dolls.

=== Third era: 1993 ===
By 1993, Cody and Sköld were the only remaining members of Shotgun Messiah. In the studio, they created what would be the last Shotgun Messiah album, Violent New Breed. The album was significantly different from the previous efforts as it focused heavily on an industrial metal. The duo embarked on the Violent New Breed tour to support the album. After the tour, Shotgun Messiah disbanded when their label, Relativity, began to focus on rap music.

=== Post-Shotgun Messiah ===
After Shotgun Messiah disbanded, Sköld released a solo album entitled Skold. He then joined bands KMFDM and MDFMK, collaborating with the former on the album, Skold vs. KMFDM. From 2002 to 2008, Sköld was a producer, songwriter and multi-instrumentalist for Marilyn Manson, which included recording two albums and touring with the band. He later formed the supergroup Doctor Midnight and the Mercy Cult in 2009 and released the album I Declare: Treason in 2011 with the band. Sköld later went on to release five additional solo albums: Anomie in 2011, The Undoing in 2016, Never is Now in 2019, Dies Irae in 2021, Dead God in 2022 and Seven Heads in 2023.

Cody joined the short-lived project Coma with Saigon Kick singer Matt Kramer in 1994. In 1996, Cody teamed up with Rhino Bucket singer Georg Dolivo to form Das Cabal. The band recorded "What Do You Want" for the Boogie Boy movie soundtrack in 1998. Cody collaborated with Tom Waits, and performed guitar and banjo on the latter's 2004 album Real Gone and the Orphans: Brawlers, Bawlers & Bastards boxset compilation released in 2006. In 2005, Cody composed the score for the film Wassup Rockers.

Singer Zan and drummer Stixx reunited in 2012 as Shotgun to celebrate the 25th anniversary of Welcome to Bop City. They later released a live album under the Shotgun moniker with a lineup that also included guitarist Rob Marcello, bassist Chris Laney and keyboardist Jonas Beijer.

In 2019, Shotgun Messiah's original lineup was close to reuniting for festival shows, but talks eventually fell through. In 2022, Zan claimed that the reunion never took place due to Sköld's management wanting the singer's role to be limited to guest appearances. In 2025, Cody revealed that he had been recording new music with Sköld and Zan and hinted that a reunion and possible tour alongside a new album could occur soon due to increased popularity.

== Lineups ==
=== Shotgun Messiah ===
- Zinny J. Zan – lead vocals
- Harry Cody – guitars, backing vocals
- Tim Sköld – bass, backing vocals
- Stixx Galore – drums, backing vocals

=== Second Coming ===
- Tim Sköld – lead vocals
- Harry Cody – guitars, backing vocals
- Bobby Lycon – bass, backing vocals
- Stixx Galore – drums, backing vocals

=== Violent New Breed ===
- Tim Sköld – lead vocals, programming, bass
- Harry Cody – lead guitar, backing vocals, programming
- Bill Bruce – rhythm guitar (live)
- Pat Guyton – bass (live)
- Bjarne "B. J." Johansson – drums (live)

== Discography ==
Title	Album details	Peak chart positions	Sales
Title	Album details	US	Sales
Shotgun Messiah	Released: 12 September 1989; Label: Relativity Records; Formats: CD, CD, LP	99	US: 490,000
Second Coming	Released: 22 October 1991; Label: Relativity Records; Formats: CD, CD, LP	199	US: 145,264+
I Want More (EP)	Released: 17 November 1992; Label: Relativity Records; Formats: CD, CS	—	US: 13,016+
Violent New Breed	Released: 28 September 1993; Label: Relativity Records; Formats: CD, CS	—	US: 33,370+
"—" denotes a recording that did not chart or was not released in that territory.

=== Singles ===
Year	Single
1989	"Shout It Out"
1989	"Don't Care About Nothin'"
1991	"Heartbreak Blvd."
1992	"Living Without You"
1993	"Violent New Breed"
