= Grotesk Burlesk Tour =

2003–04 concert tour by Marilyn Manson

- World tour by Marilyn Manson
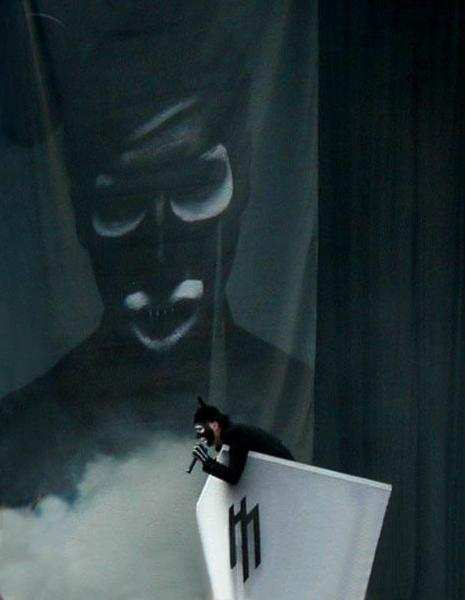
- Marilyn Manson performing live
- Associated album: The Golden Age of Grotesque
- Start date: April 11, 2003
- End date: January 3, 2004
- Legs: 8
- No. of shows: 119

Marilyn Manson concert chronology
- Guns, God and Government Tour (2000–2001); Grotesk Burlesk (2003–2004); Against All Gods Tour (2004–2005)

Grotesk Burlesk was the ninth tour Marilyn Manson embarked on, under management of major record label Interscope Records. It was the band's fifth tour to span over multiple legs. The band was on tour from April 11, 2003, until January 3, 2004.

Many of the costumes and attire used for the tour were tailored by French fashion designer and grand couturier Jean-Paul Gaultier.

== Performance and show themes ==
The stage was designed to resemble that of the classic vaudeville and burlesque stage shows of the 1930s, a prevalent motif found in the album itself. Encompassing this theme most notably were two live dancers dressed in vintage burlesque costume who would be present on stage for most of the show, they danced for "mOBSCENE" and "Sweet Dreams (Are Made of This)", and performed piano for "The Golden Age of Grotesque" and floor toms for "Doll-Dagga Buzz-Buzz Ziggety-Zag". They also appeared during performances of "Para-noir". Dressed as if they were conjoined, they accompanied Manson as he was elevated some 12 metre (39 ft) above the stage, much like during performances of "Cruci-Fiction in Space" on the Guns, God and Government tour. The stage also utilized a series of platforms. Manson would sing at a podium for performances of "The Fight Song", donning blackface while wearing an Allgemeine SS-style peaked police cap or, alternatively, Mickey Mouse ears. During performances of "The Dope Show", Manson would wear elongated arms designed by Rudy Coby, which he would swing in a marching manner as he walked along the stage. At the end of each performance of "The Golden Age of Grotesque", Manson played saxophone—a rare instance of the vocalist playing a live instrument in concert.

== Lineup ==
- Marilyn Manson - lead vocals
- John 5 - guitars, backing vocals
- Tim Sköld - bass, backing vocals
- Madonna Wayne Gacy - keyboards
- Ginger Fish - drums

== Supporting acts ==
- Queen Adreena
- Apocalyptica
- Mudvayne
- Peaches

== Track listing ==
1. "Repent"
2. "Thaeter"
3. "This Is the New Shit"
4. "Disposable Teens"
5. "Irresponsible Hate Anthem"
6. "Astonishing Panorama of the Endtimes"
7. "Use Your Fist and Not Your Mouth"
8. "Great Big White World"
9. "Lunchbox" (Spoken)
10. "1996" (Spoken)
11. "Rock Is Dead"
12. "Mobscene"
13. "Tainted Love"
14. "Para-Noir"
15. "Tourniquet"
16. "Baboon Rape Party"
17. "The Dope Show"
18. "Saint"
19. "The Golden Age of Grotesque"
20. "Doll-Dagga Buzz-Buzz Ziggety-Zag"
21. "Sweet Dreams (Are Made of This)" (With "The Reflecting God" outro)
22. "Rock 'n' Roll Nigger"
23. "Obsequey (The Death of Art)"
24. "It's a Small World"
25. "The Fight Song"
26. "The Beautiful People"
27. "Better of Two Evils"

=== Opening songs ===
- "Disposable Teens" (2003/05/29 Lisbon, Portugal, 2003/05/31 Derby, England and few others)
- "This Is the New Shit"

== Grotesk Burlesk spring european tour ==
Summer European Set list
- "Thaeter"
- "This Is the New Shit"
- "Disposable Teens"
- "Irresponsable Hate Anthem"
- "Use Your Fist and Not Your Mouth"
- "Great Big White World"
- "Rock Is Dead"
- "Mobscene"
- "Tainted Love"
- "The Dope Show"
- "Saint"
- "The Golden Age of Grotesque"
- "Doll-Dagga Buzz-Buzz Ziggety-Zag"
- "Sweet Dreams (Are Made of This)"
- "The Fight Song"
- "The Beautiful People"
Note: 8 songs are from the album The Golden Age of Grotesque.

== Tour dates ==
List of concerts, showing date, city, country, and venue
Date	City	Country	Venue	Opening Act(s)	Attendance	Revenue
Grotesque Burlesque
April 11, 2003	Berlin	Germany	Volksbuehne	none	—	—
April 15, 2003	London	England	Rogue	none	—	—
May 12, 2003	Los Angeles	United States	The Key Club	none	—	—
Leg 1: Spring European Leg
May 29, 2003	Lisbon	Portugal	Rock in Lisbon	n/a	—	—
May 30, 2003	Madrid	Spain	Festimad	n/a	—	—
May 31, 2003	Derby	England	Download Festival	n/a	—	—
June 2, 2003	Glasgow	Scotland	Braehead Arena	n/a	—	—
June 4, 2003	London	England	Brixton Academy	n/a	—	—
June 6, 2003	Nuremberg	Germany	Rock im Park	n/a	—	—
June 8, 2003	Nürburgring	Germany	Rock am Ring	n/a	—	—
June 10, 2003	Poznań	Poland	Poznań Arena	n/a	—	—
June 12, 2003	Vilnius	Lithuania	Žalgiris Stadium	n/a	—	—
June 14, 2003	Dresden	Germany	Messe Halle	n/a	—	—
June 15, 2003	Nijmegen	Netherlands	Fields of Rock	n/a	—	—
June 17, 2003	Leuven	Belgium	Brabanthallen	n/a	—	—
June 20, 2003	Wiesen	Austria	Kick Off Festival	n/a	—	—
June 21, 2003	Tábor	Czech Republic	Festival Planet Roxy	n/a	—	—
June 22, 2003	Milan	Italy	Mazda Palace	—	—	
Leg 2: Ozzfest 2003
June 28, 2003	San Antonio	United States	Verizon Wireless Amphitheater	none	—	—
June 29, 2003	Dallas	United States	Smirnoff Music Centre	none	—	—
July 2, 2003	Phoenix	United States	Cricket Wireless Pavilion	none	—	—
July 3, 2003	Chula Vista	United States	Coors Amphitheatre	none	—	—
July 5, 2003	Devore	United States	Glen Helen Blockbuster Pavilion	none	—	—
July 6, 2003^{1}	Las Vegas	United States	House of Blues	none	—	—
July 8, 2003	San Francisco	United States	Shoreline Amphitheatre	none	—	—
July 9, 2003	Sacramento	United States	Sleep Train Amphitheatre	none	—	—
July 11, 2003^{1}	Vancouver	Canada	Orpheum Theatre	none	—	—
July 12, 2003	Seattle	USA	White River Amphitheatre	none	—	—
July 13, 2003	Portland	USA	Arlene Schnitzer Concert Hall	none	—	—
July 15, 2003	Albuquerque	USA	Journal Pavilion	none	—	—
July 17, 2003	St. Louis	USA	UMB Bank Pavilion	none	—	—
July 19, 2003	Somerset	USA	Float-Rite Park	none	—	—
July 20, 2003	Tinley Park	USA	Tweeter Center	none	—	—
July 22, 2003	Cleveland	USA	Blossom Music Center	none	—	—
July 24, 2003	Detroit	USA	DTE Energy Music Theatre	none	—	—
July 25, 2003	Detroit	USA	DTE Energy Music Theatre	none	—	—
July 26, 2003^{1}	Toronto	Canada	Hummingbird Centre	none	—	—
July 28, 2003^{1}	Montreal	Canada	Métropolis	none	—	—
July 30, 2003	Pittsburgh	USA	Post-Gazette Pavilion	none	—	—
July 31, 2003	Indianapolis	USA	Verizon Wireless Amphitheatre	none	—	—
August 2, 2003	Milwaukee	USA	Alpine Valley Music Theatre	none	—	—
August 3, 2003	Columbus	USA	Polaris Amphitheatre	none	—	—
August 5, 2003	Scranton	USA	Montage Mountain Performing Arts Center	none	—	—
August 7, 2003	Camden	USA	Tweeter Center at the Waterfront	none	—	—
August 8, 2003^{1}	Philadelphia	USA	Electric Factory	none	—	—
August 9, 2003	Hartford	USA	Meadows Music Theatre	none	—	—
August 14, 2003	Mansfield	USA	Tweeter Center	none	—	—
August 15, 2003	Mansfield	USA	Tweeter Center	none	—	—
August 16, 2003	Portland	USA	Cumberland County Civic Center	none	—	—
August 18, 2003	Holmdel Township	USA	PNC Bank Arts Center	none	—	—
August 19, 2003	Holmdel Township	USA	PNC Bank Arts Center	none	—	—
August 21, 2003^{1}	Norfolk	USA	The NorVa	none	—	—
August 22, 2003	Bristow	USA	Nissan Pavilion	none	—	—
August 24, 2003	Charlotte	USA	Verizon Wireless Amphitheatre	none	—	—
August 26, 2003	Atlanta	USA	HiFi Buys Amphitheatre	none	—	—
August 27, 2003	St. Petersburg	USA	Mahaffey Theater	none	—	—
August 28, 2003	West Palm Beach	USA	Coral Sky Amphitheatre	none	—	—
Leg 3: Australian leg
September 13, 2003	Brisbane	Australia	Brisbane Entertainment Centre	n/a	—	—
September 15, 2003	Melbourne	Australia	Vodafone Arena	n/a	—	—
September 18, 2003	Canberra	Australia	Royal Theatre	n/a	—	—
September 19, 2003	Sydney	Australia	Sydney Entertainment Centre	n/a	—	—
September 20, 2003	New Castle	Australia	Newcastle Entertainment Centre	n/a	—	—
Leg 4: Asian Leg
September 24, 2003	Fukuoka	Japan	Sunpalace Hall	n/a	—	—
September 25, 2003	Osaka	Japan	Osaka-jō Hall	n/a	—	—
September 27, 2003	Tokyo	Japan	Tokyo Bay NK Hall	n/a	—	—
September 28, 2003	Tokyo	Japan	Tokyo Bay NK Hall	n/a	—	—
September 30, 2003	Tokyo	Japan	Zepp	n/a	—	—
October 1, 2003	Tokyo	Japan	Zepp	n/a	—	—
October 2, 2003	Nagoya	Japan	Shimm Hall	n/a	—	—
October 4, 2003	Seoul	South Korea	Olympic Fencing Stadium	n/a	—	—
Leg 5: Autumn North American leg
October 10, 2003	Los Angeles	United States	Greek Theatre	n/a	—	—
October 12, 2003	San Francisco	United States	Warfield Theatre	n/a	—	—
October 14, 2003	Denver	United States	Fillmore Auditorium	n/a	—	—
October 16, 2003	Minneapolis	United States	Roy Wilkins Auditorium	n/a	—	—
October 17, 2003	Chicago	United States	Aragon Ballroom	n/a	—	—
October 18, 2003	Milwaukee	United States	Eagles Club	n/a	—	—
October 20, 2003	Hamilton	Canada	Copps Coliseum	n/a	—	—
October 22, 2003	New York City	United States	Roseland Ballroom	n/a	—	—
October 23, 2003	Boston	United States	Orpheum Theatre	n/a	—	—
October 25, 2003	Washington, D.C.	United States	9:30 Club	n/a	—	—
October 26, 2003	Philadelphia	United States	Tower Theater	n/a	—	—
October 28, 2003	St. Louis	United States	Freakers Ball	n/a	—	—
October 30, 2003^{2}	Kansas City	United States	Freakers Ball	n/a	—	—
October 31, 2003	Dallas	United States	Smirnoff Music Centre	n/a	—	—
November 1, 2003	New Orleans	United States	Voodoo Experience (City Park)	n/a	—	—
November 5, 2003	Monterrey	Mexico	Auditorio Coca-Cola	n/a	—	—
November 7, 2003	Mexico City	Mexico	Foro Sol	n/a	—	—
Leg 6: Autumn European Leg
November 19, 2003	Hamburg	Germany	Color Line Arena	n/a	—	—
November 20, 2003	Berlin	Germany	Velodrom	n/a	—	—
November 23, 2003	Birmingham	England	NEC Arena	n/a	—	—
November 25, 2003	Manchester	England	MEN Arena	n/a	—	—
November 26, 2003	London	England	Alexandra Palace	n/a	—	—
November 28, 2003	Paris	France	Palais Omnisports de Paris-Bercy	n/a	—	—
November 29, 2003	Dortmund	Germany	Westfalenhallen	n/a	—	—
November 30, 2003	Zürich	Switzerland	Hallenstadion	n/a	—	—
December 4, 2003	Madrid	Spain	Palacio Vistalegre	n/a	—	—
December 5, 2003	Barcelona	Spain	Pavelló Club Joventut Badalona	n/a	—	—
December 7, 2003	Frankfurt	Germany	Festhalle Frankfurt	n/a	—	—
December 8, 2003	Munich	Germany	Olympiahalle	n/a	—	—
December 10, 2003	Milan	Italy	Mazda Palace	n/a	—	—
December 12, 2003	Vienna	Austria	Wiener Stadthalle	n/a	—	—
December 14, 2003	Amsterdam	Netherlands	Heineken Music Hall	n/a	—	—
December 16, 2003	Copenhagen	Denmark	Valby Idrætspark	n/a	—	—
December 18, 2003	Oslo	Norway	Oslo Spektrum	n/a	—	—
December 19, 2003	Stockholm	Sweden	Hovet	n/a	—	—

- ^1 Non-Ozzfest shows.
- ^2 Show cancelled early. See cancelled or rescheduled shows for more info.

=== Cancelled or rescheduled shows ===
List of cancelled concerts, showing date, city, country, venue and reason for cancellation
Date	City	Country	Venue	Reason
Leg 1: Spring European Leg
June 7, 2003	Milan	Italy	A Day at the Border	Rescheduled to June 22, 2003, after Manson contracted tracheitis.
Leg 2: Ozzfest 2003
August 11, 2003	Buffalo	United States	Darien Lake Performing Arts Center	Banned by Six Flags management for being "inappropriate for the venue"
Leg 5: Autumn North American Leg
October 30, 2003	Kansas City	USA	Freakers Ball at Kansas City International Raceway	Concert promoters cancelled the show mid-way after crowd surge broke the barricades twice. The cancellation incited a riot.
Leg 6: Autumn European Leg
December 2, 2003	Marseille	France	Le Dôme de Marseille	Cancelled due to flooding.
Leg 7: Winter North American Leg
Joint tour with Jane's Addiction and The Used
December 27, 2003	Auburn Hills	United States	The Palace of Auburn Hills	Jane's Addiction pulled out due to exhaustion from touring. After The Used also pulled out, the entire leg was cancelled.
December 28, 2003	Fairfax	United States	Patriot Center	Jane's Addiction pulled out due to exhaustion from touring. After The Used also pulled out, the entire leg was cancelled.
December 31, 2003	New York City	United States	Madison Square Garden	Jane's Addiction pulled out due to exhaustion from touring. After The Used also pulled out, the entire leg was cancelled.
January 2, 2004	Lowell	United States	Tsongas Center	Jane's Addiction pulled out due to exhaustion from touring. After The Used also pulled out, the entire leg was cancelled.
January 3, 2004	Camden	United States	Tweeter Center at the Waterfront	Jane's Addiction pulled out due to exhaustion from touring. After The Used also pulled out, the entire leg was cancelled.
