= Neverland (disambiguation) =

Neverland is the fictional island in the writings of J. M. Barrie, the home of Peter Pan.

Neverland, Never Land, or Never Never Land may also refer to:

== Films and television ==
- Never Never Land (film), a 1980 British film starring Petula Clark
- Never Never Land, the secret base of operations in Seven Days
- "Neverland" (CSI: Crime Scene Investigation), a 2010 television episode
- "Neverland" (Dawson's Creek), a 2000 television episode
- "Neverland" (NCIS), a 2015 television episode
- Neverland (film), a 2003 indie film written and directed by Damion Dietz
- Neverland (miniseries), a 2011 Syfy Channel prequel to the Peter Pan story
- Return to Never Land, a 2002 sequel to the Disney film Peter Pan
- Nevrland, a 2019 Austrian film

== Music ==
=== Albums ===
- Never, Never, Land, a 2003 album by British band UNKLE
- Never, Neverland, a 1990 album and a song by Canadian band Annihilator
- Never Land (EP), a 2014 EP by Andy Mineo
- Neverland (Skold EP), 1996
- Neverland (Cosmic Girls EP), 2020
- Neverland (Misono album), 2007
- Neverland (The Mission album), 1995
- Neverland (Night Ranger album), 1997
- Neverland (U-KISS album), 2011
- Neverland (Fanatic Crisis album), 2003
- Neverland, a 2020 EP by Andrew Hyatt
- Never Never Land (Jane Monheit album), 2000
- Never Never Land (Pink Fairies album), 1971, or the title song
- Neverland, a 2025 album by Ulver

=== Songs ===
- "Neverland" (Kid Cudi song), 2025
- "Neverland" (F.T. Island song), 2012
- "Neverland" (Andrew Hyatt song), 2020
- "Never Never Land" (song), a 2008 song by Lyfe Jennings
- "Never-never Land", a 2022 song by Collar
- "Neverland", by symphonic metal project Avantasia from the 2002 album The Metal Opera Part II
- "Neverland (The Star)", by metalcore band In Hearts Wake from the 2012 album Divination
- "Neverland", by electronic duo The Knife, from the 2006 album Silent Shout
- "Neverland", by rock band Marillion from the 2004 album Marbles
- "Neverland", by industrial band Skold from the 1996 album Skold
- "Never Land (A Fragment)", by British gothic rock band The Sisters of Mercy from the 1987 album Floodland
- "Never Never Land", by Jule Styne from the 1954 musical Peter Pan
- "Neverland", from Finding Neverland (soundtrack)
- "Neverland", from Finding Neverland (musical)
  - also covered by Zendaya

=== Other music ===
- Dreamtone & Iris Mavraki's Neverland, a power metal project
- Neverland (band), a 1980s Japanese band known for anime theme songs
- Fandom name of (G)I-dle

== Other ==
- Never Land Books, a series of chapter books set in Never Land
- Neverland (audio drama), a 2002 Doctor Who audio play
- Neverland (company), a Japanese video game developer
- Neverland Ranch, the California property owned by Michael Jackson from 1987 to 2008
- Neverland, a fictional Weapon X Marvel Comics death camp for mutants

== See also ==
- Finding Neverland (disambiguation)
