= Blankenship =

- Language: English, Welsh

Origin
- Meaning: From Blenkinsopp (placename in Northumberland), etymology from Medieval English uncertain. OR; From Blencarn (a pre-Roman village) meaning "hill with a Cairn", from the Welsh "Blaen" (top) and "Carn" (a Cairn).
- Region of origin: Medieval, Northern Europe

Other names
- Variant forms: Blankinship, Blenkinsopp, Blenkinsop, Blankenship

Blankenship is a family name that may refer to:

- Beau Blankenship (born 1990), American football player
- Ben Blankenship (born 1988), American Olympic middle-distance runner
- Bill Blankenship (born 1956), American football coach and player
- Brian Blankenship (born 1963), retired professional American football player
- Cliff Blankenship (1880–1956), American baseball player
- Cooper Blankenship (1929–2015), American politician
- Don Blankenship (born 1950), former chairman and CEO of the Massey Energy coal mining corporation
- Donnie Blankenship, American convicted murderer
- Erin Blankenship, American statistics educator
- G. T. Blankenship (1928–2024), American lawyer and politician
- Georgiana M. Blankenship (1861–1936), American pioneer and author
- Greg Blankenship (born 1954), American football player
- Homer Blankenship (1902–1974), American baseball player
- J. Richard Blankenship (born 1959), American diplomat
- Jacob Blankenship (born 1994), American pole vaulter
- Jacob Blankenship (basketball) (born 1989), Greek-American basketball player
- Josh Blankenship (born 1980), American football player and coach
- Kenny Blankenship, the name given to the character portrayed by personality Sonomanma Higashi and voiced by Christopher Darga, on MXC, the American parody/adaptation of Takeshi's Castle
- Kevin Blankenship (born 1963), American baseball player
- Kim Blankenship, American sociologist and HIV/AIDS researcher
- Lance Blankenship, (born 1963), retired Major League Baseball utility player
- Loyd Blankenship (born 1965), American computer hacker and writer
- Mark Blankenship (born 1978), writer and blogger
- Rachel Blankenship (born September 2, 1995), American soccer player
- Reed Blankenship (born 1999), American football player
- Robert E. Blankenship, American chemist
- Rodrigo Blankenship (born 1997), American football placekicker
- Ted Blankenship (1901–1945), American baseball player
- Tom Blankenship (born 1978), American bass guitarist for the band My Morning Jacket
- William Blankenship (1928–2017), American opera singer

== Other uses ==
- Blankenship is the name of a song by American indie rock band DIIV, from their third studio album Deceiver.
