= Shotgun Messiah (album) =

Studio album by Shotgun Messiah
- Released: 12 September 1989
- Studios: CCM Studio, KMH Studios, Can-AM Recorders
- Genres: Glam metal, heavy metal, hard rock
- Length: 38:32
- Label: Relativity
- Producers: Harry Cody, Tim Tim

Shotgun Messiah chronology
Shotgun Messiah (1989)	Second Coming (1991)

Singles from Shotgun Messiah
- 1. "Shout It Out" / "The Explorer" Released: 1989; 2. "Don't Care 'bout Nothin'" Released: 1990

Professional ratings
Review scores
Source	Rating
Allmusic	3.5/5 stars

Shotgun Messiah is the debut album by Swedish hard rock band Shotgun Messiah, released on 12 September 1989 through Relativity Records. The album is a remix of the album Welcome to Bop City, released under the band's former name Kingpin. Described as "cocky, loud and rough", Shotgun Messiah would go on to sell almost 500,000 copies. The band toured North America in support the album.

== Track listing ==
No.	Title	Writer(s)	Length
1.	"Bop City"	Harry Cody, J.K. Knox, Tim Tim, Zinny J. Zan	3:54
2.	"Don't Care 'bout Nothin'"	Cody, Knox, Tim	4:20
3.	"Shout It Out"	Cody, Knox, Tim	4:11
4.	"Squeezin' Teazin'"	Cody, Knox, Tim	4:05
5.	"The Explorer"	Cody, Tord Jacobsson	3:52
6.	"Nowhere Fast"	Cody, Tim	3:59
7.	"Dirt Talk"	Cody, Tim Zan	4:30
8.	"I'm Your Love"	Cody, Tim	4:53
9.	"Nervous"	Cody, Knox, Tim, Zan	4:07
10.	"Carnival Exit" (hidden track)		0:38
Total length:			38:32

== Personnel ==
- Zinny J. Zan – vocals
- Harry K. Cody – guitars, production
- Tim Tim (Tim Sköld) – bass, production
- Stixx Galore – drums
- Tord Jacobsson – drums on "The Explorer"
- Bill Freesh – assistant producer and engineer
- Matt Olausson – assistant producer and engineer
