= Blood Tracks =

- Promotional poster
- Directed by: Mats Olsson; Derek Ford (Note: Uncredited.)
- Written by: Mats Olsson; Anna Wolf
- Produced by: Tom Sjoberg
- Starring: Jeff Harding; Michael Fitzpatrick; Naomi Kaneda
- Cinematography: Hans Dittmer
- Edited by: David Gilbert
- Music by: Dag Unenge
- Production company: Smart Egg Pictures
- Distributed by: Succéfilm AB (Sweden); Avatar Film Corporation Limited (United Kingdom)
- Release date: 1985
- Running time: 88 minutes
- Countries: Sweden; United Kingdom
- Language: English

Blood Tracks is a 1985 British slasher film directed by Mats Olsson, and starring Jeff Harding, Michael Fitzpatrick, and Naomi Kaneda. It follows a film crew shooting a rock music video at an abandoned factory in the Colorado Rockies who are stalked by a murderous family living there after an avalanche strands them. The film also features members of the Swedish rock band Easy Action.

== Plot ==
A father comes home drunk to his family. He fights with his wife, struggling over a knife she grabbed to defend herself. In their struggle, the oldest son, Lee, ends up pushed, causing him to have a limp. The husband cuts the wife’s throat, but it was not fatal. His wife stabs him with the knife, then runs away with her five children in tow, as another man (presumably an uncle) stays behind. Narration states that the family hid out for the next 40 years.

In 1985, rock band Solid Gold travels to a snowy mountain to shoot their latest music video. Arriving at the lodge, the band are swarmed by fans and reporters. They are granted the use of a rescue helicopter for the duration of their shoot. Mountain guides warn of avalanche conditions, though the band decides to press on.

Frank, a lodge worker, ventures into a nearby abandoned factory, and sets off a rudimentary alarm system set up by the family from the prologue, who have taken refuge in the factory. He is killed by one of the sons, who then runs off. Driving up the mountain to the cabin, the band see the factory and decide to use it as a backdrop for their music video. Lee hides the worker’s body, watching as the crew start setting up.

As the band shoot the music video for their song Blood Tracks, the crew sees an avalanche, and video director Bob stops shooting for the day. As everyone returns to the vehicles, John the mountain guide drives to check if the avalanche blocked the roads, promising to call the CB radio in the cabin if he makes it through.

Cameraman Nick is asked to get shots of the factory for filler in the video. He ventures inside, being spied on by the family. The band and crew make it to the cabin, being followed by Kitt, the son who killed the lodge worker. Bob tells sound-man Dave to fetch Nick, still filming the factory. Nick is injured by a booby-trap set off by Sonny, one of the sons, and Dave takes him to the cabin. Nick reviews the camera footage, and another avalanche occurs. Band member Pete and his girlfriend Mary sneak off to the car to have sex. While the crew tries getting the CB to work, the avalanche reaches the cabin road, trapping Pete and Mary inside the car.

The crew manage to get them free of the car and back in the cabin. Bob decides to have a party in the cabin until help arrives, and Suzie, John’s girlfriend, calls him out for his stupidity. Bob is seduced by one of the girls, and dismisses Nick’s concerns about something suspicious in the factory footage. Dave ventures outside to try and record some of the avalanche sounds. He picks up the footsteps of one of the family members, and runs inside the factory to try and catch him. Nick shows Bob the footage he caught of the booby trap that injured him, saying someone is inside the factory. Slowing the footage down, Bob sees the face of the family member setting off the trap. Dave is killed when Kitt grabs him and breaks his neck. Dave’s girlfriend Kerry goes inside the factory to look for him, finding his tape and microphone, left behind when Kitt dragged him away. She makes it back to the cabin, where Bob and Nick try using the CB radio from outside, theorizing the mountain might be blocking the signal.

Back at the lodge, John tells Police Chief Creighton that a trucker on the road picked up the cabin’s CB, and that Frank’s wife said he hasn’t come home. The helicopter can’t be used, so John tries getting a snowmobile. Bob and Nick couldn’t reach anyone, heading back inside. Kerry plays Dave’s tape recording for everyone, and they hear him being attacked. Kerry, Nick and Bob go to the factory to search for Dave, while the others stay behind. The band members and their girlfriends sneak off to have sex. Kee and his girlfriend Linda arrive at the factory. As Kee hides to pop out and scare Linda, he is caught and decapitated, with Linda getting captured. As Kerry and Bob split up to cover more ground, Nick is suddenly set on fire, and Kerry is captured. As Bob tries rescuing Kerry, he finds Linda tied up, and accidentally activates a booby-trap which cuts her in half.

Awakening in the family’s lair, Kerry grabs a frying pan and knocks out the family member guarding her, running away to try and find Bob. Outside, Suzie uses the CB to contact John, who has procured a snowmobile to try and reach the cabin. Though reception is choppy, John manages to communicate with Suzie and get information about the group’s situation. He instructs her to wait in the cabin until he arrives.

Bob escapes the factory, but Kerry is caught by one of the sons and thrown over a railing, where she is impaled. John leaves on the snowmobile to try and reach the cabin. The family attacks the cabin, killing Pete and Mary and capturing Louise. Suzie hides and witnesses Louise being taken to the factory. Bob reaches the cabin, and finds Sarah, who also managed to avoid capture. John arrives on the snowmobile, and soon arms Bob with a gun taken from a hidden cache. He also gives him flares to use to try and signal the helicopter. Suzie tries rescuing Louise, who is chained up in a pit by the family. The family is alerted to Suzie’s presence by John trying to contact her over the CB, and she is captured.

Bob goes to try and kill the family, and leaves Sarah at the cabin to signal the helicopter. A remaining band member is killed by Kitt, who chases Sarah outside. She flees on the snowmobile, inadvertently dragging Kitt behind on the winch. He manages to throw her off, and soon kills her. Bob and John arrive at the factory to try and rescue the women. John and one of the sons fight, but John manages to get the upper hand and stab him in the throat.

Lee finally arrives back at the factory, and he expresses horror at his brothers having killed everyone. He begs his mother to stop them, then frees Suzie and Louise, urging them to leave. Bob captures Sonny and shoots him in revenge for his friends’ deaths. Lee kills Bob in revenge for his brother’s killing. Louise fights with the mother, managing to set her on fire. Suzie reunites with John, but they are unable to save Louise from being killed by a booby trap.

John signals Creighton in the helicopter, and he lands to pick them up. John and Creighton kill Kitt and the other remaining son, and Suzie is attacked by Lee. John blasts his arm off with the shotgun, and his hand has Suzie’s missing necklace clasped in it. She realizes he was only trying to give her her necklace back. The survivors board the helicopter, and Lee, still in the factory, cauterizes his arm wound. As the helicopter flies away, Suzie realizes Lee is still alive.

== Cast ==
- Jeff Harding as John
- Michael Fitzpatrick as Bob
- Naomi Kaneda as Suzie
- Brad Powell as Nick
- Peter Merrill as Dave
- Harriet Robinson as Louise
- Tina Shaw as Sarah
- Frances Kelly as Linda
- Karina Lee as Mary
- Helena Jacks as Joanna
- Lotte Heise as Carrie
- Zinny J. Zan as Solid Gold Band Member (credited as Zin Zan)
- Chris Lind as Pete/Solid Gold Band Member
- Alex Tyrone as Solid Gold Band Member
- Freddie van Gerber as Chris/Solid Gold Band Member
- Kee Marcello as Kee/Solid Gold Band Member

== Production ==
The film was produced by Smart Egg Pictures, a London-based production company that also produced Wes Craven's A Nightmare on Elm Street (1984).

== Release ==
=== Home media ===
Vinegar Syndrome released the film on Blu-ray in November 2024, first made available for purchase through their online store as part of their Black Friday sale.

== Source ==
- Kääpä, Pietari; Gustafsson, Tommy (2021). The Politics of Nordsploitation: History, Industry, Audiences. New York City, New York: Bloomsbury. ISBN 978-1-501-32730-8.
- Stine, Scott Aaron (2015) [2003]. The Gorehound's Guide to Splatter Films of the 1980s. Jefferson, North Carolina: McFarland. ISBN 978-0-786-41532-8.
