= Violent New Breed =

Studio album by Shotgun Messiah
- Released: 28 September 1993
- Studios: Atlantis, Stockholm, Sweden
- Genres: Industrial metal, hard rock
- Length: 43:43
- Label: Relativity
- Producers: Ulf "Cybersank" Sandquist; Shotgun Messiah

Shotgun Messiah chronology
Second Coming (1991)	Violent New Breed (1993)

Singles from Violent New Breed
- 1. "Enemy in Me" Released: 1993

Professional ratings
Review scores
Source	Rating
AllMusic	4/5 stars

Violent New Breed is the third and final album by Swedish rock band Shotgun Messiah, released on 28 September 1993 through Relativity Records. Breaking from their previous albums, Violent New Breed featured a more industrial rock/metal sound. The band toured in support of the album and later disbanded following the conclusion of the tour.

== Track listing ==
All tracks are written by Shotgun Messiah.

No.	Title	Length
1.	"I'm a Gun"	3:29
2.	"Come Down"	3:12
3.	"Violent New Breed"	4:57
4.	"Enemy in Me"	4:05
5.	"Revolution"	3:38
6.	"Monkey Needs"	3:22
7.	"Rain"	3:46
8.	"Jihad"	3:53
9.	"Side F/X"	2:08
10.	"Sex"	4:17
11.	"Overkill"	3:14
12.	"I Come in Peace"	3:43
Total length:		43:43

== Personnel ==
- Tim Skold – vocals, bass, programming, arrangements, production
- Harry K. Cody – guitars, programming, arrangements, production
- Ulf "Cybersank" Sandquist – programming, arrangements, production
- Stefan Glaumann – mixing
- Michael Lucero (?UC-Is-?U-Get) – cover art
