= Never Never =

Never Never may refer to:

== Places ==
- Never Never (Australian outback), a colloquial name for the Australian outback
- Never Never River, a stream in New South Wales, Australia

== Songs ==
- "Never Never" (The Assembly song), 1983
- "Never Never" (Korn song), 2013
- "Never Never", by Brick & Lace from Love Is Wicked, 2007
- "Never Never", by Drenchill, featuring Indiiana, 2019
- "Never Never", by Letty Katts, 1945
- "Never-Never", by Lush from Split, 1994
- "Never Never", by Sun-El Musician from To the World & Beyond, 2020
- "Never Never", by Warm Jets, 1997

== Other uses ==
- Never Never (TV series), a 2000 British drama series
- Never Never, a 2008 novel by David Gaffney
- Never Never, a 2016 novel by James Patterson and Candice Fox
- Never Never, a short film directed by Jordan Scott

== See also ==
- Never Never Never, a 1973 album by Shirley Bassey
- We of the Never Never, a 1908 autobiographical novel by Jeannie Gunn
  - We of the Never Never (film), a 1982 Australian drama based on the novel
- Never Ever (disambiguation)
- Neverland (disambiguation), including uses of "Never Never Land"
