= The Golden Age of Grotesque =

Studio album by Marilyn Manson
- Released: May 13, 2003
- Recorded: 2002–2003
- Studios: Doppelherz Blood Treatment Facility, Los Angeles; Ocean Way, Hollywood; The Mix Room, Burbank
- Genres: Industrial rock; industrial metal; nu metal
- Length: 57:32
- Labels: Nothing; Interscope
- Producers: Marilyn Manson; Tim Sköld

Marilyn Manson chronology
Holy Wood (In the Shadow of the Valley of Death) (2000)	The Golden Age of Grotesque (2003)	Lest We Forget: The Best Of (2004)

Singles from The Golden Age of Grotesque
- 1. "Mobscene" Released: April 22, 2003; 2. "This Is the New Shit" Released: September 1, 2003

The Golden Age of Grotesque is the fifth studio album by American rock band Marilyn Manson. It was released on May 13, 2003, by Nothing and Interscope Records, and was their first album to feature former KMFDM member Tim Sköld, who joined after longtime bassist Twiggy Ramirez amicably left the group over creative differences. It was also their final studio album to feature keyboardist Madonna Wayne Gacy and guitarist John 5, who would both acrimoniously quit before the release of the band's next studio album.

The record was produced by Marilyn Manson and Sköld, with co-production from Ben Grosse. Musically, it is less metallic than the band's earlier work, instead being more electronic and beat-driven. This was done to avoid creating music similar to hip-hop influenced forms of nu metal, a then-predominant genre that the vocalist considered cliché. Despite this, the album's sound has been compared to the likes of several nu metal bands, notably Slipknot and Korn. Manson collaborated with artist Gottfried Helnwein to create several projects associated with the album, including Doppelherz, a 25-minute surrealist short film which was released on limited edition units of the record as a bonus DVD. The Golden Age of Grotesque was also the title of the Manson's first art exhibition.

The album's lyrical content is relatively straightforward, and was inspired by the swing, burlesque, cabaret and vaudeville movements of Germany's Weimar Republic-era, specifically 1920s Berlin. In an extended metaphor, Manson compares his own work to the Entartete Kunst banned by the Nazi regime as he attempts to examine the mindset of lunatics and children during times of crisis. Several songs incorporate elements commonly found in playground chants and nursery rhymes. "Mobscene" (stylized as "mOBSCENE") and "This Is the New Shit" were released as singles, and a controversial music video was released for "Saint" (stylized as "(s)AINT").

The record received mixed reviews from mainstream music critics: some praised its concept and production, while others criticized its lyrics and described the album as uneven. Despite this, it was a commercial success, selling over 400,000 copies in Europe on its first week to debut at number one on Billboard's European Top 100 Albums. It also topped various national record charts, including Austria, Canada, Germany, Italy, Switzerland and the US Billboard 200. It was certified gold in many of these territories. "Mobscene" was nominated in the Best Metal Performance category at the 46th Annual Grammy Awards in 2004. The album was supported by the Grotesk Burlesk Tour.

== Background and recording ==
After the band completed work on what became their triptych of albums (2000's Holy Wood (In the Shadow of the Valley of Death), 1998's Mechanical Animals and 1996's Antichrist Superstar), the band was free to begin a fresh project. In late 2001, the eponymous vocalist worked with composer Marco Beltrami and former KMFDM multi-instrumentalist Tim Sköld to create an original score for the 2002 film Resident Evil. This was the second project on which Manson collaborated with Sköld, after the band's cover of "Tainted Love", which became an international hit when released as a single from the Not Another Teen Movie OST in 2001. The Resident Evil OST was released in March 2002, and included a remix of "The Fight Song" created by Slipknot drummer Joey Jordison. The soundtrack to Queen of the Damned was also released that month, which featured Manson performing lead vocals on the Jonathan Davis-composed track "Redeemer". On May 29, Sköld became an official band member when Twiggy Ramirez amicably left the group, citing creative differences.

The album was produced by Manson, Sköld, and Ben Grosse. It was recorded at Ocean Way Recording and the band's own Doppelherz Blood Treatment Facility in Los Angeles, as well as Grosse's The Mix Room in Burbank, California. Most of the songwriting effort was shared between Tim Sköld, John 5 and Manson, with the latter describing it as the most focused record in the band's discography. During the album's early stages of development, Manson indicated that both Jordison and Canadian musician Peaches had contributed to material, although neither artist appears on the album. Several songs on the record feature backing vocals by Andrew Baines of Tennessee, a 16-year-old fan who had been diagnosed with a terminal illness. This collaboration had been facilitated by the Make-A-Wish Foundation, with Manson saying that he "wanted to make Andrew a permanent part of history, sealed up in distortion and megabytes of plastic."

"We're in an era of music right now where heavy rock and aggressive things are very acceptable and very near approaching cliché. So it's important to keep pushing the boundary of how you make heavy music – and I want to continue to make really heavy music – but I want to do it in a way that isn't like everything else I hear when I turn on the radio."

— Marilyn Manson explaining the album's production aesthetic to MTV.

"Para-Noir" contains a distinctive guitar solo from John 5, who performed it in one take using an unfamiliar, out-of-tune guitar whilst blindfolded. "Ka-Boom Ka-Boom" was the final song composed for the record, and was written in response to criticism made by the head of the A&R division of Interscope Records, who said that the album "had no kaboom". In a 2008 interview with a now-defunct fansite, Manson claimed to have performed the majority of the keyboards and synthesizer on the album, and not the band's longtime keyboardist Madonna Wayne Gacy. According to Manson, Gacy displayed little interest in contributing creatively, and eventually detached himself from the rest of the group to such a degree that he refused to attend studio sessions when informed that recording was to begin in June 2002. As a result, Manson received musical composition credits for eleven of the fifteen tracks on the record, in addition to his usual lyrical credits.

Musically, the album is more electronic and beat-driven than preceding releases, with reviewers commenting that its sound is at times reminiscent of KMFDM. This has been attributed to Sköld, who was a member of that band immediately prior to his arrival in Marilyn Manson. It is also not as metallic as their earlier work, with Manson explaining to MTV that he wanted to create music which was dissimilar to the nu metal being played on radio at the time. He also noted the influence of early industrial rock acts such as Ministry, Big Black and Nitzer Ebb on the material. Early twentieth-century German composer Kurt Weill was also claimed as an influence, along with the lucid dreams Manson was having during the album's production, elaborating that he would "wake up and say, 'I want to write a song that sounds like a stampeding elephant' or 'I want to write a song that sounds like a burning piano'."

== Themes and artwork ==
"This record is broken down to the simplest, most important thing, and that's relationships — whether they're between people or between ideas. I use analogies of art and decadence. How things in Berlin in the '30s got to such a great point, and some of the greatest things were created, and it was crushed by evil, jealous, bitter conservative powers. And the same thing happened in America, several times and continuously, with art and with myself."

— Marilyn Manson explaining the motivation behind the album's premise to MTV.

The vocalist would later describe the period surrounding The Golden Age of Grotesque as being one of his most creative. He was inspired by then-girlfriend, burlesque performance artist Dita Von Teese, into exploring the decadent swing, burlesque, cabaret and vaudeville movements of Germany's Weimar Republic-era, specifically 1920s Berlin. He explained to Kerrang! that the album's content was inspired by "the lengths that people [in pre-Nazi Germany] went to in order to live their lives to the fullest and to make their entertainment as imaginative and extreme as possible." He also found inspiration in the flamboyance of Dandyism, along with the cultural and artistic movements of Surrealism and Dadaism, the life of the Marquis de Sade, and the theater of the grotesque.

Photograph by Gottfried Helnwein which accompanied Manson's essay to the Rock and Roll Hall of Fame and Museum. Helnwein later expressed dissatisfaction that this image was not selected as the album's cover.

Eschewing the lyrical depth and volume of symbolism found on Holy Wood (In the Shadow of the Valley of Death) (2000), the album is relatively straightforward: its lyrical content primarily deals with relationships, and, in an extended metaphor, Manson compares his own often-criticized work to the Entartete Kunst banned by the Nazi regime. The record utilizes the narrative mode of stream of consciousness as Manson attempts to examine the response of the human psyche during times of crisis, particularly focusing on the mindset of lunatics and children. These were of particular interest to the vocalist, as "they don't follow the rules [of society]." Several songs incorporate elements commonly found in playground chants and nursery rhymes, which Manson would "pervert into something ugly and lurid."

Manson began his long-term collaboration with Austrian-Irish artist Gottfried Helnwein in May 2002, collaborating on several projects associated with the album. In addition to the album artwork, the pair created large-scale multi-media installation art pieces that would go on to be exhibited in various galleries throughout Europe and the United States. These were also displayed at the album's launch party at The Key Club in Los Angeles. They also worked together on the music video to lead single "Mobscene" (stylized as "mOBSCENE"), as well as images which accompanied Manson's essay for The Rock and Roll Hall of Fame and Museum. Helnwein later expressed disappointment that the latter was not selected as the album cover. Many of the images found in the album artwork were inspired by illustrations found in Mel Gordon's 2000 book Voluptuous Panic: The Erotic World of Weimar Berlin. Concerned that Gordon might take issue with use of the book's material, Manson called Gordon, who said he could not imagine a greater compliment than a popular music album based on an academic book. The Golden Age of Grotesque was also the title of Manson's first art exhibition, which took place in September 2002 at the Los Angeles Contemporary Exhibitions Center.

== Release and promotion ==
Album logo

On February 18, 2003, Manson revealed the album's release date and track listing via the band's official website. The album was preceded by the release of its lead single, "Mobscene", which was serviced to mainstream and alternative rock radio formats on April 21. Its music video was directed by Manson and Thomas Kloss. The single was backed by a remix of the song created by The Prodigy vocalist Keith Flint. The song became one of the band's biggest worldwide hits, peaking in the top 20 of numerous national record charts, and at number one in Portugal. It peaked at number 18 on Billboard's Mainstream Rock Chart, making it their best-performing single on that chart since "The Dope Show" reached number 12 in 1998. The song was nominated in the Best Metal Performance category at the 46th Annual Grammy Awards in 2004, losing out to Metallica's "St. Anger".

A series of unique launch parties titled "Grotesque Burlesque" took place in advance of the album's US release on May 13. The first of these occurred in Berlin on April 4, followed by several more shows throughout Europe. The final event took place at The Key Club in Los Angeles on May 12. These shows featured large-scale artwork by Helnwein and Manson, a burlesque performance by Von Teese, and an acoustic set from Manson backed by two female pianists. Limited edition copies of the album included a DVD entitled Doppelherz (Double Heart), a 25-minute surrealist short film directed by Manson which featured art direction by Helnwein. The film's audio consists of a repeating loop of album opener "Thaeter", accompanied by a stream-of-consciousness spoken-word recitation from Manson.

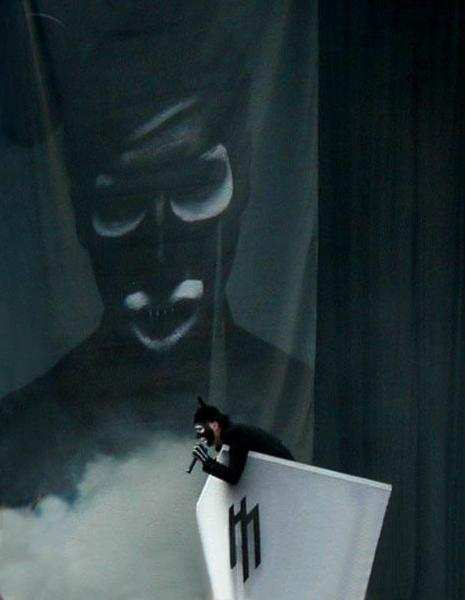
Manson performing on the Grotesk Burlesk Tour.

On May 16, the band performed both "Mobscene" and "This Is the New Shit" on Jimmy Kimmel Live!. The latter was released as the album's second single, and its music video was shot in Belgium on June 17 and featured over 100 fans. A controversial music video was independently produced for the song "Saint" (stylized as "(s)AINT"). Directed by Asia Argento and containing scenes of violence, nudity, masturbation, drug-use and self-mutilation, Interscope considered it "too graphic" and refused to be associated with the project, although it was later included on international editions of the Lest We Forget: The Best Of bonus DVD. NME referred to the video as "one of the most explicit music videos ever made", and both Time and SF Weekly included it on their respective lists of the 'Most Controversial Music Videos'.

The album was supported by the Grotesk Burlesk Tour, with Peaches performing as opening act on select dates. It began with a series of headlining shows in Europe, followed by the band's stint as one of the headlining acts at the 2003 Ozzfest. Much of the elaborate attire and clothing worn by the band on tour was tailored by French fashion designer Jean Paul Gaultier. The stage was designed to resemble that of classic vaudeville and burlesque stage shows of the 1930s. Two female dancers would be present on stage for most of the show, and would be dressed in either vintage burlesque costumes or military uniforms and garters. They would also perform some live instrumentation, such as floor toms during "Doll-Dagga Buzz-Buzz Ziggety-Zag", and piano during "The Golden Age of Grotesque". They performed the latter whilst dressed to resemble conjoined twins. Manson would change his appearance numerous times throughout each show: he would wear elongated arms which he would swing in a marching manner as he walked along the stage, and would don blackface while wearing an Allgemeine SS-style peaked police cap or Mickey Mouse ears. The stage also utilized a series of elaborate platforms and pulpits, from atop of which he would quote random lines from Doppelherz between songs. The tour was set to end with five concerts featuring Marilyn Manson opening for Jane's Addiction. However, these shows were cancelled by the latter band, with Perry Farrell citing exhaustion as the reason.

== Controversies ==
On June 30, 2003, the mutilated body of fourteen-year old schoolgirl Jodi Jones was discovered in woodland near her home in Easthouses, Scotland. The injuries sustained by Jones closely resembled those of actress Elizabeth Short, who was murdered in 1947 and was popularly referred to by media as the Black Dahlia. Jones' boyfriend, then-fifteen year old Luke Mitchell, was arrested on suspicion of her murder ten months later. During a search of his home, detectives confiscated a copy of The Golden Age of Grotesque containing the short film Doppelherz. It was purchased two days after Jones' death. A ten-minute excerpt from the film, as well as several paintings by Manson depicting the Black Dahlia's mutilated body, were presented as evidence during the trial.

Although Mitchell's defense attorney argued that Jones' injuries were inconsistent with those found in Manson's paintings, Lord Nimmo Smith said during sentencing that he did "not feel able to ignore the fact that there was a degree of resemblance between the injuries inflicted on Jodi and those shown in the Marilyn Manson paintings of Elizabeth Short that we saw. I think that you carried an image of the paintings in your memory when you killed Jodi." Mitchell was found guilty of murder and sentenced to serve a minimum of twenty years in prison. Manson later dismissed claims that his work inspired the murder, arguing instead that "the education that parents give their children and the influences they receive" plays a more direct role in violent behavior, and criticised media who attempted to "[put] the blame elsewhere."

The Golden Age of Grotesque is the final studio album to feature longtime keyboardist Madonna Wayne Gacy and guitarist John 5, who would both acrimoniously quit the group over the following years. John 5's relationship with Manson had soured over the course of the Grotesk Burlesk Tour. According to John, Manson spoke to him only once during the entire tour: "It was on my birthday and he turned to me and said, 'Happy birthday, faggot'—then walked away." Manson also displayed hostility towards the guitarist on stage. During a performance of "The Beautiful People" at the 2003 Rock am Ring festival, Manson kicked and then shoved John, who appeared to respond in anger by throwing his guitar to the ground and raising his fists to Manson, before resuming the song. John 5 later revealed that the "fight" was staged, and a regular occurrence in the band's stage performance, but that night John 5 had "snapped" because his sister had recently died. Gacy, who was also the band's last remaining original member – excluding Manson – quit shortly before the recording of the band's next studio album, Eat Me, Drink Me (2007). He would later file a $20 million lawsuit against Marilyn Manson for unpaid "partnership proceeds", accusing the vocalist of spending money earned by the band on "sick and disturbing purchases of Nazi memorabilia and taxidermy, including the skeleton of a young Chinese girl."

== Critical reception ==
Professional ratings
Aggregate scores
Source	Rating
Metacritic	60/100
Review scores
Source	Rating
AllMusic	3.5/5 stars
Alternative Press	4/5 stars
Drowned in Sound	7/10
E! Online	B
Entertainment Weekly	B−
The Guardian	3/5 stars
Mojo	3/5 stars
PopMatters	negative
Q	3/5 stars
Rolling Stone	3/5 stars

The album was released to mixed reviews. At Metacritic, which assigns a normalized rating out of 100 to reviews from mainstream critics, it received an average score 60, based on 12 reviews, which indicates "generally mixed or average reviews". Although appearing on several publication's year-end lists for 2003, other critics considered this to be the band's weakest album, arguing that it lacked thoughtful lyrics when compared to its predecessors. It won Metal Edge's 2004 Readers' Choice Award for "Album of the Year".

Several publications praised the album's concept, and for being more humorous than the band's preceding albums. Stephen Thomas Erlewine of AllMusic said: "In an era when heavy rockers have no idea what happened in the '80s, much less the '30s, it's hard not to warm to this, even if his music isn't your own personal bag." Barry McCallum of Independent Online called the album "reckless and uninhibited—but it's not all that hard to imagine Manson letting go; he's had fun here." Chronicles of Chaos also praised its concept, and went on to say that it might be one of the best albums in the band's discography. Alternative Press and Q each complimented the album's production, while Billboard highlighted the album's lyrical content and Manson's "diatribes on religion, sex and prejudice." Entertainment.ie called it an entertaining pop album, and summarized that "the pop world would be a much more boring place without [Marilyn Manson]—and that's what really counts."

PopMatters argued that while the album has several excellent songs, it is hindered by "inane" lyrics. BBC Music also criticized its lyrics, while Chris Long of BBC Manchester argued that while Manson was capable of producing "the finest metal around", The Golden Age of Grotesque demonstrated him "losing his touch". Barry Walters of Rolling Stone called the album uneven: praising its first half but criticizing the latter portion. A writer for Now Toronto claimed that Manson was lapsing into self-parody, and complained the album was not heavy enough. Although E! Online praised the band for being inventive, they said the album would not win over any new fans. This sentiment was echoed by Entertainment Weekly, who called it "inventive and powerful enough to merit intermittent attention, but ultimately crushed by the weight of its hoary pretensions."

== Commercial performance ==
Industry forecasters predicted that The Golden Age of Grotesque was on course to become the band's second number one album on the Billboard 200, following 1998's Mechanical Animals, with estimated first-week sales of around 150,000 copies. The album debuted at number one with first week sales of over 118,000 copies, at the time the lowest opening week total for a number one-debuting studio album since Nielsen SoundScan began tracking sales data in 1991. This figure was just 1,000 copies more than the first week sales of Holy Wood, which debuted at number thirteen in November 2000. Sales of the album dipped to 45,000 copies on its second week, resulting in a positional drop on the Billboard 200 to number 21. This broke the record previously held by Nine Inch Nails' 1999 album The Fragile for the largest drop from number one in the chart's history. The Golden Age of Grotesque held this record until Incubus' Light Grenades dropped to number 37 in December 2006. As of November 2008, the album has sold 526,000 copies in the US, making it the lowest-selling number one-debuting studio album of 2003. This was the second year the band achieved this, after Mechanical Animals became the lowest-selling number one-debuting studio album of 1998. It also entered the Canadian Albums Chart at number one, selling 11,500 copies on its first week.

The record was more successful internationally than the band's previous albums, particularly in Europe, where it sold over 400,000 copies during its first week to debut at number one on Billboard's European Top 100 Albums. It topped various national record charts, namely Austria, Germany, Italy and Switzerland, as well as the album chart of the Wallonia region of Belgium, and the UK Rock & Metal Albums Chart. It also peaked within the top five in France, Norway, Portugal, Spain, Sweden, and the United Kingdom. It attained gold certifications in several of these territories, including Austria (denoting 15,000 units), Switzerland (20,000 units), and France, Germany and the UK (100,000 copies each). In Australasia, the album peaked at number five in both Australia and Japan, and was certified gold in both countries for sales in excess of 35,000 and 100,000 copies, respectively. It also peaked at number 16 in New Zealand.

== Track listing ==
All lyrics are written by Marilyn Manson.

No.	Title	Music	Length
1.	"Thaeter"	Manson; Madonna Wayne Gacy; Tim Sköld	1:14
2.	"This Is the New Shit"	John 5; Manson; Sköld	4:20
3.	"Mobscene" ( (Note: "Mobscene" is stylized as "mOBSCENE".))	John 5; Manson	3:25
4.	"Doll-Dagga Buzz-Buzz Ziggety-Zag"	John 5; Sköld; Manson	4:11
5.	"Use Your Fist and Not Your Mouth"	John 5; Manson	3:34
6.	"The Golden Age of Grotesque"	John 5; Manson	4:05
7.	"Saint" ( (Note: "Saint" is stylized as "(s)AINT".))	John 5; Manson; Sköld	3:42
8.	"Ka-Boom Ka-Boom"	John 5; Sköld	4:02
9.	"Slutgarden"	John 5; Manson	4:06
10.	"♠" ( (Note: "♠" is listed as "Spade" on iTunes and Spotify.))	John 5	4:34
11.	"Para-noir"	John 5; Sköld; Gacy; Manson	6:01
12.	"The Bright Young Things"	John 5	4:19
13.	"Better of Two Evils"	Manson; John 5; Sköld; Gacy	3:48
14.	"Vodevil"	John 5; Sköld	4:39
15.	"Obsequey (The Death of Art)"	Manson; Sköld	1:34
Total length:			57:32

International bonus track
No.	Title	Writer(s)	Length
16.	"Tainted Love" (Gloria Jones cover; from Not Another Teen Movie)	Ed Cobb	3:24
Total length:			60:56

Japanese & UK bonus track
No.	Title	Writer(s)	Length
17.	"Baboon Rape Party"	Manson; Sköld	2:41
Total length:			63:37

Japanese bonus track
No.	Title	Writer(s)	Length
18.	"Paranoiac"	John 5; Gacy; Manson; Sköld	3:57
Total length:			67:34

Bonus DVD
No.	Title	Director	Length
1.	"Doppelherz"	Manson	26:06
Total length:			26:06

== Personnel ==
Credits adapted from the liner notes of The Golden Age of Grotesque.

- Recorded at the Doppelherz Blood Treatment Facility and at Ocean Way Recording in Los Angeles, with additional recording at The Mix Room in Burbank, California.
- Mixed at The Mix Room by Ben Grosse.
- Mastered by Tom Baker at Precision Mastering, Los Angeles.

Marilyn Manson

- Marilyn Manson – vocals, piano, keyboards, synthesizer bass, mellotron, saxophone, guitars, snare rolls, loops, digital editing, arrangements, producer, photography
- John 5 – guitars, piano, orchestration
- Tim Sköld – bass, guitars, accordion, keyboards, synth bass, loops, drum programming, digital editing, producer
- Madonna Wayne Gacy – keyboards, electronics, synthesizer
- Ginger Fish – drums, rhythm direction

Production

- Chuck Bailey – assistant engineer
- Andrew Baines – backing vocals
- Tom Baker – mastering
- Jon Blaine – hair stylist
- P. R. Brown – sleeve design
- Blumpy – digital editing
- Jeff Burns – assistant
- Ross Garfield – drum technician
- Ben Grosse – engineer, digital editing, producer, mixing
- Gottfried Helnwein – art direction
- Lily & Pat – vocals ("Mobscene" and "Para-noir")
- Perou – additional photography (inlay band photograph)
- Mark Williams – A&R

== Charts ==
=== Weekly charts ===
Chart (2003)	Peak position
Australian Albums (ARIA)	5
Australian Heavy Rock & Metal Albums (ARIA)	1
Austrian Albums (Ö3 Austria)	1
Belgian Albums (Ultratop Flanders)	4
Belgian Albums (Ultratop Wallonia)	1
Canadian Albums (Billboard)	1
Danish Albums (Hitlisten)	6
Dutch Albums (Album Top 100)	14
European Albums (Billboard)	1
Finnish Albums (Suomen virallinen lista)	8
French Albums (SNEP)	2
German Albums (Offizielle Top 100)	1
Greek Albums (IFPI)	6
Hungarian Albums (MAHASZ)	28
Irish Albums (IRMA)	7
Italian Albums (FIMI)	1
Japanese Albums (Oricon)	5
New Zealand Albums (RMNZ)	16
Norwegian Albums (VG-lista)	4
Polish Albums (ZPAV)	18
Portuguese Albums (AFP)	4
Scottish Albums (Official Charts)	4
Spanish Albums (PROMUSICAE)	5
Swedish Albums (Sverigetopplistan)	4
Swiss Albums (Schweizer Hitparade)	1
UK Albums (Official Charts)	4
UK Rock & Metal Albums (Official Charts)	1
US Billboard 200	1

=== Year-end charts ===
Chart (2003)	Position
Australian Heavy Rock & Metal Albums (ARIA)	11
Austrian Albums (Ö3 Austria)	44
Belgian Albums (Ultratop Wallonia)	43
French Albums (SNEP)	90
German Albums (Offizielle Top 100)	39
Swiss Albums (Schweizer Hitparade)	48
UK Albums (OCC)	177

== Certifications ==
Region	Certification	Certified units/sales
Australia (ARIA)	Gold	35,000^{^}
Austria (IFPI Austria)	Gold	15,000^{*}
France (SNEP)	Gold	100,000^{*}
Germany (BVMI)	Gold	100,000^{^}
Japan (RIAJ)	Gold	100,000^{^}
Portugal (AFP)	Silver	10,000^{^}
Russia (NFPF)	Gold	10,000^{*}
South Korea (GAON)	—	14,828
Switzerland (IFPI Switzerland)	Gold	20,000^{^}
United Kingdom (BPI)	Gold	100,000^{^}
United States (RIAA)	—	526,000
^{*} Sales figures based on certification alone.^{^} Shipments figures based on certification alone.

== Release history ==
Region	Date	Format	Label	Catalog #	Ref.
Japan	May 7, 2003	CD; SHM-CD; cassette; digital download	Universal Music Japan	UICS-9083	
Germany	May 12, 2003	CD; cassette; digital download	Nothing; Interscope	800065–6	
United Kingdom	May 12, 2003	CD; LP; cassette; digital download	Nothing; Interscope	800065–6	
North America	May 13, 2003	CD; digital download	Nothing; Interscope	9800080–9	
Australia	May 25, 2003	CD; cassette; digital download	Interscope	9800080–9	

== See also ==
- List of Billboard 200 number-one albums of 2003
- List of European number-one hits of 2003
- List of number-one albums of 2003 (Canada)
- List of number-one hits of 2003 (Italy)
