= Harry Cody (musician) =

Swedish musician (born 1962)

- Born: Harry Kemppainen; 13 October 1962 (age 64); Surahammar, Sweden
- Genre: Rock
- Occupations: Musician, composer
- Instrument: Guitar
- Years active: 1974–present
- Labels: CMM Records, Sweden; Relativity Records, USA
- Formerly of: Shotgun Messiah

Harry Cody (born 13 October 1962) is a Swedish songwriter, composer, and guitarist. He was a founding member of the glam metal and industrial band Shotgun Messiah, before joining Coma and founding Das Cabal. He has recorded with Tom Waits, among others.

Cody has composed scores for film and television commercials.

== Early life ==
Cody was born in Surahammar and moved to Skövde at age seven. He grew up influenced by a variety of rock and roll guitar players such as Chuck Berry, Scotty Moore (Elvis Presley), and Eddie Van Halen, among others. After finishing school, Cody worked for Volvo, and also served in the Swedish army. He quit his job to focus on music.

== Career ==
In 1983, Cody met Tim Skold, a bassist in Skövde, and they began playing together. Two years later, going by the name Harry K. Cody, he and Skold formed the band Kingpin, with Pekka "Stixx Galore" (later "Stixx") Ollinen (drums), and original singer J.K. Knox (Jukka Kemppainen). Cody played guitar on the band's album, Welcome To Bop City, which featured replacement singer, Easy Action's Zinny J. Zan. Cody's guitarwork earned him notice resulting in a feature in the "New Talent" column of Guitar Player magazine in 1986.

In 1987, he also performed a guest solo on Swedish guitarist Björn Stigsson’s solo album "Together with friends", on the track "Come Together", under the name Harry Kay.

"Welcome To Bop City" was released in Sweden by CMM Records in 1988, and yielded a No. 1 single in that country called "Shout It Out". Later, when released in the United States, the song went to the top half of the Billboard Album Chart.

Cody and Kingpin moved to the US in 1988, when they landed a record deal with Relativity Records.

Upon arrival in the US, Cody guested guitar on Stu Hamm's album, Kings of Sleep, but remained a part of Kingpin. The band's name was changed to Shotgun Messiah to avoid copyright issues with a San Francisco group of the same name. Welcome To Bop City was remixed for American release as Shotgun Messiah in September 1989.

Cody's guitar playing on the album included the song "The Explorer", called by Rolling Stone, "his showpiece instrumental". His work Shotgun Messiah garnered attention from peer publications such as Guitar Player, Musician, and Guitar magazines.

Cody toured North American with Shotgun Messiah to support the album.

In 1990, Cody dropped the K. from his professional name, and continued playing guitar with Shotgun Messiah even as the lineup changed. Skold became vocalist when Zinny J. Zan left the band, and American bassist Bobby Lycon joined for the recording of their next album, Second Coming. The band's most recognizable hit "Heartbreak Blvd" was culled from album of music that was a hybrid of metal, rap, pop, and classical. Cody's guitarwork was noted by the Chicago Sun-Times as "incendiary" on the project.

In 1991, Cody played guitar on bassist Stuart Hamm's album, The Urge.

Cody's next work with Shotgun Messiah was the EP I Want More, released in 1992. The EP included cover versions of songs by the Ramones, The Stooges, and the New York Dolls.

For the band's third album, Violent New Breed, Shotgun Messiah was just Cody and Skold. The duo went into a Swedish studio and recorded music that was a combination of industrial, techno, and hard rock influences. The album was released in 1993.

"It's a combination of our influences. We wanted this album to be a wall of noise. We sort of built it from the ground up, going into it with an open mind. I think we got a coherent, cohesive record."

Cody's guitar work on Violent New Breed was notably still high energy metal rock, but some of it was actually tracked backwards on the recording for some different sounds.

In 1993, Shotgun Messiah disbanded. A year later, Cody temporarily joined the band Coma along with Saigon Kick vocalist Matt Kramer, former King of the Hill guitarist Jimmy Griffin, and ex-Cryer drummer Ricky Sanders.

Cody completed his first soundtrack work in 1998, as part of the band Das Cabal. That band was formed with Rhino Bucket singer Georg Dolivo a couple of years prior. Das Cabal recorded the song "What Do you Want" for the film, Boogie Boy and its soundtrack.

Since 1998 and continuing into the new decade, Cody has been creating television commercial scores for Groove Addicts, based in Los Angeles.

Cody was recruited by Tom Waits to play guitar and banjo on Wait's Real Gone album, released in 2004. He also performed on Waits' "Orphans" Brawlers, Bawlers & Bastards boxset compilation that came out in 2006.

In 2005, Cody composed the score for the Larry Clark film Wassup Rockers.

Cody played the banjo on the song "You Can Never Hold Back Spring", the opening song by Tom Waits on the 2006 soundtrack for the Roberto Benigni film Tiger and the Snow.

In 2007 Cody contributed guitar work to the film Highlander: The Search for Vengeance.
