= Zinny J. Zan =

Swedish rock singer (born 1964)

- Also known as: Bosse Belsen
- Born: Bo Stagman; 18 January 1964 (age 62)
- Origin: Stockholm, Sweden
- Genres: Hard rock
- Occupation: Singer
- Years active: 1981–present
- Member of: Zan Clan, Easy Action
- Formerly of: Shotgun Messiah, Belsen Boys, Alarm X, Brilliant Boys, Bangshot, Dream Police, Grand Slam

Zinny J. Zan (born Bo Stagman on 18 January 1964 and earlier known as Bosse Belsen) is a Swedish rock singer who is the former lead singer for Shotgun Messiah and the founder and frontman for Zan Clan and Easy Action.

== Musical career ==
Zinny J. Zan is probably best known internationally as the original lead singer for the 1980s glam metal band Shotgun Messiah (1985–90). However, he was already well known in his native Sweden by the time he was 18, when his band Easy Action (1981–85) toured Scandinavia and soon thereafter signed a contract with Warner Bros. Records. Easy Action was the first Swedish music artist ever to sign a worldwide deal.

His music career started earlier when he played drums in band such as Belsen Boys, Alarm X and Beauty Box. He was also singer in Brilliant Boys.

Zinny's work with Easy Action included one album as well as a Swedish slasher movie titled Blood Tracks, which Easy Action both provided the music for and starred in.

After a few years of enjoying local success touring the Scandinavia region, Zinny wanted the band to try to make a go of it in the U.S., while the other members of the band were hesitant to leave their home country. These conflicting views eventually prompted Zinny to leave Sweden for New York and start looking for a new band.

He was soon contacted by fellow Swedes Tim Sköld and Harry Cody and asked to join their band Kingpin (the band that would eventually become Shotgun Messiah), which also featured drummer Stixx Galore. While still performing under the name Kingpin, the band recorded the album Welcome to Bop City. After being signed to Relativity Records and relocating to Hollywood, California, they changed their name to Shotgun Messiah and remixed and released the Bop City album as Shotgun Messiah's self-titled debut album.

The album Shotgun Messiah was a moderate success, spawning three fairly popular singles as well as two music videos for MTV and reaching #52 on the American Billboard chart. Eventually though, personality and creative differences between Harry, Tim and Zinny began to grow and led to Zinny's departure from Shotgun Messiah in 1990.

After the split, Zinny went back to Stockholm to recalibrate, but due to various personal problems (a divorce, the death of his father, his sister's cancer diagnosis, and his own battle with a stomach disease), it would be over four years before the eventual 1994 release of the album Citizen of Wasteland, credited to his new band Zan Clan. The album saw rather limited success.

In 2002, Zinny would record and release the solo album City Boy Blues which enjoyed moderate commercial and critical success in Scandinavia and earned distinction as the "Comeback Album of the Year" in the UK´s Classic Rock Magazine but failed to garner much attention in the U.S.

Zinny then signed a TV contract to be the Tour Manager and Mentor for a band called Tribal Ink for the TV show Wannabe in 2002.

Shortly thereafter, Zinny would resurrect the Zan Clan with a new line up including producer/guitarist/songwriter friend Chris Laney. In 2005, the Zan Clan released the album We Are Zan Clan, Who The Fuck Are You in addition to opening a series of shows in Europe for Whitesnake and Queensrÿche.

=== Easy Action reunion ===
In 2006, Zinny reunited with his former Easy Action bandmate, guitarist Kee Marcello (who had served a stint in the band Europe in the interim) for a Reunion gig at Sweden Rock Festival. This performance led to more shows for Easy Action, including serving as the opening act for Twisted Sister on their farewell tour in 2007.

In 2008, Easy Action released a new single "Jack's Back" (Produced by Chris Laney) and opened up The Speedway Grand Prix at Ullevi in Gothenburg. This tune remained on the singles chart in Sweden for weeks.

At one point later in the 2000s, it was reported that Zinny and Easy Action were finishing up the recording of their new album, which had the working title of Looking Up Your Old Address. However, in 2013, it was revealed that the Looking Up Your Old Address album would not be released, as Easy Action had split up once again, with Kee and Zinny parting ways.

== Influences and tributes ==
Zinny was heavily influenced by such bands as Aerosmith, Kiss, Sex Pistols, and Thin Lizzy, inspirations which are reflected in his songwriting and singing style.

In addition to his work with numerous bands, he has also performed on several tribute albums. He contributed to the FastLane Records release Tricked Out, a tribute to Cheap Trick, where he performed the CT hit "Surrender." He later also contributed a cover version of the Thin Lizzy song "Dedication" to the A Tribute to Phil Lynott album.

== Recent years ==
Zinny is reportedly in the process of writing an autobiography titled The Lies and Faults of Zinny J. Zan which will reveal everything, from groupies to "behind-the-scenes" content within his bands and the record industry.

On 19 April 2013, Zinny released the single "The Perfect Age of Rock n Roll," which also appears on the soundtrack for the American movie of the same name starring Peter Fonda.

Later in 2013, Zinny also put together the band Shotgun, an idea proposed by his old musical partner, Chris Laney, and Rob Marcello (not to be confused with his former Easy Action bandmate, Kee Marcello) in commemoration of the upcoming 25th anniversary of Shotgun Messiah's highly acclaimed debut album. Pekka "Stixx" Ollinen, original drummer in Shotgun Messiah also came on board for this celebration tour, which included stints at The Club in STHLM; Sticky Fingers in GTB; and a number of Festivals such as Grebbestad Festival, Skogsröjet, and the grand finale at Väsby Rock Festival. In 2014, Zinny became a member of the Väsby Rock Festival Management, making the festival a two-day event, as opposed to its previous one-day duration.

In 2017, Zinny released his first-ever solo album in his native language, Swedish, under his birthname, Stagman. The album, titled Är Ni Kvar Därute? ("Are You Still Out There?"), features former Easy Action 2006 bandmates, drummer – and in this case also producer – Björn Höglund and guitarist Simon Roxx, along with a few other great musicians such as Martin Sweet (Crash Diet) and Nalle Påhlsson (Treat, Therion) to name a few.

== Personal life ==
Zinny is a father of two children: a daughter Yasmine and a son Zack (born 2009), the latter of whose mother is Zinny's fiancée for the last 14 years, Beatrice.

== Discography ==
=== Easy Action ===
- Easy Action (1983) – vocals
- "We Go Rocking [New 2008 version]" / "Jack's Back" (single, Official Speedway Grand Prix Anthem 2008)

=== Kingpin ===
- Welcome To Bop City (1988) – vocals

=== Shotgun Messiah ===
- Shotgun Messiah (1989) – vocals

=== Zinny J. Zan ===
- City Boy Blues (2002) – vocals
- Lullabies for the Masses (2022) – vocals

=== Zinny Zan ===
- "The Perfect Age of Rock 'n Roll" (single) (2013) The Perfect Age of Rock n Roll, movie soundtrack

=== Zan Clan ===
- Citizen of Wasteland (1994) – vocals
- We Are Zan Clan, Who the Fuck Are You (2005) – vocals
- Kickz the Livin' Shit... Outta Stockholm City – live album recorded at Klubben STHLM (2006)

=== Stagman ===
- Är Ni Kvar Därute? (Are You Still Out There? - album in Swedish) (2017) – vocals

== See also ==
- Tim Sköld
- Harry K. Cody
- Easy Action (band)
- Shotgun Messiah
