= Citizen of Wasteland =

Studio album by Zan Clan
- Released: 1994
- Genre: Glam
- Label: SMC

Zan Clan chronology
Citizen of Wasteland (1994)	We Are Zan Clan, Who the Fuck Are You (2005)

Citizen of Wasteland is the first studio album by Zan Clan, a Swedish glam band. It was released in 1994 by SMC Records. The Zan Clan featured Zinny J. Zan on vocals, Perra Tedeblad on bass, Soren L. Swanson and Christian Baraldi on guitar, and Matthew Baraldi on drums.

== Track listing ==
1. "Zan Clan Stomp" (0:30)
2. "Call of the Wild" (04:26)
3. "Youngblood" (04:50)
4. "Russian Roulette" (04:49)
5. "I Want It All" (04:50)
6. "After the Fire" (06:20)
7. "Citizen of Wa steland" (05:27)
8. "Times Out" (04:05)
9. "Private Hell" (04:29)
10. "Drop in the Bucket" (04:14)
11. "Prelude" (01:25)
12. "Shine" (04:57)
13. "Monkeyhouse" (05:39)
14. "Naggin Bitch" (01:11)

== See also ==
- Band home page
