= Finding Neverland =

Finding Neverland may refer to:

- Eden Eternal (also Finding Neverland Online), a free-to-play anime-styled massively multiplayer online role-playing game
- Finding Neverland (film), a 2004 historical fantasy drama film directed by Marc Forster and written by David Magee
- Finding Neverland (musical), a musical with music and lyrics by Gary Barlow and Eliot Kennedy and a book by James Graham
- Finding Neverland (soundtrack), the original soundtrack album of the 2004 film Finding Neverland
