= Mobscene =

Single by Marilyn Manson

from the album The Golden Age of Grotesque
- Released: April 2003
- Genre: Industrial metal; nu metal; glam punk
- Length: 3:25
- Label: Nothing; Interscope
- Songwriters: John 5; Marilyn Manson
- Producers: Marilyn Manson; Tim Sköld

Marilyn Manson singles chronology
"Tainted Love" (2001)	"Mobscene" (2003)	"This Is the New Shit" (2003)

Audio sample
- "Mobscene": file; help

"Mobscene" (stylized as "mOBSCENE") is a song by American rock band Marilyn Manson. It was released in April 2003 as the lead single from their fifth studio album, The Golden Age of Grotesque (2003). The song was nominated for a Grammy Award for Best Metal Performance, but lost out to Metallica's "St. Anger". As of 2020, the song sold around 50,000 copies in the United Kingdom, where it has also been streamed almost 4 million times. In the US, the song reached number 18 on the Billboard Mainstream Rock Tracks and number 26 on the Billboard Modern Rock Tracks chart.

== Composition ==
Manson has said that "Mobscene" was "pulled from the weirdest parts of my imagination." Prior to writing the song, Manson had seen several Busby Berkeley films with all-female chorus lines. He then met with his band and told them that he wanted to create a song that evoked Berkeley's films, the writings of Oscar Wilde, and an elephant stampede.

== Critical reception ==
In PopMatters, Lance Teegarden deemed "Mobscene" the best track on the band's greatest hits album Lest We Forget: The Best Of (2004), writing "Here Manson finds the little bit of irreverence he is looking for." Teegarden praised Sköld's production. BuzzFeed's Richard James opined that the song "proves nu metal is the greatest gift to music ever".

== Track listings ==
- International CD single
1. "Mobscene"
2. "Tainted Love" (Re-Tainted Interpretation)
3. "Mobscene" (Rammstein's Sauerkraut Remix)
4. "Paranoiac"
- US CD single
1. "Mobscene"
2. "Paranoiac"
- Uk CD single
1. "Mobscene (Album Version)
2. "Tainted Love (Re-Tainted Interpretation)
3. "Mobscene (Overnight Mix)
4. "Mobscene (Video)
- UK DVD Single
1. "Mobscene (Album Version)
2. "Exclusive interview Footage
3. "Marilyn Manson's Short Documentary Clips
- Europe Promo CD (Remixes) and 12"Maxi Single (Remixes)
1. "Mobscene (Overnight Mix)-Reworked By Flint & Youth
2. "Mobscene (Rammstein Sauerkraut Remix)
- 7" Blue Vinyl
1. "Mobscene
2. "Paranoiac
- European Cardboard Sleeve CD Single
1. "Mobscene
2. "Tainted Love (Re-Tainted Interpretation)

== Charts ==
Chart (2003)	Peak position
Australia (ARIA)	31
Austria (Ö3 Austria Top 40)	15
Belgium (Ultratip Bubbling Under Flanders)	8
Belgium (Ultratop 50 Wallonia)	38
Canada (Nielsen SoundScan)	4
Denmark (Tracklisten)	7
Europe (Eurochart Hot 100)	28
Finland (Suomen virallinen lista)	16
France (SNEP)	61
Germany (GfK)	20
Hungary (Single Top 40)	6
Ireland (IRMA)	27
Italy (FIMI)	9
Netherlands (Single Top 100)	84
New Zealand (Recorded Music NZ)	32
Norway (VG-lista)	20
Portugal (Billboard)	1
Spain (Promusicae)	10
Sweden (Sverigetopplistan)	18
Switzerland (Schweizer Hitparade)	6
UK Singles (OCC)	13
US Alternative Airplay (Billboard)	26
US Mainstream Rock (Billboard)	18
