= Second Coming (Shotgun Messiah album) =

Studio album by Shotgun Messiah
- Released: 22 October 1991
- Recorded: Fortress Studios
- Genres: Glam metal, heavy metal, hard rock
- Length: 56:53
- Label: Relativity
- Producers: Pat Regan, Harry Cody, Tim Sköld

Shotgun Messiah chronology
Shotgun Messiah (1989)	Second Coming (1991)	Violent New Breed (1993)

Singles from Second Coming
- 1. "Red Hot" Released: 1991; 2. "Heartbreak Blvd" Released: 1991; 3. "Living Without You" Released: 1992

Professional ratings
Review scores
Source	Rating
AllMusic	3/5 stars

Second Coming is the second album by Swedish hard rock band Shotgun Messiah, released on 22 October 1991 through Relativity Records. The album featured the hit single "Heartbreak Blvd", while also seeing the band's musical style evolve into a hybrid of metal, rap, pop and classical. Second Coming would go on to sell almost 150.000 copies.

== Track listing ==
All tracks are written by Tim Skold and Harry Cody, except where noted.

No.	Title	Writer(s)	Length
1.	"Sex Drugs Rock 'n' Roll"		3:25
2.	"Red Hot"		4:23
3.	"Nobody's Home"		4:44
4.	"Living Without You"		4:07
5.	"Heartbreak Blvd"		4:18
6.	"I Want More"	Cody	6:10
7.	"Trouble"		4:36
8.	"Ride the Storm"		3:59
9.	"I Wanna Know"	Skold	4:46
10.	"Babylon (New York Dolls Cover)"	David Johansen, Johnny Thunders	2:57
11.	"Free"	Cody	5:13
12.	"You & Me"	Cody	4:15
13.	"Can't Fool Me"	Skold	4:00
Total length:			56:53

== Personnel ==
- Tim Skold – Vocals
- Harry Cody – Guitars
- Bobby Lycon – Bass
- Stixx Galore – Drums
- Pat Regan – "Silly percussion" on "I Wanna Know"

Notes: Stixx Galore is credited as drummer - although he was still a member of the band, the drums on Second Coming is a mix between programmed and triggered drums. To add some "realism" to the programmed drums, Galore played the cymbals in the studio recording sessions.
