= This Is the New Shit =

Single by Marilyn Manson

from the album The Golden Age of Grotesque
- Released: September 1, 2003 (UK)
- Genre: Nu metal
- Length: 4:20
- Label: Nothing; Interscope
- Songwriters: Brian Hugh Warner; John William Lowery; Tim Sköld
- Producers: Marilyn Manson; Tim Skold

Marilyn Manson singles chronology
"Mobscene" (2003)	"This Is the New Shit" (2003)	"Personal Jesus" (2004)

Audio sample
- "This Is the New Shit": file; help

Music video
- “This Is the New Shit” on YouTube

"This Is the New Shit" is a song by American rock band Marilyn Manson, written by Marilyn Manson, John 5 and Tim Sköld, produced by Manson and Sköld. It is the second track on and second single from the band's fifth studio album, The Golden Age of Grotesque, following "mOBSCENE", and had the most success.

The UK release includes a Goldfrapp remix and a cover of the Geto Boys' "Mind of a Lunatic". In 2015, Canadian DJ and record producer Rezz released a remix.

In the music video, the word "shit" is replaced with "hit".

== Background ==
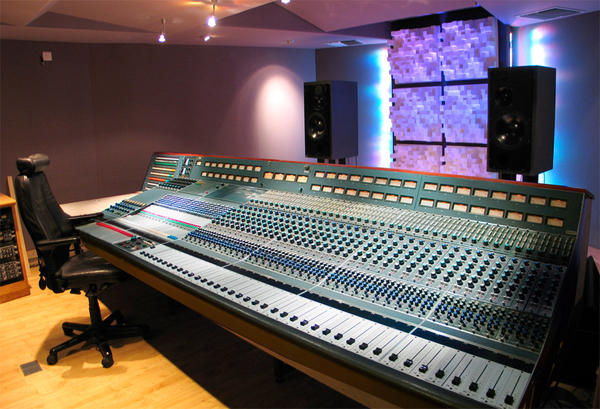
Manson created the song's riff with a Neve console.

The first track written for The Golden Age of the Grotesque, "This Is the New Shit" was inspired by Manson's fascination with the rhythms and beats of hip hop music and how "it brings out something that so many people like". He created the song's instrumentation before writing its lyrics: "It was worth trying to focus on making the beats first, and really making beats that had their own hooks to them, and then making riffs." To create the song's riff, he played a guitar into a Neve console. Manson told Jim Louvau of the Phoenix New Times that after creating the song's beat, "Then I wanted to address the simple absurdity of saying 'This Is the New Shit'--it's the most bitter, sardonic stab at fucking anyone who would listen to the song unless you get that, and therein lies the beauty." Manson also said that the track was inspired by Dadaism and is about "when you get to a point in history or in art or in your own creativity where you throw your hands up and you say 'I've done everything. Where do I go from here?'"

== Critical reception ==
Jim Louvau of the Phoenix New Times called "This Is the New Shit" a "great track" and one of his favorite Marilyn Manson songs, alongside "Little Horn" from 1996's Antichrist Superstar. Exclaim!'s Liisa Ladouceur said that the track is "ripping" and one of the band's best. Rolling Stone's Barry Walters said that the track "sounds a whole lot like the old shit....What's surprising is that there's still so much life in what Manson is rehashing." He deemed the song and "Mobscene" "simultaneously fresh and putrid." Joseph Schafer of Stereogum found "This Is the New Shit" "anthemic" but did not include it on his list of "The 10 Best Marilyn Manson Songs", as Manson "was at his best when trying to both look and sound like an evil David Bowie."

== In popular culture ==
This song was featured in an episode of CSI: Crime Scene Investigation titled "Suckers". It was also included on the soundtrack for the film, The Matrix Reloaded, and used in the film, Hatchet. It was used in a series 8 episode of Waterloo Road, and several trailers for BioWare's 2009 RPG Dragon Age: Origins.

Between July 10 and August 7, 2007, the radio edit was used as the theme song for the WWE's ECW brand. It replaced the long-standing theme, "Bodies" by Drowning Pool, and was replaced by "This Is Extreme!" by Harry Slash & The Slashtones and "Don't Question My Heart"—an in house written track—the two times it was replaced.

== Track listing ==
UK:

1. "This Is the New Shit" (album version)
2. "This Is the New Shit (Goldfrapp remix)"
3. "Mind of a Lunatic"
4. "This Is the New Hit" (video)

EU:

1. "This Is the New Shit" (album version)
2. "This Is the New Shit (Goldfrapp remix)"
3. "Baboon Rape Party"
4. "mOBSCENE" (video)

== Charts ==
Chart (2003)	Peak position
Australia (ARIA)	31
Austria (Ö3 Austria Top 40)	24
Belgium (Ultratip Bubbling Under Wallonia)	15
France (SNEP)	95
Europe (Eurochart Hot 100)	38
Germany (GfK)	25
Italy (FIMI)	41
Uruguay (Notimex)	1
Spain (Promusicae)	15
Scotland Singles (Official Charts)	30
Sweden (Sverigetopplistan)	59
Switzerland (Schweizer Hitparade)	44
UK Singles Chart	29

== Music video ==
The music video was recorded in the Cinquantenaire, under the arcade and by the huge glass of Gédéon Bordiau.

== Certifications ==
Certifications for "This Is the New Shit"
Region	Certification	Certified units/sales
New Zealand (RMNZ)	Gold	15,000^{‡}
^{‡} Sales+streaming figures based on certification alone.
