= Jeff Harding (actor) =

American actor

Jeff Harding is an American actor from Andover, Massachusetts, who attended college in Brunswick, Maine.

He is best known as an audiobook narrator for works including the Jack Reacher book series for Audible, The Da Vinci Code, The Bourne Identity, Kane and Abel and Secrets Of The Code. He also narrates for the RNIB Talking Books service.

As an actor, he has appeared in films like The Razor's Edge (1984), Spies Like Us (1985), Hackers (1995), Tomorrow Never Dies (1997), Alfie (2004) and De-Lovely (2004).

A resident of the United Kingdom since the 1970s, Harding has appeared in British & Irish comedy series like The Armando Iannucci Shows, The Fast Show and (as Fr Buzz Cagney) Father Ted and in the 1980s BBC drama series Howards' Way. On The Fast Show, Harding's sketches often involved nothing more than his character saying "Hi, I'm Ed Winchester" to the camera in the style of a TV news reporter. He also appeared in the 1990s remake of The Tomorrow People as General Damon. He dubbed Felidae in 1994.

In the BBC docudrama series Seven Wonders of the Industrial World he played chief engineer John Frank Stevens in the episode dedicated to the building of the Panama Canal.

He guest-starred in the CW series Life is Wild in the episode "Open for Business". He voices Vincent Meis in the video game The Witcher and guest-starred in the CBBC series The Basil Brush Show in 2003 in the episode Fit for Nothing, playing Healthy Harry. In the 1990s he provided voice-overs for many Dorling Kindersley CD-ROMs.

Before his film and television work, Harding taught in Morocco and later became a master carpenter at the Palace Theatre in London's West End.

== Partial filmography ==
- Rupan sansei (1978) – Flinch (1996 Manga dub) (English version, voice, uncredited)
- Ragtime (1981) – Policeman No. 13
- Space Riders (1984) – Mike Lockwood
- Scream for Help (1984) – Policeman #4
- The Razor's Edge (1984) – Brian Ryan
- The Dirty Dozen: Next Mission (1985, TV Movie) – Sanders
- The Aviator (1985) – Carson
- Blood Tracks (1985) – John
- Spies Like Us (1985) – Fitz-Hume's Associate
- The American Way (1986) – Doug
- The Last Days of Patton (1986, TV movie) – West Point Professor
- Love Potion (1987) – Gerald
- A Time of Destiny (1988) – Sergeant
- Howards' Way (1988–89, TV series) – Orrin Hudson
- Patlabor: The Movie (1989) – Pilot (1995) (English version, voice, uncredited)
- Murder Story (1989) – Larry Deleo
- Angel Cop (1989-1994) - Raiden (English version, voice, credited as John Hunter)
- Bullseye! (1990) – Agent Merrow
- The Runner (1992) – Radio Announcer
- The Fast Show (1994, TV series) – Ed Winchester
- Felidae - Francis (English version, voice)
- Hackers (1995) – 2nd V.P.
- Ekkusu (1996) – Kusangi Shiyuu (English version, voice)
- Tomorrow Never Dies (1997) – Newsreader (uncredited)
- RPM (1998) – Tim Ryan
- The Misadventures of Margaret (1998) – Man at Party
- De-Lovely (2004) – Cody
- Alfie (2004) – Phil
- The White Countess (2005) – Company Director
- The Battersea Ripper (2006)
- Alien Autopsy (2006) – CIA Agent
- The Kovak Box (2006) – Gerente Sanatorio
