= The Ninja Mission =

- Theatrical release poster
- Directed by: Mats Helge
- Written by: Matthew Jacobs
- Produced by: Mats Helge
- Starring: Krzysztof Kolberger; Hanna Bieniuszewicz; Bo Munthe; Curt Broberg; Sven-Eric Bogsäter
- Cinematography: Peter Stevenson
- Music by: Dag Unenge
- Production companies: VTC; World Film Alliance
- Release date: 1984
- Running time: 93 min.
- Country: Sweden
- Language: English
- Box office: Reportedly over 250 million SEK

The Ninja Mission is a 1984 Swedish action film directed by Mats Helge, starring the Polish actors Krzysztof Kolberger and Hanna Bieniuszewicz. All other roles are played by largely unknown Swedish and British actors.

== Plot summary ==
The story revolves around a Swedish scientist named Karl Markov working in the Soviet Union and his latest invention, an advanced nuclear fission control system which he wants to gift to the entire world. When the Russians intend to monopolize his invention, Markov decides to defect back to the West, but is held prisoner by the KGB. In order to force his cooperation, the KGB plots to kidnap his estranged daughter Nadia. However, the CIA has foreseen this eventuality and assigned Mason, one of their agents, and his team of ninjas to protect her and reunite her with her father upon his covert extraction.

After foiling a KGB attempt to kidnap Nadia, Mason explains his mission and her importance in it to her, but Nadia remains skeptical. The KGB agents track her down and succeed in their second attempt in spite of Mason's intervention. At the same time, the CIA tries to liberate Markov, but the agents are killed by Markov's assistant Natassia, who really works for the KGB, and under the pretense that he is taken to Sweden, Markov is instead transported to a castle near Kotlas, Russia, where he is placed under the supervision of an American traitor named Ableman. Markov has hidden the formula for his invention within the text of a romance novel, with only him knowing the method of how to decode it.

Nadia is taken to the fortress and is reunited with her father, and with her presence Markov starts completing his formula, unaware that he is marked for liquidation once he is finished. Mason's boss Daniels sends him and his ninjas to Russia to extract the Markovs, accompanied by sleeper agent Mikail Butkovsky and equipped with high-tech commando weaponry. After the team infiltrates the castle, Mason approaches Markov and reveals the Soviets' deception before he is detected and captured. Markov refuses to complete his work, but is forced to relent when Ableman orders Nadia to be tortured.

Mason is freed by his team, but before they can reach Markov, the professor is killed during a rash attempt to wrest a gun from Natassia. Taking Nadia and the completed printouts with them, they set explosive charges and fight their way out of the compound. Ableman takes up the chase, which ends in a massive firefight at a roadblock near the Swedish border, in which course all but Mason and Nadia are killed. Surprisingly, Daniels shows up, and it is revealed that Ableman has cut a deal with him: Markov's formula for his return to the United States. Angered at the duplicity, Mason pretends to tear up the formula, whereupon Daniels fires him and leaves in disgust. Once he is gone, Mason gives the real papers to Nadia, who burns them.

== Cast ==
- Krzysztof Kolberger (credited as Christofer Kohlberg) as Mason
- Hanna Bieniuszewicz (Hanna Pola) as Nadia
- Bo Munthe (Bo F. Munthe) as Hansen
- Curt Broberg (Curt Brober) as Professor Markov
- Hans Rosteen as Ableman
- John Quantz (John Quantz von Ills) as Johnny
- Sirka Sander as Natassia Kayensky
- Mark Davies as Mikhail "Mike" Butkovsky
- Wolff Lindner (Wolf Linder) as Daniels
- Mats Helge Olsson (Mats Helge) as Ivan
- Leo Adolfsson as Brett
- Brett Barber as Tom

== Production ==
Bo F. Munthe claimed that Charles Aperia got the idea for the film after he saw a brief draft for a novel Munthe he was working on, entitled Ninja-mördare i svart (Ninja Assassin in Black).

Filming took place in Stockholm (Havregatan), Lidköpings city hospital and harbour (with the former acting as the Leningrad institute), as well as the Halden fortress in Norway (acting as the fake UN building used by the KGB).

== Reception ==
Although the film had a very modest release in its native Sweden, The Ninja Mission did well on the foreign market. It was released in 54 countries and achieved cult status in many Asian countries.

== Releases ==
For many years, there were no any legitimate DVD or Blu-ray release of the movie, due to objections by Mats Helge. An underground DVD edition was however made available on Swedish markets by the distributor Horsecreek Entertainment, whose CEO Charles Aperia also served as the film's producer. The DVD edition is uncut and features dubbed English audio with optional Swedish subtitles.

In 2025, the film was scanned and digitally restored in 4K using the original camera negative as its source. The restoration is uncut and shown in its original aspect ratio of CinemaScope for the first time since its theatrical run whereas all earlier home video releases are in pan and scan. A Blu-Ray was released in Sweden by Studio S Entertainment in November 2025, containing both the restored version of the film and deleted scenes as special features.

== Sources ==
- Regissören som försvann - Historien om The Ninja Mission, SVT, 13 September 2013. (Youtube video link)
- Tommy Gustaffson and Pietari Kääpä (eds.). Nordic Genre Film: Small Nation Film Cultures in the Global Marketplace. Edinburgh University Press, 2015. ISBN 0-74869-318-1.
- Mrozewicz, Anna Estera. Beyond Eastern Noir: Reimagining Russia and Eastern Europe in Nordic Cinemas. Edinburgh University Press, 2018. ISBN 1-47445-226-4.
