= Welcome to Bop City =

Studio album by Kingpin
- Released: 1988
- Studio: CMM Studios, KMH Studios
- Genre: Glam metal, hard rock
- Length: 39:27
- Label: CMM
- Producer: Matt J. Olausson

Welcome to Bop City is the first album from Swedish glam metal / hard rock band Kingpin, released in 1988 on the CMM (Club Mariann Music) label in Sweden and in 1989 on the Music For Nations label in the UK. The album was later remixed and released in 1989 under the band's new name Shotgun Messiah on Relativity Records in the US, charting respectably at #99 on Billboard and selling close to half a million copies.

It is the band's only album with Easy Action / Zan Clan singer Zinny J. Zan on vocals, who joined after hearing the band's early demos.

== Track listing ==
1. "Bop City" - 4:06
2. "Shout It Out" - 4:16
3. "I Don't Care 'Bout Nothin'" - 4:29
4. "Squeezin' Teazin'" - 3:58
5. "The Explorer" (instrumental) - 4:02
6. "Nowhere Fast" - 4:29
7. "I'm Your Love" - 5:00
8. "Dirt Talk" - 4:36
9. "Nervous"- 4:27

== Personnel ==
- Zinny J. Zan - Vocals
- Harry Cody - Guitars
- Tim Tim (Tim Sköld) - Bass
- Stixx Galore - Drums
- Tord Jacobsson - Drums (on "The Explorer")
