= Never Ever =

Never Ever may refer to:

== Music ==
=== EPs ===
- Never Ever (Jiyeon EP), 2014
- Never Ever (Weep EP), 2008

=== Songs ===
- "Never Ever" (All Saints song), 1997
- "Never Ever" (Ayumi Hamasaki song), 2001
- "Never Ever" (Ciara song), 2009
- "Never Ever" (Got7 song), 2017
- "Never Ever" (The Rubens song), featuring Sarah Aarons, 2018
- "Never Ever", song by Caro Emerald from the 2017 EP Emerald Island
- "Never Ever", song by Meghan Trainor from the 2011 album Only 17

== Films ==
- Never Ever (1996 film), a 1996 film by director Charles Finch
- Never Ever (2016 film), a 2016 film by Benoît Jacquot
- Never Ever, a fictional place in 2024 horror film Imaginary

== See also ==
- "Neva Eva", 2003 song by Trillville
- Never Never (disambiguation)
