= Easy Action (Easy Action album) =

Studio album by Easy Action
- Released: 1983
- Genre: Glam rock
- Length: 34:27
- Label: Tandan Records

Easy Action chronology
Easy Action (1983)	That Makes One (1986)

1984 edition album cover

Professional ratings
Review scores
Source	Rating
Kerrang!	4/5 stars

Easy Action is the first album of the Swedish glam rock band Easy Action. The band got signed to a Swedish indie label, Tandan Records, and released their first album in the Scandinavian countries in 1983. The label owner Sanji Tandan later became the band's manager and got them signed to the Warner Bros label Sire, and in 1984 a second version of the album, with two new songs, was released worldwide. Easy Action was the first Swedish band ever to sign a US major label deal.

== Track listing ==
All tracks written by Marcello, Tyrone (Thyrén) and Zan except where indicated

=== Side One ===
1. "Rocket Ride" - 3:37
2. "Mental Dance" - 3:56
3. "The End of the Line" (Marcello, Zan) - 3:19
4. "Don't Cry, Don't Crack" - 3:22
5. "Another Saturday Night" - 3:11

=== Side Two ===
6. "We Go Rocking" - 3:52
7. "Let's Lose Control" (Marcello) - 3:18
8. "Rock Things Out" - 3:13
9. "Number One" - 3:14
10. "Turn Me On" - 3:25

=== 1984 edition bonus tracks ===
1. "Round Round Round" - 2:59
2. "Rock On Rollers" - 3:56

"Rock On Rollers" replaced "Turn Me On" in the 1984 edition

=== 2008 CD remastered edition bonus tracks ===
11. "Rock On Rockers" - 3:56
12. "Round Round Round" - 2:59
13. "Drop the Bomb" (live) - 3:04
14. "In the Middle of Nowhere" - 2:29
15. "Roll Baby Roll" - 4:11
16. "The End of the Line '84" (Marcello, Zan) - 3:37
17. "Round Round Round" (live) - 4:02
18. "Don't Cry, Don't Crack" (live) - 3:49
19. "Number One" (live) - 3:55
20. "We Go Rocking" - 4:24
21. "Sweet Sangria" - 4:13

=== Reptilian Records Tracks ===
1. "What's The Deal"
2. "You And Me"
3. "Twenty-One"
4. "Do Or Die"
5. "All Of The Time"
6. "Do It Cuz I Can"
7. "Out Cold"
8. "Can't Kill You"
9. "Nowhere"
10. "If There Is Something"

== Personnel ==
=== Band members ===
- Zinny J. Zan - lead and backing vocals
- Kee Marcello - lead guitar, keyboards, harmonica, backing vocals
- Danny Wilde - rhythm guitar, backing vocals
- Alex Tyrone (Peo Thyrén) - bass, backing vocals
- Fredrik Von Gerber - drums, backing vocals

=== Additional musicians ===
- Chris Lind - rhythm guitar on tracks 11, 12, 14, 16

=== Production ===
- Ollie Larsson - engineer, mixing
- Bo Larsson - mixing on tracks 4, 10
