= Mats Helge =

Swedish independent filmmaker

Mats Helge, stage name of Mats-Helge Olsson (born 10 May 1953) is a Swedish independent filmmaker, best known for movies such as The Ninja Mission (1984), and he is one of the most productive independent Swedish directors ever, with almost 100 titles to his résumé. He began his career with movies in the 1970s with movies the press called "lingonwesterns".

He also directed I Död mans spår (1975), with Carl-Gustaf Lindstedt and a couple of six-shooters, shot in High Chaparral in Småland, Sweden. Then he made Tvingad att leva (1980) with Per Oscarsson in Lidköping, and The Ninja Mission (1984), his most famous and successful film.

Then he went on to make a few movies with the American actor David Carradine, and action-movies like Blood Tracks, Eagle Island, Spökligan, SilverHawk, The Hired Gun, Animal Protector, The Forgotten Wells, The Mad Bunch, Fatal Secret, The Russian Terminator, Babysitter and the short-lived Robert Aschberg-series Nordexpressen. Due to the early 1990s recession and royalties from The Ninja Mission not reaching Mats Helge and his production company he ceased making films in the mid 90's. Several of the people that worked in his studio were absorbed into the main stream Swedish film industry, most notably Anders Nilsson, director of Zero Tolerance.

Mats Helge has since the 90's worked as a logistical advisor on foreign film productions and runs a film school. Only five of his films: The Ninja Mission, Bloodtracks, Animal Protector, The Mad Bunch and Fatal Secret are officially available on DVD in Sweden, through Njutafilms. Other releases of his films on DVD have been noted by media outlets as unauthorized with Mats Helge not being paid royalties.
