= Doctor Midnight & The Mercy Cult =

Scandinavian metal band

- Also known as: DMTMC
- Genre: Alternative metal
- Years active: 2009–2011
- Label: Season of Mist
- Past members: Hank von Helvete; Tim Sköld; Anders Odden; Audun Stengel; David Husvik

Doctor Midnight & The Mercy Cult (DMTMC) was a Scandinavian heavy metal supergroup formed in 2009. The band consisted of former-Turbonegro vocalist Hank von Helvete, former-Marilyn Manson and KMFDM multi-instrumentalist Tim Sköld, guitarists Anders Odden of Cadaver and Satyricon, and Audun Stengel of Apoptygma Berzerk and The Kovenant, and former-Extol drummer David Husvik. The band released their only album, I Declare: Treason in 2011 through Season of Mist and disbanded later that year.

== History ==
Doctor Midnight & The Mercy Cult was formed in 2009 and recorded their debut album in Oslo, Stockholm and Los Angeles. The band signed with record label Season of Mist in January 2011 and released their debut single, "(Don't) Waste It", on 9 May. DMTMC made their live debut on May 11 in Helsinki, followed by shows in Oslo and Stockholm. Their debut album, I Declare: Treason, was released on 6 June to mixed reviews. The band played several festivals in Scandinavia in support of the album before disbanding later in 2011.

== Members ==
- Hank von Helvete – vocals
- Tim Sköld – bass
- Anders Odden – guitars
- Audun Stengel – guitars
- David Husvik – drums

== Discography ==
Studio albums

- I Declare: Treason (2011)
