= Skold =

Studio album by Tim Skold
- Released: July 29, 1996
- Genre: Industrial rock
- Length: 42:25
- Label: RCA
- Producer: Scott Humphrey and Skold

Tim Skold chronology
Skold (1996)	Neverland (1996)

Promotional cover

Skold is the debut solo album by Tim Skold, released in 1996. Following the break-up of his former band Shotgun Messiah in 1993, Skold began working on a solo album, writing and performing all the songs by himself. He briefly toured with a live band in support of the album together with the Genitorturers, before joining KMFDM in 1997.

The song "Chaos" was used in the video game Twisted Metal 4 and the film Universal Soldier: The Return, while the song "Hail Mary" was featured on the Disturbing Behavior soundtrack.

== Reception ==
Alan Escher of Allmusic suggested that the album's lyrics may be "trying to tap into the incredibly dark overtones" used by Nine Inch Nails' Trent Reznor, but that the music "is almost always interesting, and [Skold] knows how to rock". He concluded that the album is good, although not "groundbreaking".

== Track listing ==
All songs written by Tim Skold.

No.	Title	Length
1.	"Chaos"	4:14
2.	"Remember"	4:58
3.	"P.A.M.F."	3:29
4.	"Neverland"	4:38
5.	"Void"	4:17
6.	"Dust to Dust"	3:54
7.	"Anything"	4:07
8.	"Hail Mary"	5:08
9.	"Devil Inside"	4:19
10.	"Shut Up"	3:15
Total length:		42:25
