= I Declare: Treason =

Studio album by Doctor Midnight & The Mercy Cult
- Released: 6 June 2011
- Genre: Alternative metal
- Length: 43:44
- Label: Season of Mist
- Producer: Tim Skold

Singles from I Declare: Trason
- 1. "(Don't) Waste It" Released: 9 May 2011

I Declare: Treason is the debut album by Scandinavian supergroup Doctor Midnight & The Mercy Cult. It was released on 6 June 2011 through Season of Mist. The album was preceded by the single "(Don't) Waste It", released on 9 May.

== Overview ==
Doctor Midnight & The Mercy Cult was formed in 2009 by former-Turbonegro vocalist Hank von Helvete, former-Marilyn Manson and KMFDM multi-instrumentalist Tim Sköld, guitarists Anders Odden of Cadaver and Satyricon, and Audun Stengel of Apoptygma Berzerk and The Kovenant, and former-Extol drummer David Husvik. DMTMC recorded their debut album through studio sessions in Oslo, Stockholm and Los Angeles.

The band signed with record label Season of Mist in January 2011 and released their debut single, "(Don't) Waste It", on 9 May, with the B-side "Sacrifice (The Napoleon Iscariot Chant)". DMTMC played their debut concert on May 11 in Helsinki, Finland. I Declare: Treason was released on June 6 to mixed reviews. A limited edition of the album with an additional two bonus tracks was also released. The band performed at different European festivals in support of the album before disbanding later in 2011.

== Track listing ==
All tracks are written by Doctor Midnight & The Mercy Cult.

| No. | Title | Length |
|---|---|---|
| 1. | "You Are God - Intro" | 1:23 |
| 2. | "Sign My Name" | 4:38 |
| 3. | "I Declare: Treason" | 4:18 |
| 4. | "Bleed Idiot Bleed" | 4:02 |
| 5. | "(Don't) Waste It" | 4:06 |
| 6. | "Blame Is The Game" | 4:09 |
| 7. | "OK (We're Just About To Die)" | 4:16 |
| 8. | "Misconception" | 3:35 |
| 9. | "Glory (Throw The Axe)" | 4:37 |
| 10. | "Revenge" | 4:17 |
| 11. | "Victorious" | 4:23 |
| Total length: | | 43:44 |

Limited edition bonus tracks
| No. | Title | Length |
|---|---|---|
| 12. | "Fools Gold" | 4:00 |
| 13. | "The Whore In The West" | 3:24 |
| Total length: | | 51:08 |

== Personnel ==
Doctor Midnight & The Mercy Cult

- Hank von Helvete – vocals
- Tim Sköld – bass, producer, mixer, artwork
- Anders Odden – guitars
- Audun Stengel – guitars
- David Husvik – drums

Additional personnel

- Arne Aasland – engineer (additional)
- Kjartan Vestvik – engineer (additional)
- Per Øyvind Paulsen – engineer (additional)
- Shaun Thingvold – mastering
- Sandra Jensen – photography
- Mark Sommer – management
- Synthetic Entertainment – management
