= Neverland (Skold EP) =

EP by Tim Skold
- Released: 1996
- Genre: Industrial rock
- Label: RCA

Tim Skold chronology
Skold (1996)	Neverland (1996)	Anomie (2011)

Neverland is an EP released in 1996 by the musician Tim Skold.

== Track listing ==
1. "Neverland (Edit)" (3:30)
2. "Anything (Album Version)" (4:07)
3. "All Dies" (5:00)
4. "Neverland (Fuzzy Klub Mix I)" (4:23)
5. "Neverland (Fuzzy Klub Mix II)" (7:25)
6. "Anything (Dominatrix Mix)" (5:45)
7. "Remember (Martin Atkins Doubly Dub Mix)" (5:10)
