= Anomie (Tim Skold album) =

Studio album by Tim Skold
- Released: May 10, 2011
- Genres: Industrial rock; industrial metal
- Producer: Tim Skold

Tim Skold chronology
Neverland (1996)	Anomie (2011)	The Undoing (2016)

Anomie is the second full-length studio album by Swedish rock artist Tim Skold. It was released in 2011.

== Reception ==
Sputnikmusic rated the album 4.0, noting "I can tell you one thing for sure, Anomie is probably making all of those other bands piss themselves for not trying harder to keep him around."

== Track listing ==
No.	Title	Length
1.	"(This Is My) Elephant"
2.	"Suck"
3.	"Black Out"
4.	"Angel of Noise"
5.	"Satellite"
6.	"Becoming"
7.	"The Hunger"
8.	"Here Comes the Thunder"
9.	"And Then We Die"
10.	"Miserably Never Ever"
11.	"Tonight"
12.	"What You See Is What You Get"

Digital deluxe bonus tracks
No.	Title	Length
13.	"Polka Dot Dress"
14.	"Deserve"
