= Cooper Blankenship =

American politician (1929–2015)

Member of the Texas House of Representatives from the 51-1 district
- In office January 12, 1965 – December 31, 1966

Personal details
- Born: August 27, 1929 Texarkana, Texas, U.S.
- Died: June 18, 2015 (aged 86)
- Party: Democratic
- Education: Harvard University; Southern Methodist University

Cooper Blankenship (August 27, 1929 – June 18, 2015) was an American politician. He served as a Democratic member for the 51-1 district of the Texas House of Representatives.

== Life and career ==
Blankenship was born in Texarkana, Texas. He attended Harvard University and Southern Methodist University.

Blankenship served in the Texas House of Representatives from 1965 to 1966.

Blankenship died on June 18, 2015, at the age of 85.
