= Skold vs. KMFDM =

Studio album by Tim Sköld, KMFDM
- Released: 24 February 2009
- Genre: Industrial rock, electro-industrial
- Length: 70:33
- Label: KMFDM

KMFDM vs... chronology
Sin Sex & Salvation (1994)	Skold vs. KMFDM (2009)

Professional ratings
Review scores
Source	Rating
ReGen Magazine	4/5 stars

Skold vs. KMFDM is a full-length album featuring Sascha Konietzko of KMFDM and Tim Sköld. The album consists of two versions of 11 different songs — each appearing as the original version and a shorter "interlude" version. The album was released on 24 February 2009 on KMFDM Records exclusively through the band's KMFDM Store. It has since been made available for download elsewhere, minus the interludes.

The artwork for the album's cover was created by artist Kevin Marburg, formerly of the bands Diatribe and SKOLD.

== Track listing ==
No.	Title	Length
1.	"Why Me?"	4:31
2.	"Bloodsport" (interlude)	1:06
3.	"Antigeist"	5:14
4.	"Alkohol" (interlude)	0:52
5.	"Bloodsport"	5:07
6.	"Error 404" (interlude)	1:58
7.	"Love Is Like"	4:08
8.	"Antigeist" (interlude)	1:07
9.	"It's Not What"	4:15
10.	"Love Is Like" (interlude)	1:01
11.	"A Common Enemy"	4:59
12.	"Porn, Kitsch & Firearms" (interlude)	1:41
13.	"Error 404"	3:37
14.	"All or Nothing" (interlude)	0:57
15.	"Porn, Kitsch & Firearms"	4:36
16.	"It's Not What" (interlude)	1:23
17.	"Gromky"	5:18
18.	"A Common Enemy" (interlude)	1:29
19.	"Alkohol"	5:28
20.	"Gromky" (interlude)	1:43
21.	"All or Nothing"	5:04
22.	"Why Me?" (interlude)	2:26
Total length:		70:33
