= Kim Blankenship =

American sociologist

- Education: College of William & Mary; Duke University
- Scientific career
- Fields: Sociology, HIV/AIDS
- Workplaces: Yale University; Duke University; American University

Kim M. Blankenship is an American sociologist and academic administrator whose research focuses on social determinants of health, including HIV/AIDS, race, class, and gender inequalities. She is a professor and the associate dean of research in the American University College of Arts and Sciences, where she directs the Center on Health, Risk, and Society to advance interdisciplinary research on health disparities.

== Education ==
Blankenship completed a B.A. in sociology at College of William & Mary. She earned a M.A. (1982) in sociology and a Ph.D. (1988) in sociology at Duke University. Her dissertation was titled, Sex Discrimination in Employment: An Analysis of U.S. Federal Policy.

== Career ==
Blankenship began her academic career at Yale University in 1986 as an assistant professor in the department of sociology. From 1990 to 1993, she held a dual role as assistant professor and director of undergraduate studies for the sociology department. Afterward, she served as a lecturer in sociology until 1994, during which time her research focused on structural and social determinants of health, with particular attention to HIV/AIDS, race, and gender inequalities.

Her early research roles expanded in 1994 when she became an associate research scientist at Yale's department of internal medicine, AIDS program, where she researched the implications of HIV on marginalized communities. She maintained this research role in the department of epidemiology and public health until 2008, and in 1998, she was appointed associate director of Yale's Center for Interdisciplinary Research on AIDS (CIRA). During her tenure, she led projects on structural interventions to address HIV/AIDS disparities, funded by organizations such as the National Institute of Mental Health (NIMH) and the National Institute on Drug Abuse (NIDA). Her studies included analyses of how criminal justice policies influenced HIV risk among drug-using populations and incarcerated women.

In 2008, Blankenship transitioned to Duke University as an associate research professor in the sociology department and the Duke Global Health Institute. While at Duke, her research continued to address social determinants of health, specifically examining the relationships among housing instability, HIV risk, and incarceration within vulnerable communities.

In 2010, Blankenship joined American University College of Arts and Sciences as professor and chair of the sociology department and became the founding director of the Center on Health, Risk, and Society. This interdisciplinary center emphasized social science research to understand health disparities within various populations, advancing Blankenship's focus on structural determinants of health related to HIV/AIDS and public health more broadly.

Between 2013 and 2015, Blankenship served as director of the social and behavioral sciences core at the District of Columbia Center for AIDS Research (DC CFAR), the first multi-university research center to address HIV/AIDS in Washington, D.C. In 2015, she also led the DC CFAR's highly impacted populations scientific working group. Her work in these roles furthered her research into the socio-structural factors influencing health disparities among marginalized groups. In 2016, she was awarded a NIMH grant as the principal investigator for a study titled “Social Determinants of HIV,” which explored how mass incarceration and housing stability intersected to influence HIV risk.

In August 2017, she returned to American University as a professor of sociology, resuming her role as director of the Center on Health, Risk, and Society. In 2018, she was appointed associate dean of research in the College of Arts and Sciences. Since 2020, Blankenship has co-directed the developmental core at DC CFAR, leading collaborative efforts focused on addressing health disparities within Washington, D.C.

Throughout her career, Blankenship's research has received funding from the Bill & Melinda Gates Foundation, which supported her studies on HIV prevention in India. Her projects emphasized community mobilization and structural approaches to reduce health risks among vulnerable populations.
