= Robert E. Blankenship =

American chemist

Robert E. Blankenship is an American chemist.

Blankenship earned a Bachelor of Science degree in chemistry from Nebraska Wesleyan University in 1970, and obtained a doctorate in the subject at University of California, Berkeley in 1975. Upon completing postdoctoral research at the University of Washington in 1979, Blankenship began his teaching career as an assistant professor at Amherst College in 1979. He assumed an associate professorship at Arizona State University in 1985, and was promoted to full professor in 1988. Blankenship chaired the ASU Department of Chemistry and Biochemistry from 2002 to his retirement from the university in 2006, when he was granted emeritus status. In 2006, Blankenship joined Washington University in St. Louis as Lucille P. Markey Distinguished Professor in Arts and Sciences. He held the position until 2019, when he became professor emeritus.

Blankenship’s research interests are primarily concerned with biophysical aspects of photosynthesis. He has authored 450 publications, including 6 books. His textbook, Molecular Mechanisms of Photosynthesis, is now in its 4th Edition (ISBN 978-1-394-36725-2).
