= Finding Neverland (soundtrack) =

Album by Jan A. P. Kaczmarek

Soundtrack album by Jan A. P. Kaczmarek
- Released: November 2, 2004
- Recorded: 2004
- Genre: Classical
- Length: 58:21
- Label: Decca _{B0003429-02}
- Producer: Jan A. P. Kaczmarek

Jan A. P. Kaczmarek chronology
Unfaithful (2002)	Finding Neverland (2004)	Kto nigdy nie zyl (2006)

Professional ratings
Review scores
Source	Rating
Allmusic	3.5/5 stars
Filmtracks	4/5 stars
SoundtrackNet	2/5 stars

Finding Neverland is the original soundtrack album, on the Decca label, of the 2004 film Finding Neverland starring Johnny Depp, Kate Winslet, Julie Christie, Radha Mitchell, and Dustin Hoffman. The original score and songs were composed and produced by Jan A. P. Kaczmarek. Featured soloists on the recording include Polish jazz pianist, producer and film composer Leszek Możdżer, who performed the piano parts.

== Track listing ==
1. "Where Is Mr. Barrie?" – 3:32
2. "The Park" – 1:07
3. "Dancing with the Bear" – 2:03
4. "The Kite" – 1:37
5. "The Chess" – 1:07
6. "Neverland – Piano Variation in Blue" – 4:29
7. "The Spoon on the Nose" – 1:28
8. "The Pirates" – 2:11
9. "The Marriage" – 2:40
10. "Children Arrive" – 3:15
11. "Drive to the Cottage" – 1:04
12. "The Peter Pan Overture" – 1:17
13. "Peter" – 2:20
14. "The Park on Piano" – 5:23
15. "The Stairs" – 2:14
16. "Impossible Opening" – 3:26
17. "The Rehearsal" – 1:20
18. "Neverland – Minor Piano Variation" – 3:39
19. "The Play and the Flight" – 1:21
20. "This Is Neverland" – 4:01
21. "Why Does She Have to Die?" – 2:05
22. "Another Bear" – 3:11
23. "Forgotten Overture" – 3:31

== Recognition ==
The album won the Academy Award for Best Original Score. It was also nominated for the BAFTA Award for Best Film Music and the Golden Globe Award for Best Original Score. All songs are composed and produced by Jan A. P. Kaczmarek.
