= Tim Skold =

Swedish musician and producer (born 1966)

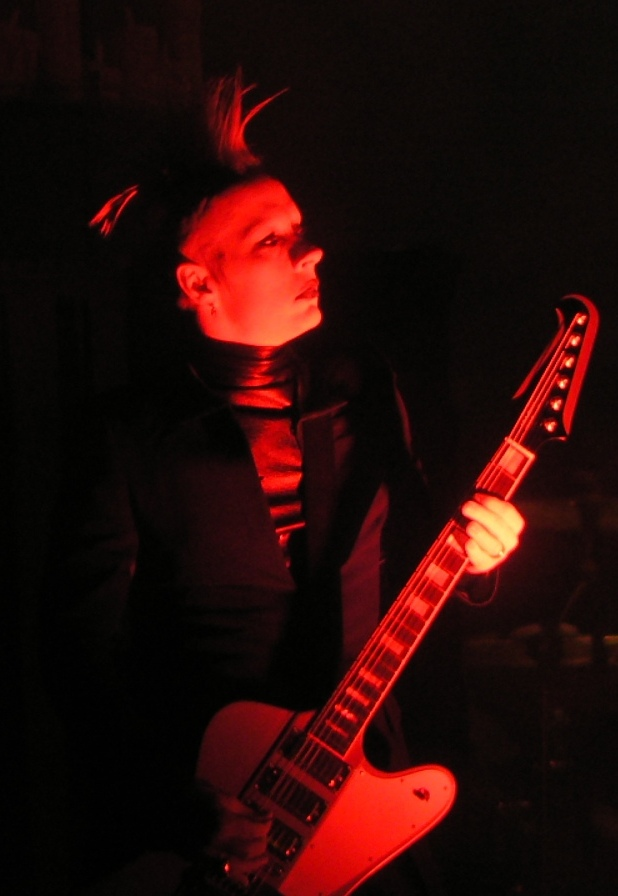
- Skold performing with Marilyn Manson in 2007

Background information
- Also known as: Tim Tim, Skold
- Born: Thim Sköld; 14 December 1966 (age 59); Skövde, Sweden
- Genres: Industrial rock; industrial metal; electro-industrial
- Occupations: Musician; record producer
- Instruments: Guitar; bass; keyboards; drums; vocals
- Years active: 1985–present
- Labels: Metropolis; Relativity; Wax Trax!; Interscope; Nothing; Cleopatra
- Member of: Marilyn Manson
- Formerly of: Shotgun Messiah; KMFDM; MDFMK; Doctor Midnight & The Mercy Cult
- Website: skold.com

Tim Skold (born Thim Sköld; 14 December 1966) is a Swedish musician and record producer who produces solo work and has also collaborated with multiple musical groups including Shotgun Messiah, KMFDM, Marilyn Manson and Motionless in White.

== Biography ==
=== Early life ===
Born in Skövde, Skold grew up in Timmersdala, outside of Skövde. Influenced by the New Wave of British Heavy Metal, he acquired his first bass guitar at age 12 and played in various cover bands. He later met guitarist Harry "Harry Cody" Kemppainen at a New Year's Eve party, and the two formed a creative partnership with a shared dream of becoming rock stars in the United States. At age 17, after two years of studying Process Engineering at a boarding school, Skold moved into his own apartment and took a factory job making military equipment. A half-year later, he was drafted into the army. He brought his bass to the base and sneaked into the shower stalls to practice after everyone went to sleep. Skold also kept rehearsing with Cody on the weekends, and once out of the army he took on many odd jobs, including working as a library assistant, Volvo employee and gardener at a bathhouse.

=== Kingpin ===
During the early 1980s, Skold and Cody formed the glam metal band Kingpin in their native Skövde, Sweden. The duo were inspired by the flamboyant hard rock bands flowing out of Los Angeles at the time, as well as the UK acts such as Sigue Sigue Sputnik and Zodiac Mindwarp. The duo drafted vocalist Zinny J. Zan and drummer Stixx Galore a short time later to complete the band's lineup. Kingpin's first release was a 1987 single titled "Shout It Out", which reached number 1 in Swedish charts. They released their only album, Welcome to Bop City, the following year, and subsequently moved to Los Angeles.

=== Shotgun Messiah ===
Signed by Cliff Cultreri at Relativity Records, Kingpin changed their name to Shotgun Messiah due to a San Francisco-based act holding the rights to the band name. The band remixed and re-packaged Welcome To Bop City as a self-titled album and released it as their international debut in 1989. The album would go on to sell almost 500,000 copies and reached top 100 on the Billboard charts. The music videos for the singles "Don't Care 'Bout Nothin'" and "Shout It Out" regularly featured on MTV's Headbanger's Ball.

Whilst the band was in the process of making a follow-up to their debut self-titled album, singer Zan was let go. On Cody's suggestion, Skold switched to lead vocals and the members hired a new bassist, Bobby Lycon from New York City. The band released their second album, Second Coming, in October 1991 to rave reviews. The album featured two singles, "Heartbreak Blvd." and "Living Without You".

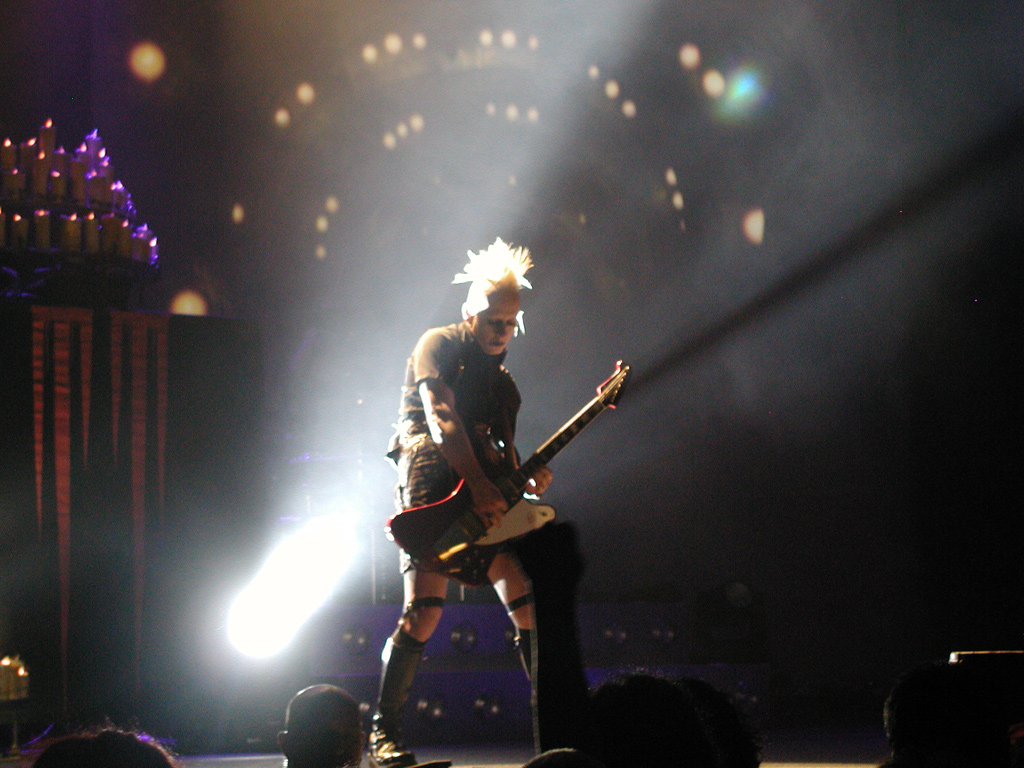
Skold performing live in 2007

In November 1992, Shotgun Messiah released the five-track EP I Want More, which featured two new punk cover tracks and a re-recorded "Babylon" punk cover, along with a re-recorded "I Want More" edit and an acoustic version of "Nobody's Home", all three from their previous album Second Coming. Soon after came the departure of Stixx and Lycon.

Still under contract with Relativity Records, Skold and Cody returned to Sweden for the recording of the third Shotgun Messiah album, Violent New Breed, which leaned towards the industrial end of the heavy metal genre. The album was released in September 1993 to mixed reviews and continued public indifference due to the popularity of the grunge genre, which eventually convinced Skold and Cody to end the band, leading Skold to embark on an eponymous solo project.

=== SKOLD ===
Following the break-up of Shotgun Messiah, Skold went on to pursue a solo career. Writing all songs and playing all instruments himself, his self-titled debut album, Skold, was released in 1996 by RCA. The album was co-produced with Scott Humphrey. Promoting his debut album, Skold and the rest of the live SKOLD band went on a short tour with Genitorturers. Some of the songs on the Skold album were used in movies like Disturbing Behavior ("Hail Mary"), Universal Soldier: The Return ("Chaos") and the PlayStation game Twisted Metal 4 ("Chaos"). During his solo career, Skold also provided remixes for several bands, such as Prong, Nature and Drown. He also met KMFDM front-man Sascha Konietzko during his time in the studio.

Around 2002, Skold recorded a follow up to his 1996 self-titled album. Skold stated in an interview with The Sychophant that he had made a demo with only 10 copies ever made. The demo had 10 songs on it. Six of the 10 were released on file sharing networks without Skold's permission: "Burn", "Dead God", "I Hate", "Believe", "The Point", and "Don't Pray". The demo is known as the Dead God EP, although Skold says that it was called Disrupting the Orderly Routine of the Institution. The original artwork was made with an inkjet printer and was the title written in drippy letters. This demo was given to several friends that Skold considered trustworthy, but his songs appeared on the Internet from one of them. Skold said that "someone suggested to me that I should go back to them and finish it off and release it. And maybe I will one day, who knows?" All 10 songs were eventually officially released in 2022 as the album Dead God.

On 3 November 2009 "I Will Not Forget", "A Dark Star", and "Bullets Ricochet" were released on iTunes and Amazon as new SKOLD singles. Also that November, Skold's official website announced that he was to release his second solo album in early 2010. However, the album remained unreleased in 2010. In January 2011, Metropolis Records announced that they were releasing the new record and single in spring of 2011. On 10 May 2011 SKOLD released Anomie.

Originally announced on 17 March 2014, the album, entitled The Undoing, was originally slated for self-release in April 2014. Problems with that model arose and the album release was halted until 2016 when SKOLD rejoined with Metropolis Records to release the work. In support of this album, SKOLD began "The Undoing Tour 2016" in May 2016 with the western United States; the live line up featured Tiffany Lowe on keyboards and Eli James on drums. This was followed by a cross-US North American tour in November and December 2016. The setlist spanned Tim's entire career and contained such hits as "Personal Jesus", "Error 404", "Anarchy", "Tainted Love", as well as "Chaos" and "Hail Mary" from his debut album, just to name a few. He was very accessible after shows and more than happy to discuss firearms and lipstick, as well as gear over a beer.

In 2018, SKOLD released a cover of the song "White As Chalk" by Leæther Strip on the compilation album Heært Combine.

On 5 April 2019, SKOLD released the album Never Is Now on Cleopatra Records.

On 5 March 2021, SKOLD released the album Dies Irae on Cleopatra Records.

In 2022, the long-awaited exhumation of (a) 'Dead God' was performed and realised, offering up a proper release and making his proclamations upon the "true" evils of organized religion and idolatry official.

On 28 July 2023, SKOLD released the album Seven Heads with the single "Rat King", also on Cleopatra Records.

=== KMFDM and MDFMK ===
After a short-lived solo career, Skold joined KMFDM in 1997. His first involvement with KMFDM was on the album Symbols. He wrote and sang the song "Anarchy", which became a hit in clubs, and spawned subsequent remixes of the track done by Skold himself. His next album with KMFDM, Adios, was released in 1999. Skold took a more prominent role in the band, not only as co-vocalist, co-writer, and bassist, but also as producer, engineer, and programmer, alongside KMFDM's founder Sascha Konietzko.

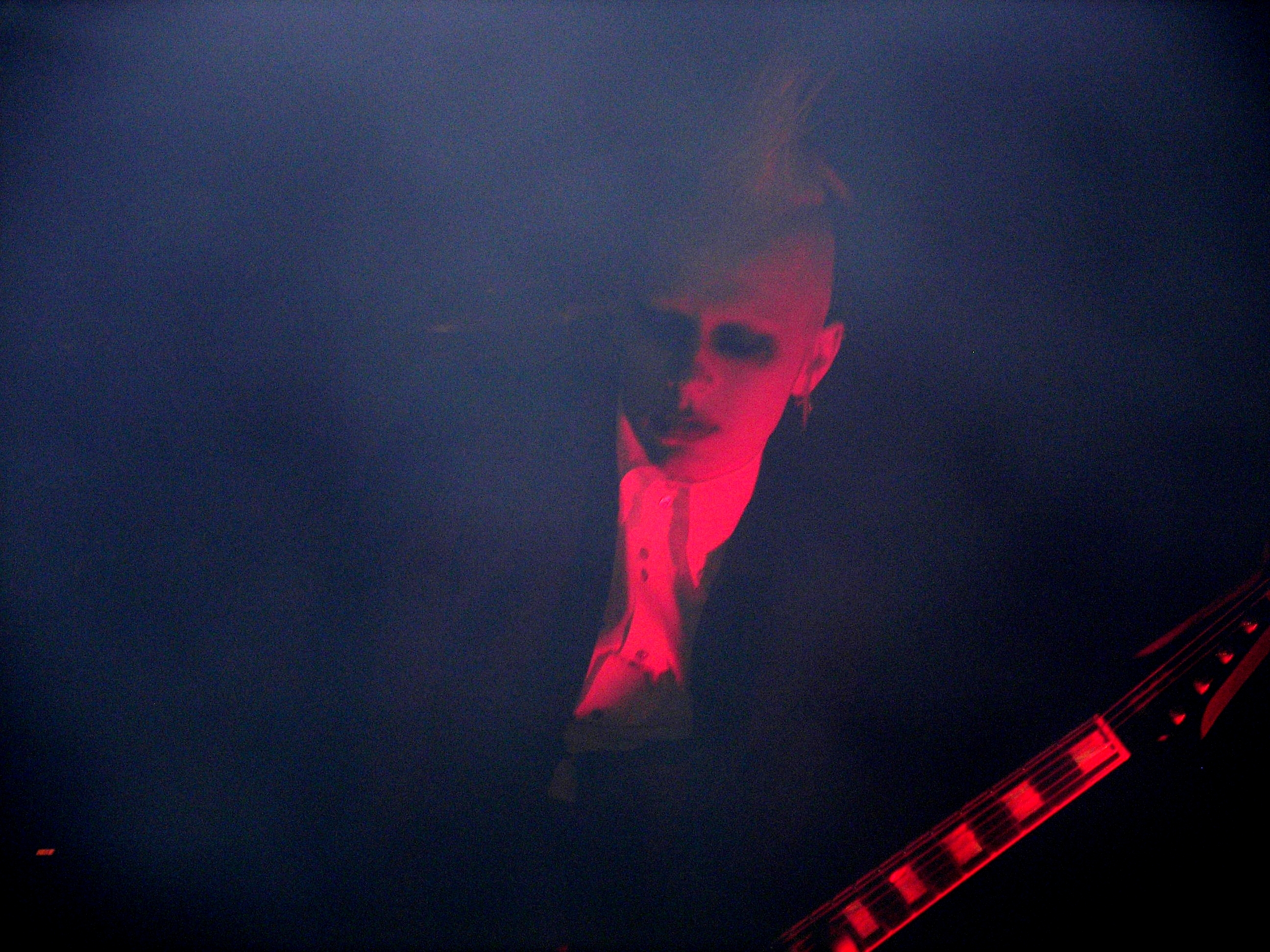
Skold with Marilyn Manson in 2007

Due to turmoil within the band, Konietzko and Skold ended KMFDM in 1999, and restarted as MDFMK the following year. They released one album, MDFMK, released in 2000 by Universal Records. The band, including Lucia Cifarelli (formerly of Drill), took on a more "futuristic" sound, which contained less of the industrial rock KMFDM was known for, and added a mix of drum & bass, trance and europop, primarily in a production style leaning towards "electronica". MDFMK featured all three members sharing vocal duties. Their song "Missing Time" was used in the animated movie Heavy Metal 2000.

In 2002, the trio reformed KMFDM along with Raymond Watts, and released Attak. Afterwards, Skold departed the band. Due to a commitment to produce Marilyn Manson's album The Golden Age of Grotesque, Skold was unable to join KMFDM's 2002 Sturm & Drang tour; he did, however, make two guest appearances at shows in June.

On 16 December 2008, the KMFDM website announced that Skold and Konietzko would be releasing an album together, titled Skold vs. KMFDM. The album was released on 24 February 2009.

Skold did production and instrumentation work on KMFDM's album Blitz, released 24 March 2009. Later that same year he contributed a remix to Left Spine Down's 2009 remix album entitled Voltage 2.3: Remixed and Revisited, as well as 16volt's album American Porn Songs.

=== Newlydeads and ohGr ===
Skold performed a show as a fill-in guitarist with Taime Downe's The Newlydeads on 13 December 2000 at the Pretty Ugly Club in Los Angeles. Skold, on bass, joined ohGr, a project of Skinny Puppy vocalist Nivek Ogre, for the tour in support of its first album, Welt, in 2001, although he does not appear on the album.

=== Marilyn Manson ===
Skold's involvement with Marilyn Manson began as producer for the single "Tainted Love", which is featured in the 2001 teen comedy/parody movie Not Another Teen Movie and appeared on the soundtrack. Manson and Skold went on to score the movie Resident Evil, released in 2002. Several tracks are featured on the Resident Evil movie soundtrack.

Skold officially joined Marilyn Manson in 2002 after the departure of bassist Twiggy Ramirez. At this time, not only was Skold the bassist for the band, but he was also producing, editing, creating artwork, electronics, programming drums and beats, playing guitar, keyboards, accordion and synthesizer bass for the album The Golden Age of Grotesque.

He is described by Manson as, "the power that attitude brings to an album". On the band's 2004 release, Lest We Forget: The Best Of, Skold produced, played lead guitar, and sang backup vocals on the cover version of "Personal Jesus", which was also released as a single. Coinciding with the release of The Nightmare Before Christmas in 3D in October 2006, Manson and Skold contributed a cover of "This Is Halloween" to The Nightmare Before Christmas soundtrack, with Skold taking care of the music while Manson provided the vocals.

This time also saw the start of work on Marilyn Manson's sixth studio album entitled Eat Me, Drink Me. The album was released worldwide on 5 June 2007.

Skold played guitar on the band's 2007 world tour, Rape of the World, with Rob Holliday (formerly guitarist/bassist for Curve, Gary Numan, The Mission and The Prodigy) taking over bass duties.

On 9 January 2008, Marilyn Manson posted a bulletin on MySpace which reported that Skold had left the band and former bassist Twiggy Ramirez had returned to take his place.

In mid-November 2021, Rolling Stone reported that Skold was again working with Manson. However, no contributions from Skold appeared on Manson's comeback album One Assassination Under God - Chapter 1. In February of 2026, the reunion was seemingly confirmed to be happening, as both Manson and Skold posted a photograph of themselves together on their respective Instagram accounts.

=== Doctor Midnight & The Mercy Cult ===
In 2009, Skold formed the Scandinavian supergroup Doctor Midnight & The Mercy Cult with Hank von Helvete. They released their debut album, I Declare: Treason, on 6 June 2011.

=== Motionless in White ===
Skold, along with Jason Suecof, produced Motionless in White's 2012 studio album Infamous. Skold also contributed songwriting on 5 songs. Skold was also announced as a featured artist on the song "Final Dictvm" from the album Reincarnate.

=== Not My God ===
In January 2020, Skold and Nero Bellum announced a new project dubbed Not My God. Their self-titled album was released on 14 February 2020. The follow-up album, Simulacra, was released on 15 October 2021. Their third album, Obverses, was released on 12 May 2023.

=== Front Line Assembly ===
Skold played guitar with Front Line Assembly on their 2021 and 2023 tours.

== Musical styles ==
Skold has performed many different music genres ranging from glam metal to heavy metal to industrial rock to electro-industrial. His breakthrough band Shotgun Messiah evolved from the glam metal and hard rock genres to industrial rock for their third and final album. Beginning with the Skold solo project, he has recorded and performed mainly with industrial and heavy metal acts such as Marilyn Manson, KMFDM, MDFMK, ohGr, The Newlydeads and Doctor Midnight & The Mercy Cult.

== Musical equipment ==
Throughout his career Skold has played several different instruments and used equipment from different manufacturers. In a Behind the Player video released in 2008, Skold states that he uses Gibson Les Paul guitars in the studio and Gibson Firebird models live with Marshall amps, and Gretsch Broadkaster basses with Ampeg amps.

=== Guitars and bass guitars ===
- Gibson Les Paul – Black finish
- Gibson Firebird V – Cream white finish
- Gibson Firebird V – Black finish
- Gibson Firebird VII – Red finish
- Jackson X Series Kelly KEXM – White finish
- Roland G-707 Guitar Synthesizer
- Gretsch Broadkaster G6119B Bass – Orange
- Gretsch Broadkaster G6119B Bass – Walnut Stain
- Gretsch Broadkaster G6119B Bass – Red finish
- Gretsch Broadkaster G6119B Bass – Bamboo finish
- Gretsch Broadkaster G6119B Bass – Black finish
- King doublebass – White with black flames
- King doublebass – Wood
- D'Addario XL Strings
- Dunlop Tortex Picks

=== Effects ===
- Dunlop Cry Baby Bass Wah Wah
- Dunlop MXR M-103 Blue Box
- BOSS GT-6
- BOSS GT-6B Multi-Effects Units
- Dunlop MXR Smart Gate Pedal
- Dunlop MXR 10 Band EQ
- Dunlop MXR GT-OD Overdrive
- Dunlop MXR Distortion III

=== Amplification ===
- Ampeg SVT-4PRO head
- Ampeg SVT-810E cabinet
- Blankenship Variplex (2)
- Marshall Amps
- BIAS MINI

== Discography ==
=== Kingpin ===
- Welcome to Bop City (1988)

=== Shotgun Messiah ===
- Shotgun Messiah (1989)
- Second Coming (October 1991)
- Violent New Breed (1993)

=== Skold ===
==== Studio albums ====
- Skold (1996)
- Anomie (2011)
- The Undoing (2016)
- Never Is Now (2019)
- Dies Irae (2021)
- Dead God (2022)
- Seven Heads (2023)
- Caught In The Throes (2025)

==== Studio EPs ====
- Neverland (1996)
- Tonight (2011)

=== KMFDM ===
- Symbols (1997)
- "Megalomaniac" (1998)
- Adios (1999)
- "Boots" (2002)
- Attak (2002)
- Blitz (2009)

=== MDFMK ===
- MDFMK (2000)

=== Marilyn Manson ===
==== Studio albums ====
- The Golden Age of Grotesque (2003)
- Eat Me, Drink Me (2007)

==== Compilation albums ====
- Lest We Forget: The Best Of (2004)

=== Skold vs. KMFDM ===
- Skold vs. KMFDM (2009)

=== Doctor Midnight & The Mercy Cult ===
- I Declare: Treason (2011)

=== Motionless in White ===
- "Mallevs Maleficarvm" (Tim Skold Remix) (2012)
- Infamous (production) (2012)
- "Final Dictvm" (feat. Tim Skold) (2014)

=== Aesthetic Perfection ===
- Imperfect (live CD/DVD) (acoustic guitar) (recorded 2013, released 2015)

=== Not My God ===
- NOT MY GOD (2020)
- Simulacra (2021)
- Obverses (2023)

== Filmography ==
- In God's Hands (1998)
- Doppelherz (2003)
- Better the Devil (2016)
