= Easy Action (band) =

Swedish rock band

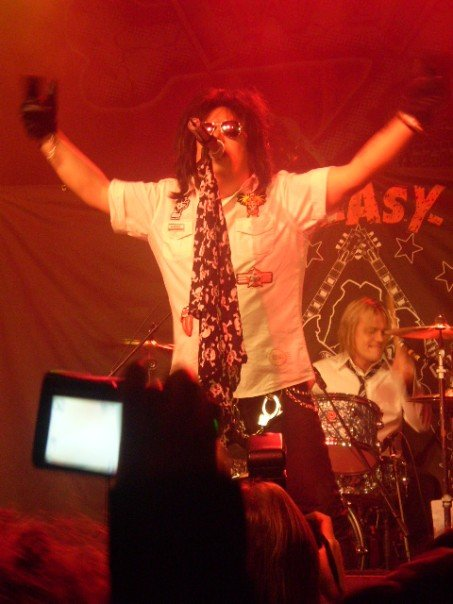

Background information
- Origin: Stockholm, Sweden
- Genres: Hard rock, AOR, glam metal
- Years active: 1981–1988, 2006–present
- Members: Kee Marcello; Chris Lind; Tommy Nilsson "Grizzly" Höglund; Björn Påhlsson
- Past members: Danny Wilde; Fredrik Von Gerber; Alex Tyrone (Peo Thyrén); Micael Grimm; Björne Fröberg; Pelle Almgren; Zinny J. Zan; Simon Roxx

Easy Action is a Swedish hard rock band from Stockholm, formed in 1981.

== History ==
The band was formed in 1981 by Pelle Almgren (ex-Warheads), Henrik "2 meter" Jermsten (ex-Stoodes), Bosse Belsen (aka Zinny J. Zan later of Shotgun Messiah/Kingpin/Zan Clan – drums) and Björne Fröberg (bass, ex-Warheads). Bosse and Björne quit and were replaced by Ola "Skox" Andersson and drummer Urban "Ubbe" Sundbaum (ex-Lustans Lakejer). Stranded Rekords became interested and released the single "Honcho Bongo". It did not sell well, and when the second single, "Om jag vore kung", also failed, the band split up. Skox and 2 meter formed Psyhedelic Mongo and Pelle Almgren started writing songs instead.

Easy Action was reformed as a glam metal band in 1982 by Kee Marcello and Alex Tyrone (aka Peo Thyrén). The two had played together in the Swedish punk rock band Noice when they decided to start the ultimate glam rock band, mixing their influences of 1970s glam rock with a punk/metal attitude. They met original singer Bosse Belsen, now named Zinny J. Zan, at the Stockholm rock club Ritz and he recorded his vocals on the first demos the same night. Later former Noice drummer Fredrik Von Gerber and guitarist Danny Wilde (not to be confused with the American singer/musician (and member of The Rembrandts) of the same name) joined the band, followed by Noice bassist, Per-Olof Thyrén.

In 1983, they got signed to the US major label Sire and became the first Swedish band ever to sign a worldwide record deal. After releasing two albums; Easy Action in 1983, and That Makes One in 1986, the latter of whom, featured singer Tommy Nilsson replacing Zinny J. Zan, guitarist and band leader Kee Marcello left the band to join Europe, where he went on to have worldwide success, selling over 30 million albums. Easy Action continued on for two more years with other members including Neon Rose and Bam Bam Boys guitarist Gunnar Hallin and keyboard player Jörgen Ingeström, but split afterwards. Original vocalist Zinny J. Zan went on to join the Skövde glam metal band Kingpin, later renamed Shotgun Messiah.

Poison used a similar chorus to Easy Action's 1983 single "We Go Rocking" in their hit single "I Want Action", which led to the members of Easy Action suing the American band's record label and accepting a financial settlement in the case.

Easy Action reunited for a gig at the Sweden Rock Festival in 2006. This was followed by several shows in late 2007, including opening for Twisted Sister. In April 2008, the band went in the studio with producer Chris Laney to record a new studio album. In 2011, bassist Micael Grimm died.

On 18 December 2018, Easy Action was confirmed to play at the Sweden Rock Festival in 2019. The concert included a live performance of the album That Makes One in its entirety, performed by the line-up that recorded it, including vocalist Tommy Nilsson and guitarists Kee Marcello and Chris Lind.

In 2025, Easy Action announced a reunion and that work started on a new album called That Makes Two. The line-up was Nilsson, Marcello, Lind, Påhlsson, Höglund and Ingeström. They also announced an appearance at the Time To Rock festival in Knislinge in June 2026 and another at the Wings of AOR festival in Norrköping in April 2026.

== Personnel ==
=== Current line-up ===
- Kee Marcello – lead guitar, backing vocals (1981–1986, 2006–2011, 2019–present)
- Chris Lind – rhythm guitar (1984–1988, 2019–present)
- Tommy Nilsson – lead vocals (1985–1988, 2019–present)
- Björn Påhlsson – bass (1985–1988, 2019–present)
- "Grizzly" Höglund – drums (2006–2011, 2019–present)
- Jörgen Ingeström – keyboards (live only) (1985–1988, 2019–present)

=== Former members ===
- Björne Fröberg – guitar (1981–1982)
- Pelle Almgren – lead vocals (1981–1982)
- Henrik "2 meter" Jermsten – guitar (1981–1982)
- Ola "Skox" Andersson – bass (1981–1982)
- Urban "Ubbe" Sundbaum – drums (1981–1982)
- Zinny J. Zan – lead vocals (1981–1985, 2006–2011)
- Danny Wilde – guitar (1982–1984)
- Alex Tyrone (Peo Thyrén) – bass (1982–1985)
- Fredrik Von Gerber – drums (1982–1988)
- Gunnar Hallin – guitar (1987–1988)
- Micael Grimm – bass (2006–2011)
- Simon Roxx – guitar (2006–2011)

== Discography ==
=== Studio albums ===
- Easy Action (1983)
- That Makes One (1986)

=== Singles ===
- "Honcho Bongo" (1982)
- "Om jag vore kung" (1982)
- "We Go Rocking" (1983)
- "The End of the Line" (1983)
- "Round Round Round" (1984)

== See also ==
- List of glam metal bands and artists
