= List of KMFDM members =

This is a comprehensive listing of the current and former members of KMFDM, an industrial band formed by Sascha Konietzko in 1984. KMFDM existed from 1984 until they broke up in 1999; however, they continued under the name MDFMK until the KMFDM name was revived in 2002. Konietzko has been the only permanent member throughout the band's history. Individuals that simultaneously played live and contributed in the studio were regarded as official members, as also indicated by promotional material or liner notes. In addition, numerous individuals had only performed live while others had only appeared on studio material; thus, both instances were not treated in an official capacity.

== Members ==
=== Current ===
Image	Name	Years active	Instruments	Release contributions
	Sascha Konietzko (Note: Sascha Konietzko formed KMFDM in 1984 as an art project for performances at live exhibitions. He eventually transformed the project into a full-time band. Konietzko has been the only consistent member of the band, and he is the only member to appear on every album. Due to this, he has handled a variety of duties in the studio, although lead vocals, guitars, bass, and percussion remained his focus for live shows.)	1984–present	vocals; guitars; bass; programming; keyboards; synthesizer; percussion; production; engineering; mixing	all KMFDM and MDFMK releases
	Lucia Cifarelli (Note: Lucia Cifarelli was previously the vocalist for the industrial rock band Drill in the 1990s. After the band dissolved, Konietzko invited Cifarelli to join his side-project MDFMK (which was essentially a continuation of the KMFDM band). Cifarelli handled vocals for MDFMK's singular album. When Konietzko revived the KMFDM name in 2002, Cifarelli was brought in as vocalist and keyboardist, making her first KMFDM appearance on the "Boots" single. Cifarelli and Konietzko eventually married in 2005. Overall, with the exception of Konietzko, Cifarelli is the longest-serving member of KMFDM.)	2000–present	vocals; keyboards	all MDFMK and KMFDM releases from MDFMK (2000) to present (Note: with the exception of Skold vs. KMFDM (2009).)
	Andy Selway (Note: Andy Selway initially toured as the drummer for PIG in the late 1990s. PIG's frontman, Raymond Watts, then invited Selway to join KMFDM when Watts returned to KMFDM in 2002. Selway was the touring drummer for about a year, but in 2003, he officially joined the band as the full-time drummer. Selway has the third-longest timespan in KMFDM, behind only Cifarelli and Konietzko.)	2003–present (touring in 2002–2003)	drums; percussion	all KMFDM releases from WWIII (2003) to present
	Tidor Nieddu (Note: After Andee Blacksugar was dismissed from the band in 2025, KMFDM scheduled several shows in Europe for the first time in numerous years. For the shows, the band brought in Tidor Nieddu as guitarist.)	2025–present	guitars	Enemy (2026)

=== Former members ===
Image	Name	Years active	Instruments	Release contributions
	Raymond Watts (Note: Although Raymond Watts did not create KMFDM alongside Konietzko, he did however join shortly after their formation as vocalist and programmer. The duo of Konietzko and Watts worked closely together on a string of albums in the 1980s; however, shortly before the release of Don't Blow Your Top in 1988, Watts departed from KMFDM to focus on his solo career (primarily his PIG project). Watts later collaborated with Konietzko on the PIG vs. KMFDM EP Sin Sex & Salvation in 1994. The project led to Watts rejoining KMFDM, as he appeared on Nihil in 1995. He then returned in 1997 for the Symbols album, but departed from the band shortly after. When Konietzko revived the KMFDM name in 2002, he invited Watts back into the band. Watts' touring band for PIG (which included Selway on drums, Steve White on guitar, and Jules Hodgson on guitar) also joined the KMFDM lineup around the same time. Watts recorded on Attak (2002) and WWIII (2003), and KMFDM's tours for the albums had sometimes included PIG songs in their setlist. Watts departed from KMFDM once again after the WWIII touring cycle. He later made a guest appearance on Paradise (2019) for a singular song, which marked his first collaboration with Konietzko in over 15 years.)	1984–1988; 1994–1995; 1997; 2002–2004 (guest in 2019)	vocals; programming	all KMFDM releases from Opium (1984) to Don't Blow Your Top (1988); PIG vs. KMFDM (1994); Nihil (1995); Symbols (1997); Attak (2002); WWIII (2003); Paradise (2019)
	En Esch (Nicklaus Schandelmaier) (Note: After the release of Opium in 1984, KMFDM expanded their lineup to include En Esch as drummer, guitarist, and vocalist. He worked closely alongside Konietzko and Watts on What Do You Know, Deutschland? (1986) and Don't Blow Your Top (1988); however, Watts departed from the band by 1988, and thus Esch took his place as the main collaborator alongside Konietzko. Esch and Konietzko had a falling out in 1991, and the duo planned to disband KMFDM with an album titled Apart. Both Konietzko and Esch were given one side of the album to themselves, but the band's record label rejected Esch's side, and they instead encouraged Konietzko to finish the entire album himself. Konietzko ultimately changed the album's direction, and repaired his friendship with Esch, followed by renaming Apart to Money. KMFDM eventually disbanded in 1999. Esch and KMFDM's guitarist Günter Schulz then formed the band Slick Idiot, and Esch also focused on his solo career as well. When Konietzko revived the KMFDM name in 2002, it was stated that both Esch and Schulz had no interest in rejoining the band. Esch later reunited with Watts as a touring member of Watts' PIG project on various occasions.)	1985–1999	vocals; drums; guitars; programming; percussion	all KMFDM releases from What Do You Know, Deutschland? (1986) to Adios (1999) (Note: with the exception of PIG vs. KMFDM (1994).)
	Rudolph Naomi (Note: Rudolph Naomi was the drummer for KMFDM from 1985 to 1986, and he also appeared on a few studio demos as well (which later appeared on the 84–86 compilation). He rejoined the band by 1988, and made his official debut on UAIOE the following year. He appeared on and co-wrote the majority of the Naïve album in 1990, but after the band relocated to the United States, Naomi departed from the band and returned to Germany.)	1985–1986; 1988–1991	drums	UAIOE (1989); Naïve (1990)
	Günter Schulz (Note: Günter Schulz joined KMFDM as their guitarist in 1989 to support the UAIOE album. He debuted in the studio with Naïve (1990). In 1992, Schulz had worked closely alongside Konietzko for the Money album. He was also a prominent member of the Excessive Force spin-off group, mainly on their second album Gentle Death. After KMFDM disbanded in 1999, Schulz and Esch formed the band Slick Idiot. When Konietzko revived the KMFDM name in 2002, it was stated that both Esch and Schulz had no interest in rejoining the band. Schulz later became the guitarist for former KMFDM member Watts' project PIG.)	1989–1999	guitars; programming	all KMFDM releases from Naïve (1990) to Adios (1999)
	Mark Durante (Note: Throughout the 1980s, guitarist Mark Durante played in a variety of metal bands, including the band Slammin' Watusis. He also briefly toured as KMFDM's guitarist in 1989. Durante and his Slammin' Watusis bandmate Lee Popa then appeared as guests on KMFDM's Naïve album in 1990. A few years later, Durante officially joined KMFDM as a guitarist. He debuted on Angst in 1993. He was also heavily featured on Excessive Force's album Gentle Death and the re-working of the Naïve album (under the title of Naïve/Hell to Go). Durante departed from the band in 1997 after the release of the Xtort album the prior year. Durante was initially in the lineup as KMFDM's full-time guitarist upon the band's revival in 2002, but he ultimately did not rejoin nor record in the studio (although he made a few guest appearances at live shows shortly after).)	1992–1997 (touring in 1989 and guest in 1990)	guitars	Naïve (1990); all KMFDM releases from Angst (1993) to Xtort (1996)
	Jennifer Ginsberg (Note: Initially in 1994, Jennifer Ginsberg was the receptionist at the Seattle studio where KMFDM and PIG recorded the Sin Sex & Salvation EP. PIG's frontman Watts asked Ginsberg to contribute vocals to the project. She subsequently joined KMFDM as their primary female vocalist on tour. After contributing to two additional albums, Ginsberg departed from the music industry entirely.)	1994–1996	vocals	PIG vs. KMFDM (1994); Nihil (1995); Xtort (1996)
	Bill Rieflin (Note: Bill Rieflin joined as the drummer for the industrial metal band Ministry in 1986. A few years later, Rieflin appeared as a guest on KMFDM's album Naïve, and both KMFDM and Ministry ended up touring together in the United States. After Rieflin left Ministry in 1994, he joined KMFDM the following year in time for the Nihil album. Konietzko disbanded KMFDM in 1999, but when he revived the name in 2002, he invited Rieflin back into the band. Rieflin departed after recording on 2003's WWIII album, but he later made a guest appearance on WTF?! in 2011. Rieflin died in 2020 due to colon cancer at the age of 59.)	1995–1999; 2002–2003 (guest in 1990 and 2011) (died 2020)	drums; programming; percussion; bass	Naïve (1990); all KMFDM releases from Nihil (1995) to WWIII (2003); WTF?! (2011)
	Tim Skold (Note: After the breakup of the glam metal band Shotgun Messiah in 1993, vocalist and bassist Tim Skold embarked on a solo career, during which he met Konietzko for the first time. In 1996, he released the album Skold in which he performed the vast majority of the instruments and handled the vast majority of the production himself. He re-connected with Konietzko a short time later, and joined KMFDM in time for their album Symbols in 1997 (although he only appeared on one song). The tour for Symbols had also sometimes featured songs in the setlist from Skold's self-titled album. Afterwards, Konietzko and Skold worked closely together for the Adios album in 1999; however, KMFDM disbanded shortly after. Konietzko and Skold remained together however, and they formed the band MDFMK. After releasing one album under the MDFMK name, Konietzko decided to revive the KMFDM name in 2002. Skold was initially a part of the lineup, but he was unable to tour behind the Attak album in 2002, although he appeared at a few live shows as a guest. He officially left the band that same year. In 2009, Skold and Konietzko worked together again, for both KMFDM's album Blitz and for the side-project release Skold vs. KMFDM.)	1997–2002; 2009	vocals; guitars; bass; drums; programming	all KMFDM and MDFMK releases from Symbols (1997) to Attak (2002); Blitz (2009); Skold vs. KMFDM (2009)
	Jules Hodgson (Note: When KMFDM was revived in 2002, the band's lineup featured Durante as the guitarist, but he ultimately decided not to rejoin, and as a result Jules Hodgson was selected as guitarist instead (Hodgson was previously a member of Watts' PIG project). Hodgson remained in the band until 2016, although in 2022 he made a guest appearance on the album Hyëna.)	2002–2016 (guest in 2022)	guitars; bass; keyboards	all KMFDM releases from Attak (2002) to Hell Yeah (2017); Hyëna (2022)
	Steve White (Note: Steve White was brought on as KMFDM's touring guitarist in 2002. He had previously played in Watts' PIG project. The following year, he became an official member of the band, although he didn't make his debut in the studio until Hau Ruck in 2005. White eventually departed from the band in 2015, after appearing on the album Our Time Will Come the prior year.)	2003–2015 (touring in 2002–2003)	guitars	all KMFDM releases from Hau Ruck (2005) to Our Time Will Come (2014)
	Andee Blacksugar (Note: KMFDM's tour to support 2017's Hell Yeah album initially had Chris Harms as the touring guitarist (as he had played on the majority of the album). Due to customs issues, Harms was unable to enter the United States for the tour; thus, Konietzko chose Andee Blacksugar as a quick replacement for the tour. Blacksugar ended up staying in the band, making his debut on 2019's Paradise album.)	2017–2025	guitars; backing vocals	all KMFDM releases from Paradise (2019) to Let Go (2024)

== Touring members ==
Image	Name	Years active	Instruments	Release contributions
	Udo Sturm	1984	keyboards; guitars; bass; drums	none
	Chris Vrenna	1992	drums	none
	Cole Coonce	1992	guitars	none
	Chrissie DeWinter	1992	vocals	Money (1992)
	Mike Jensen	1993–1995	guitars	none
	John DeSalvo	1997	drums	none
	Nivek Ogre	1997	vocals	Symbols (1997); Adios (1999)

== Studio guest appearances ==
Image	Name	Years active	Instruments	Release contributions
	Ton Geist	1984	guitars	Opium (1984)
	Jr. Blackmail	1986; 1988; 1996	vocals	What Do You Know, Deutschland? (1986); Don’t Blow Your Top (1988); Xtort (1996)
	Sigrid Meyer	1988; 1989	vocals	Don't Blow Your Top (1988); UAIOE (1989)
	F.M. Einheit	1989; 1996	production; noises; percussion	UAIOE (1989); Xtort (1996)
	Morgan Adjei	1989	vocals	UAIOE (1989)
	Christine Siewert	1990; 1992; 1993	vocals	Naïve (1990); Money (1992); Angst (1993)
	Johann Bley	1990	drums	Naïve (1990)
	Paul Barker	1990	bass	Naïve (1990)
	William Tucker (died 1999)	1990	guitars	Naïve (1990)
	Dorona Alberti	1992–1996; 2002	vocals	all KMFDM releases from Money (1992) to Xtort (1996); Attak (2002)
	Chris Randall	1992	production; programming	Money (1992)
	Chris Shepard	1993–1999; 2002–2003; 2007; 2009	production; programming	all KMFDM and MDFMK releases from Angst (1993) to WWIII (2003); Tohuvabohu (2007); Blitz (2009)
	Bruce Breckenfeld	1993; 1996; 2022	Hammond B3 organ	Angst (1993); Xtort (1996); Hyëna (2022)
	Jim Christiansen	1995	trombone	Nihil (1995)
	Jeff Olson	1995	trumpet	Nihil (1995)
	Fritz Whitney	1995	bari sax	Nihil (1995)
	Cheryl Wilson	1996; 1999; 2003; 2009; 2019	vocals	Xtort (1996); Adios (1999); WWIII (2003); Blitz (2009); Paradise (2019)
	Chris Connelly	1996	vocals	Xtort (1996)
	Nicole Blackman	1996	vocals	Xtort (1996)
	Bruce Bendinger	1996	voice	Xtort (1996)
	Michael Cichowicz	1996	trumpet	Xtort (1996)
	Steve Finkel	1996	saxophone	Xtort (1996)
	Jack Kramer	1996	trumpet	Xtort (1996)
	Ron Lowe	1996	drill and vacuum cleaner	Xtort (1996)
	Bob Samborski	1996	trombone	Xtort (1996)
	Jon Van Eaton	1996	noise	Xtort (1996)
	Amy Denio	1997; 2007	saxophone; alto saxophone	Symbols (1997); Tohuvabohu (2007)
	Abby Travis	1997	vocals; bass	Symbols (1997)
	Michel Bassin	1997	guitars; percussion	Symbols (1997)
	Frank Chotai	1999	programming	Adios (1999)
	Paul de Carli	1999	digital editing	Adios (1999)
	Nina Hagen	1999	vocals	Adios (1999)
	Curt Golden	2002–2003	slide guitar	Attak (2002); WWIII (2003)
	Arianne Schreiber	2002	vocals	Attak (2002)
	Mona Mur	2003	vocals	WWIII (2003)
	Mina Stolle	2005	trumpet	Hau Ruck (2005)
	Jin Kninja	2007	trumpet	Tohuvabohu (2007)
	Anna Koudriachova	2009	count-up	Blitz (2009)
	William Wilson	2011; 2013; 2014	vocals	WTF?! (2011); Kunst (2013); Our Time Will Come (2014)
	Free Dominguez	2011	vocals	WTF?! (2011)
	Che Eckert	2011	news speak	WTF?! (2011)
	Koichi Fukuda	2011	guitars	WTF?! (2011)
	Sebastian Komor	2011	drum programming; synth production	WTF?! (2011)
	Johann Strauss	2013	vocals; keyboards; drums	Kunst (2013)
	Innocentius Rabiatus	2013	guitar	Kunst (2013)
	Annabella Asia Konietzko	2013	vocals; loops	Kunst (2013)
	Annabella Asia	2014	vocals	Our Time Will Come (2014)
	Bradley Bills	2014	drums	Our Time Will Come (2014)
	Mickie D	2014	guitar	Our Time Will Come (2014)
	Tom Stanzel	2014	bass; composition; drums; engineering; mixing; synthesizer; vocals	Our Time Will Come (2014)
	Doug Wimbish	2017; 2019	bass	Hell Yeah (2017); Paradise (2019)
	Sin Quirin	2017	guitars	Hell Yeah (2017)
	Chris Harms	2017	guitars	Hell Yeah (2017)
	Andrew "Ocelot" Lindsley	2019; 2022; 2024	vocals	Paradise (2019); Hyëna (2022); Let Go (2024)
	Sissy Misfit	2022	vocals	Hyëna (2022)
