= List of KMFDM concert tours =

KMFDM is an industrial music act, founded in 1984 by Sascha Konietzko in Hamburg, Germany. Since then, KMFDM has performed in North America, Europe, Asia, and Australia. KMFDM's earliest performances were as a local act in Hamburg. Their first major tour was in support of Ministry in 1990. Since then, KMFDM has headlined all of their tours, with support from bands such as Sister Machine Gun, Die Warzau, Chemlab, God Lives Underwater, DJ? Acucrack, and Army of the Universe.

The live-band lineup has changed constantly throughout the band's history, with front man Konietzko remaining the only constant on vocals, percussion, and programming. Notable musicians who have contributed to live performances include En Esch, Raymond Watts, Günter Schulz, Chris Vrenna, Nivek Ogre, William Rieflin, Tim Sköld, and Lucia Cifarelli.

On July 12, 2015, Konietzko posted on their official Facebook page that the "Salvation Tour 2015" might be the band's last tour in the United States due to the high taxes the IRS impose to artists.

Duration	Tour name	Band lineup	Location(s) (dates)	Other acts	Source
1989–90	"The Mind is a Terrible Thing to Taste"	Sascha Konietzko (bass, percussion, programming, vocals); En Esch (guitar, vocals); Günter Schulz (guitar); Mark Durante (guitar); Rudolph Naomi (drums)	United States	Headliner: Ministry	
1990	"Naïve"	Sascha Konietzko (bass, percussion, programming, vocals); En Esch (guitar, vocals); Rudolph Naomi (drums); Günter Schulz (guitar)	Europe	With: My Life with the Thrill Kill Kult	
1991	"Split"	Sascha Konietzko (bass, percussion, programming, vocals); En Esch (guitar, percussion, vocals); Günter Schulz (guitar)	United States		
June 1992	"Aloha Jerry Brown"	Sascha Konietzko (bass, percussion, programming, vocals); En Esch (guitar, percussion, vocals); Günter Schulz (guitar); Mark Durante (guitar); Chris Vrenna (drums); Cole Coonce (guitar)	United States		
October–November 1992	"KMFDM Sucks Money"	Sascha Konietzko (bass, percussion, programming, vocals); En Esch (guitar, percussion, vocals); Günter Schulz (guitar); Mark Durante (guitar)	United States	Support: Chainsaw Kittens, Evil Mothers	
1994	"Angstfest"	Sascha Konietzko (bass, percussion, programming, vocals); En Esch (guitar, vocals); Günter Schulz (guitar); Mark Durante (guitar)	United States	Support: Sister Machine Gun, Chemlab	
May 1995	"Beat by Beat"	Sascha Konietzko (bass, percussion, programming, vocals); En Esch (guitar, percussion, vocals); Raymond Watts (vocals); Günter Schulz (guitar); Mark Durante (guitar); Mike Jensen (guitar)	United States	Support: Dink	
Fall 1995	"In Your Face"	Sascha Konietzko (bass, percussion, programming, vocals); En Esch (guitar, percussion, vocals); Raymond Watts (vocals); Günter Schulz (guitar); Mark Durante (guitar); Mike Jensen (guitar)	United States & Europe		
1997	"Symbols"		United States & Europe		
2000	North American tour		United States & Canada	As: MDFMK	
2002	"Sturm & Drang"		United States	Support: 16Volt, Kidneythieves	
2003	"WWIII"		United States	Support: Bile	
2004	"20th Anniversary"		United States, Canada, Europe, Russia, and Australia		
2005	"Hau Ruck"				
2006	"Hau Ruck Zuck USSA"				
2009	"Kein Mitleid"		United States, Canada, & Europe		
2010	"Für Die Mehrheit"		Europe		
August 2011	North American tour		United States & Canada	Support: Army Of The Universe, Human Factors Lab	
Fall 2011	European tour		Europe		
Summer 2012	European tour		Germany, Belgium, France		
March 2013	"USSA 2013"		United States		
April 2013	"Europe 2013"		Europe		
Fall 2013	"We Are KMFDM 2013"		United States & Canada	Support: Chant	
July–August 2015	"Salvation Tour 2015"		United States & Canada	Support: Chant, Black December, Bit Rot, Seven Factor, Inertia	
September 2017	"Rocks UK Tour 2017"		United Kingdom	Support: Lord of the Lost, Inertia	
October 2017	"KMFDM Hell Yeah! 2017 Tour"		United States	Support: Andrew "MC Ocelot" Lindsley, OhGr	
September–October 2022	"US Tour 2022"		United States	Support: Chant	
February–March 2026	"Europe 2026"		Europe	Support: I Ya Toyah, Jesus on Extasy	
