= Noise in Your Head =

Box set by Toyah & The Humans
- Released: 3 July 2020
- Genre: Experimental; rock
- Label: Edsel
- Producer: Bill Rieflin

Toyah & The Humans chronology
| Strange Tales (2014) | Noise in Your Head (2020) |

Noise in Your Head is a four-CD and one-DVD compilation box set by The Humans, fronted by the British singer Toyah Willcox, credited to Toyah & The Humans. It was released in July 2020 by Edsel Records, and consists of the band's three studio albums: We Are the Humans (2009), Sugar Rush (2011) and Strange Tales (2014) with bonus material, a CD with a live concert recorded at the Scala in London in 2010, and a DVD with a live concert recorded at Trading Boundaries near Fletching, East Sussex in 2015 as well as bonus music videos.

Toyah announced the release of the box set via YouTube on 13 June 2020. The set is dedicated to The Humans member Bill Rieflin, who died earlier in 2020, and includes a previously unreleased 7-minute version of the King Crimson classic "21st Century Schizoid Man", one of Rieflin's last recordings. The song was released as a digital single, and Live at Trading Boundaries was released as a separate live album in 2021.

== Track listing ==
=== CD 1: We Are the Humans ===
1. "We Are the Humans"
2. "Is It Wrong"
3. "Twisted Soul"
4. "Telekinesis"
5. "Quicksilver"
6. "Labyrinth"
7. "Icarus"
8. "Noise in Your Head"
9. "This Belongs to You"
10. "Demigod"

Bonus tracks

11. "These Boots Are Made for Walkin'" (feat. Robert Fripp)
12. "We Are the Humans" (Toyah's Home Demo)
13. "Twisted Soul" (Toyah's Home Demo)
14. "Icarus" (Toyah's Home Demo)

=== CD 2: Sugar Rush ===
1. "Titanium Girl"
2. "Love in a Different Way"
3. "Sea of Size"
4. "Pebble"
5. "Small Town Psychopath"
6. "Sweet Agitation"
7. "Playing in the Dark"
8. "Snow at 10:23"
9. "Sugar Rush"
10. "The Reasoning"
11. "Fragment Pool"
12. "Put a Woman on the Moon"

Bonus track

13. "Small Town Psychopath" (Version)

=== CD 3: Strange Tales ===
1. "Slow Descent"
2. "She's Fast"
3. "Get in Your Car"
4. "Amnesia"
5. "Bedhead"
6. "Improbable Thing"
7. "Sleep Tight"

Bonus track

8. "21st Century Schizoid Man"

=== CD 4: Live at Scala London ===
1. "Demigod"
2. "Is It Wrong"
3. "Twisted Soul"
4. "Sugar Rush"
5. "Quicksilver"
6. "Labyrinth"
7. "Icarus"
8. "Noise in Your Head"
9. "Telekinesis"
10. "Sweet Agitation"
11. "Put a Woman on the Moon"
12. "We Are the Humans"
13. "This Belongs to You"
14. "These Boots Are Made for Walkin'"
15. "Purple Haze"

=== DVD: Live at Trading Boundaries ===
1. "Sugar Rush"
2. "Titanium Girl"
3. "Get in Your Car"
4. "Labyrinth"
5. "Amnesia"
6. "Small Town Psychopath"
7. "Telekinesis"
8. "Fragment Pool"
9. "Sea of Size"
10. "These Boots Are Made for Walkin'"
11. "Bedhead"
12. "Is It Wrong"
13. "Quicksilver"
14. "Sleep Tight"
15. "She's Fast"
16. "Pebble"
17. "Slow Descent"
18. "Improbably Thing"
19. "Twisted Soul"
20. "Put a Woman on the Moon"
21. "Demigod"

Bonus videos

1. "We Are the Humans"
2. "Quicksilver"
3. "These Boots Are Made for Walkin'"
4. "Sea of Size"

== Charts ==
| Chart (2020) | Peak position |
|---|---|
| Scottish Albums | 66 |
| UK Album Sales (OCC) | 29 |
| UK Independent Albums | 6 |
