= Krank (song) =

Single by KMFDM
- Released: 8 March 2011
- Recorded: 2010
- Genre: Industrial rock, electro-industrial
- Label: Metropolis, KMFDM, Dependent
- Songwriter(s): Sascha Konietzko
- Producer(s): KMFDM

KMFDM singles chronology
| "Day of Light" (2010) | "Krank" (2011) | "Amnesia" (2012) |

Audio sample
- "Krank": file; help

"Krank" is a song by industrial rock group KMFDM, the first single from their seventeenth studio album, WTF?!. It was released in North America on 8 March 2011 on the KMFDM and Metropolis record labels, and in Europe on 11 March 2011 on the Dependent label. None of the tracks on the Krank release are on the album, as the album features a different version of Krank, and does not feature any version of Day Of Light. The single features remixes by band leader Sascha Konietzko, former band members Tim Skold and Bill Rieflin, and Sebastian Komor of Icon of Coil.

== Cover art ==
The single's cover image was designed by longtime KMFDM cover artist Aidan "Brute!" Hughes, who said that he was asked by band founder Sascha Konietzko to create an illustration of the entire band. He used a variety of photos from the band's last tour and individually sketched all the band members before layering them together to create a caricatured group image.

== Video ==
The band released a video for the song, their first in nine years, and first official video since 1997's "Megalomaniac" video. The video, which was simultaneously recorded in Seattle, Hamburg, and Portland, Oregon, was produced by Kelly Raine. The band released a teaser for the video a few weeks before the release of the single, which was then temporarily sold out on the band's website due to high demand.

== Reception ==
"Krank" has been generally well received. The song was described as "adrenalin-pumping" and "self-assured" by Ross Hoon of Dominion Magazine. Mike Kieffer of Auxiliary Magazine called the single "nothing groundbreaking, yet still good", adding that the single hinted that the upcoming album WTF?! could be great. Niggels Uhlenbruch of Reflections of Darkness called the song "an aggressive stomper in the best KMFDM tradition", but also commented that it was "a bit like KMFDM by numbers". He described the mixes of the song as ready for club play.

In its second week of release, the song "Krank" reached No. 5 on the DAC German Alternative Chart. It also reached No. 15 on the US Billboard Top 100 Singles Chart and No. 3 on the US Billboard Top 25 Dance Singles Chart.

== Track listing ==
| No. | Title | Writer(s) | Remixer | Length |
|---|---|---|---|---|
| 1. | "Krank (Käptn' K Mix)" | Sascha Konietzko | Sascha Konietzko | 4:23 |
| 2. | "Krank (Komor Kommando Mix)" | Konietzko | Sebastian Komor | 4:55 |
| 3. | "Krank (Knark Mix)" | Konietzko | Tim Skold | 4:36 |
| 4. | "Day of Light (Revenge Mix)" | Jules Hodgson, Konietzko, William Wilson | Bill Rieflin | 4:23 |
| 5. | "Day of Light (24/7 Mix)" | Hodgson, Konietzko, Wilson | | 5:00 |
| Total length: | | | | 23:17 |

== Personnel ==
=== Musicians ===
- Lucia Cifarelli – vocals
- Jules Hodgson – guitars
- Sascha Konietzko – vocals (1–3), drums, programming, production, mixing
- Steve White – guitars
- William Wilson – vocals (4–5)

=== Additional personnel ===
- Annabella Asia Konietzko – vocals (4–5)
- Don Gunn – engineering
- Sebastian Komor – mixing (2)
- Bill Rieflin – mixing (3)
- Tim Skold – mixing (4)
