= From the Land of Volcanos =

From the Land of Volcanoes

Studio album by Lucia Cifarelli
- Released: May 3, 2003
- Genre: Alternative rock, electronic rock
- Length: 54:16
- Label: Universal Records, The Control Group
- Producer: Lucia Cifarelli

From the Land of Volcanos is the debut solo album by Drill and KMFDM veteran Lucia Cifarelli.

Professional ratings
Review scores
Source	Rating
Allmusic	3/5 stars

== Releases ==
- The Control Group CGO 014 - CD

== Track listing ==
1. "So Clever" - 3:59
2. "I Don't Care" - 3:58
3. "Northern Star" - 4:06
4. "Fear" - 4:53
5. "Feels Like Summer" - 4:29
6. "What You Become" - 4:04
7. "We Are Angels" - 4:06
8. "Who Asked You" - 4:52
9. "I Will" - 4:26
10. "Monkey Puzzle Tree" - 3:49
11. "Little Rose" - 4:02
12. "Ordinary Girl" - 4:22
13. "Monkey Puzzle Tree" (KMFDM version) - 3:10

Total playing time: 54:16

== Personnel ==
- Jim Barton – production (9), recording (9), mixing (9), engineering (9)
- Dave Bascombe – mixing (3, 7)
- Dave Bassett – Writing (1)
- Eric Bazilian – Co-production (7), recording (7), guitars (7), drums (7), bass (7)
- Lucia Cifarelli – writing, vocals, backing vocals
- Maren Costa – design
- Charles Van Devender – acoustic guitar (9)
- Marc Fox – percussion (1, 3–5)
- Kevin Gallagher – recording (10–12)
- Toni Gillis – mastering (at The Hit Factory, NYC)
- Martin Green – arrangement (4)
- Reg Gwynedd – bass (1, 2)
- Simon Hanson – drums (10, 12)
- Dan Harnett – writing (2, 9), guitars (9)
- Matt Hay – programming (1–8, 10–12)
- Jules Hodgson – guitars (13)
- Clare Kenny – bass (3–5)
- Jon Klein – writing (10), guitars (1, 2, 10–12)
- Sascha Konietzko – writing (6, 8, 11, 12), co-production (6, 8, 11, 12), guitars (6, 11), percussion (6, 11), bass (6, 8, 11), drums (8, 11), synthesizer (13), programming (6, 8, 11, 12), additional drum loops (9)
- Eric Kupper – writing (9)
- Julian Leaper – violins (4)
- Patrick Leonard – writing (3, 4)
- Devan McClure – hair
- Heidi Nymark – makeup
- PCA Photography – photography
- William "Bill" Rieflin – writing (8), bass (12)
- Chuck Sabo – drums (1–4, 6, 7)
- Andy Selway – drums (13)
- Julie Simon – writing (7), backing vocals (7)
- Brian Sperber – mixing (5)
- Ian Stanley – production (1–8, 10–12), recording (1–8, 10–12), keyboards, programming (1–8, 10–12)
- Neil Taylor – guitars (1–5, 8)
- Mark Taylor – piano (4)
- Patrick Thrasher – engineering (9), additional drum loops (9)
- Cenzo Townshend – recording (1–6, 8), mixing (1, 2, 4, 6, 8, 10–12)
- Brent Zius – project coordinator
