= MDFMK (disambiguation) =

MDFMK is an industrial rock band formed by Sascha Konietzko and Tim Skold of KMFDM after it disbanded in 1999.

It may also refer to:

- MDFMK (album), a 2000 studio album released by MDFMK.
- MDFMK (EP), a 1998 EP released by KMFDM featuring mixes of songs from their Symbols album.
