= Brimborium =

Remix album by KMFDM
- Released: 19 February 2008
- Genre: Industrial rock, electro-industrial
- Length: 73:07
- Label: Metropolis Records/KMFDM Records
- Producer: KMFDM

KMFDM remix album chronology
Ruck Zuck (2006)	Brimborium (2008)	Krieg (2010)

Professional ratings
Review scores
Source	Rating
Allmusic	2/5 stars
ReGen Magazine	5/5 stars
Cosmos Gaming	unfavorable

Brimborium is a remix album by the industrial rock band KMFDM. It was released on 19 February 2008.

It features remixes of several tracks from 2007's Tohuvabohu, one remix from Hau Ruck, and the new track "What We Do for You", which consists of voice messages from the KMFDM Fan Phone and whose title references the band's 1993 hit, "Light".

"Brimborium" is a German word meaning "hoo-ha", "mumbo-jumbo", or "rigmarole".

The background drop zone in the artwork by Aidan Hughes was based using an old street map on his home town of New Brighton.

== Track listing ==
No.	Title	Length
1.	"Tohuvabohu (MS-20 Mix by Combichrist)"	4:46
2.	"Looking for Strange (Super Strange Mix by Die Krupps)"	5:28
3.	"Superpower (Buttfunk Mix by Käpt'n K.)"	4:13
4.	"Headcase (Hallowe'en Remix by Jules Hodgson)"	4:24
5.	"Tohuvabohu (Ex Nihilo Mix by Angelspit)"	4:45
6.	"I Am What I Am (The One and Only Mix by Steve White)"	6:26
7.	"Looking for Strange (All Strung Up Mix by Velox Music)"	6:30
8.	"Saft und Kraft (Saft und Crack Mix by DJ? Acucrack)"	5:47
9.	"Not in My Name (Check Yourself Mix by 16Volt)"	5:40
10.	"Headcase (Fix Mix by Angelspit)"	4:14
11.	"Spit or Swallow (Electric Stomp Mix by Velox Music)"	4:54
12.	"You're No Good (Zomb'd Out Mix by Zombie Girl)"	6:46
13.	"What We Do for You"	9:14
14.	"Looking for Strange (Underbelly Remix by Violet Corporation)" (downloadable with Brimborium preorder)	5:23
