= Zilch =

Zilch means "nothing" or "zero". Zilch may also refer to:

- Zilch (company), a British payment services company
- Zilch (software), a compiler used by Infocom to create Z-machine games
- Zilch (electromagnetism), a group of conserved quantities of the electromagnetic field
- Zilch, an alternative name for the dice game Farkle
- Zilch: The Power of Zero in Business, a book by Nancy Lublin
- Zilch!, a New Zealand film

== In music ==
- Zilch (band), a Japanese American rock band
- Sonicflood, an American Christian band formerly known as Zilch
- "Zilch" (song), a song from the 1967 Monkees album Headquarters
- Zilch, the working name for the 2011 KMFDM album WTF?!
- Zilch (album)
