= Kunst (album) =

Studio album by KMFDM
- Released: 26 February 2013
- Recorded: Hamburg, Germany; Seattle, Washington, US
- Genres: Industrial rock, electro-industrial
- Length: 46:45
- Label: Metropolis/KMFDM
- Producer: Sascha Konietzko

KMFDM chronology
WTF?! (2011)	Kunst (2013)	Our Time Will Come (2014)

Kunst (German for "art") is the 17th album by industrial band KMFDM. It was released on 26 February 2013 on Metropolis Records.

== Background ==
Kunst features contributions from guest musician William Wilson and Swedish band Morlocks. The album cover was designed by longtime KMFDM cover artist Aidan "Brute!" Hughes. He said the album cover, a "chainsaw-wielding amazon", which Facebook removed from KMFDM's page, was created to support Russian punk rock group Pussy Riot and Ukrainian protest group FEMEN. The song "Pussy Riot" was also written in support of the former.

== Release ==
Kunst was released on 26 February 2013 on Metropolis Records. The title track was made available on SoundCloud on 21 November 2012.

== Reception ==
Professional ratings
Review scores
Source	Rating
AllMusic	4/5 stars
COMA Music Magazine	Favorable

== Track listing ==
No.	Title	Length
1.	"Kunst"	5:01
2.	"Ave Maria"	5:02
3.	"Quake"	4:07
4.	"Hello"	4:25
5.	"Next Big Thing"	4:41
6.	"Pussy Riot"	4:10
7.	"Pseudocide"	3:36
8.	"Animal Out"	5:06
9.	"The Mess You Made"	6:05
10.	"I <3 Not"	4:32
Total length:		46:45

== Personnel ==
- Sascha Konietzko – vocals (1–8, 10), guitar (10), bass, synthesizer, drums (1–3, 6–10), loops (1, 3, 4, 6, 9, 10), recording, production, mixing
- Lucia Cifarelli – vocals (1, 2, 4, 6, 8), production
- Jules Hodgson – guitar (1–9), bass (7), drums (6, 7), recording
- Andy Selway – drums (4, 5)

=== Additional personnel ===
- William Wilson – vocals (5), recording
- Johann Strauss – vocals (9), keyboards (9), drums (9)
- Innocentius Rabiatus – guitar (9)
- Annabella Asia Konietzko – vocals (10), loops (7)
- Brian Gardner – mastering
