= WTF?! =

Studio album by KMFDM
- Released: April 26, 2011
- Recorded: Hamburg, Germany; Seattle, Washington, U.S.
- Genres: Industrial rock, electro-industrial
- Length: 50:49
- Label: Metropolis/KMFDM
- Producer: Sascha Konietzko

KMFDM chronology
Blitz (2009)	WTF?! (2011)	Kunst (2013)

WTF?! is the 16th studio album by German industrial band KMFDM, released on April 26, 2011, on KMFDM Records and Metropolis Records. The regular line-up of Sascha Konietzko, Lucia Cifarelli, Jules Hodgson, Andy Selway, and Steve White was joined by a handful of musicians from other industrial and alternative metal acts. The album took about twice as long as usual for the band to produce, and underwent a significant amount of modification during its recording.

WTF?! reached No. 8 on Billboard's Dance/Electronic Albums chart. Its first single, "Krank", hit No. 15 on the Billboard Singles chart, while its second, "Amnesia", hit No. 3 on the Deutsche Alternative Charts. Critics were generally very positive about the album, and while some felt the album was relatively creative, most felt it stayed close to the same formula the band had used for years.

== Background ==
Band leader Sascha Konietzko first mentioned a new album that would feature "a slew of guest musicians" in March 2010. Former collaborator Bill Rieflin returned to help with WTF?!, and Koichi Fukuda also added guitar work. William Wilson, who had previously performed vocals on "Day of Light", and Free Dominguez, of the group Kidneythieves, were brought in as guest vocalists for one song apiece. In an interview in September 2010, Konietzko said the new album would be named Zilch. A remixed version of "Rebels in Control" was made available on the band's website in December 2010 as a show of support for WikiLeaks editor-in-chief Julian Assange, and was streamed more than 75,000 times in two days. The name of the forthcoming album was also revealed to have been changed to WTF?! around the same time.

== Production ==
Konietzko explained in an April 2011 interview that the album had taken fourteen months to complete, about twice as long as usual. He said that everything on the album "went through a grinder, was then re-constituted and went through a whole process of re-birthing yet once again", adding that every single component of the album was redone at least once. Konietzko also commented before the album's release that due to the significant time difference between his location (Hamburg, Germany) and the rest of the band (on the United States west coast), "I take my rest and they work, so it's like we get two full work days in a 24 hour frame."

The song "Panzerfaust" marks the first time the band has written a song with Italian lyrics, and is a translation of "Liebeslied" from the band's 1990 album Naïve. The song "Death and Burial of C.R." is lyrically based on the English nursery rhyme "Who Killed Cock Robin". The song "Vive La Mort!" includes the lyrics "aces and eights", a reference to Wild Bill Hickok's last hand.

== Release ==
"Krank"
"Krank", the "adrenalin-pumping" first single from WTF?!.

The concept for the album cover was conceived jointly by Konietzko and longtime band associate and cover artist Aidan "Brute!" Hughes. Hughes stated that he achieved an appearance similar to the angelic look of Renaissance paintings of the Madonna with the artwork.

The album's first single, "Krank", was released March 8, 2011, and debuted at No. 15 on the Billboard Singles Chart. WTF?! was released on April 26, 2012, and reached No. 8 on Billboard's Dance/Electronic Albums chart on May 14, 2011. It also debuted at No. 1 on the iTunes Electronic Album chart. The song "Amnesia" was released as a single on May 22, 2012. It peaked at No. 3 on the Deutsche Alternative Charts in mid-July.

The band toured North America in support of the album in August 2011, with Wilson accompanying the band as a guest vocalist. A longer tour of Europe took place in October and November.

== Reception ==
Professional ratings
Review scores
Source	Rating
AllMusic	4/5 stars
COMA Music Magazine	favorable
FearNet	favorable
Magnetic	favorable
Reflections of Darkness	favorable
ReGen Magazine	3.5/5 stars
Sputnikmusic	3.5/5 stars

WTF?! received very positive reviews, with critics split over whether the album broke new ground compared to previous releases. Some felt the album explored new musical territory. Trey Spencer of Sputnikmusic praised the album and the band's creativity, saying KMFDM had "stepped outside of their comfort zone by ... opening up to a little experimentation." William Dashiell Hammett of COMA Music Magazine was strongly complimentary, saying, "The level of musicianship and creativity shown on this album is breathtaking."

Most critics felt KMFDM stayed close to its usual sound on WTF?!. David Jeffries of AllMusic commented, "The 'ultra heavy beat' sounds as 'ultra' and 'heavy' as ever on WTF?!" He went on to say the album was "an outstanding blast of dark dancefloor destruction" and saying the album should be on "the top shelf". Gregory Burkart of FearNet mostly praised the album, saying that while the band doesn't "break new creative ground" on WTF?!, which he said wasn't the "heaviest, fastest or most experimental album", it was "still rock-solid, sporting some outstanding melodies and rhythms, and many memorable moments". Ilker Yücel of ReGen Magazine called WTF?! a "hard-hitting dose of industrial rock that is as familiar as it is unusual". He concluded his review by saying, "In short, it’s KMFDM by-the-numbers, and after 27 years, that's not a bad thing at all." Mark von Pfeiffer of Magnetic said, "WTF? is typical: electronic used to augment electric to over-human speeds and volumes, outrageous claims made in the 3rd-person". He also thought the album was more accessible, saying, "This is industrial, but edible for most anyone looking for a bit of roughage on their playlist." Petra Whiteley of Reflections of Darkness called WTF?! "a solid release bursting with power and determination". She also said of KMFDM, "musically they are not far of their centre and typical sound, which is not a bad thing".

== Track listing ==
All tracks are written by Sascha Konietzko unless otherwise indicated.

No.	Title	Writer(s)	Length
1.	"Krank"		5:11
2.	"Come On – Go Off"		4:18
3.	"Rebels in Kontrol"	Sascha Konietzko, Lucia Cifarelli	4:45
4.	"Lynchmob"	Cifarelli, Jules Hodgson	4:56
5.	"Take It Like a Man"	Konietzko, Cifarelli	3:50
6.	"Vive la Mort!"	Konietzko, Steve White	4:07
7.	"Dystopia"	Konietzko, Cifarelli	4:57
8.	"Panzerfaust"		4:10
9.	"Spectre"	Konietzko, William Wilson	4:10
10.	"Amnesia"	Konietzko, Cifarelli	5:05
11.	"Death & Burial of C. R."		5:20
Total length:			50:49

== Personnel ==
All credits come from 2011 liner notes.

=== Band members ===
- Sascha Konietzko – vocals, synthesizers, programming, drum programming (1–3, 5, 7–11), party balloon solo (3), bass (3, 7–8, 11), guitars (9), feedback guitar (7), metal percussion (9)
- Lucia Cifarelli – vocals
- Jules Hodgson – guitars, synths (3), all programming and instruments (4), drum programming (5)
- Andy Selway – drums
- Steve White – guitars, drum programming (6), synths (6), bass (9), keyboards (9)

=== Additional personnel ===
- Free Dominguez – vocals (5)
- Che Eckert – news speak (3)
- Michael "Quirk" Dorsett – digitar (7)
- Koichi Fukuda – guitar (2)
- Sebastian Komor – drum programming (3, 10), synth production (3, 10)
- Bill Rieflin – nervous chatter (7), jaw shivers (7)
- William Wilson – vocals (9)
- Frank De Wulf – TB-303 riff (1)

=== Production ===
- Sascha Konietzko – production, mixing
- Jules Hodgson – mixing
- Brian Gardner – mastering
- Brute! – artwork
- Justin Gammon – layout
- Vibrent Management – post production coordination
