= Amnesia (KMFDM song) =

Single by KMFDM
- Released: 22 May 2012
- Recorded: 2011
- Genre: Electro-industrial, industrial metal, future pop
- Label: Metropolis, dependent, KMFDM
- Songwriter(s): Sascha Konietzko, Lucia Cifarelli
- Producer(s): KMFDM

KMFDM singles chronology
"Krank" (2011)	"Amnesia" (2012)	"Salvation" (2015)

"Amnesia" is a song by industrial band KMFDM from their album WTF?! It was released as a single on 22 May 2012 in North America and on 25 May 2012 in Europe.

== Reception ==
"Amnesia" has been favorably described as "highly danceable", a "club buster", and a "hellish groover".

== Artwork ==
The cover image for the single was designed by long-time KMFDM associate Aidan "Brute!" Hughes. It was initially conceived by band leader Sascha Konietzko, and is inspired by the Edvard Munch painting The Scream.

== Track listing ==
No.	Title	Writer(s)	Remixer	Length
1.	"Amnesia (Käpt'n K. Mix)"	Sascha Konietzko, Lucia Cifarelli	Sascha Konietzko	5:47
2.	"Amnesia (Album Mix)"	Konietzko, Cifarelli		5:01
3.	"Krank (Morlocks Mix)"	Konietzko	Morlocks	5:26
4.	"Come On – Go Off (Rotersand Mix)"	Konietzko	Rotersand	4:40
5.	"I ❤ You"	Konietzko		3:53
Total length:				24:47
