= Blitz (KMFDM album) =

Studio album by KMFDM
- Released: March 24, 2009
- Genres: Industrial rock, electro-industrial
- Length: 52:26
- Label: Metropolis Records/KMFDM Records
- Producer: KMFDM

KMFDM chronology
Tohuvabohu (2007)	Blitz (2009)	WTF?! (2011)

Blitz is German industrial rock group KMFDM's 15th studio album, released on March 24, 2009, on KMFDM Records and Metropolis Records. It also marks the first use of five letter song titles and a five letter album title since WWIII. The album charted after its release, as did the song "People of the Lie". Blitz had songs written in three different languages, and was moderately well received by critics. Most of its songs were remixed for the band's next release, Krieg.

== Background ==
The symbol used for the first track,, is a variation of the astronomical symbol for the planet Uranus,. Sascha Konietzko, the band's founder, mentions the lyrics "Up Uranus" in his blog, and at the place of the symbol in lyrics, "up Uranus" is sung. "Bait and Switch" contains lyrics from "Hark! The Herald Angels Sing". The lyrics for "Davai" are Russian, while the lyrics for "Potz Blitz!" are German. The track "Me & My Gun" is a song loosely about the Columbine shooters, Eric Harris and Dylan Klebold.

== Release ==
Blitz was released on March 24, 2009. It was on Billboard's Dance/Electronic Albums Chart for four weeks, and peaked at No. 9. It reached No. 1 on the CMJ Loud Rock Select chart and No. 15 on the FMQB Metal Detector chart. "People of the Lie" reached No. 1 for three weeks on CMJ's Loud Rock Select Tracks chart.

== Reception ==
Professional ratings
Review scores
Source	Rating
Allmusic	3.5/5 stars
PopMatters	5/10 stars
ReGen Magazine	4.5/5 stars
Sputnikmusic	3/4 stars

Blitz received mixed to positive reviews.

== Track listing ==
No.	Title	Writer(s)	Length
1.	" (Up Uranus)"	Sascha Konietzko	4:04
2.	"Bait & Switch"	Lucia Cifarelli, Konietzko	5:56
3.	"Davai"	Konietzko	4:30
4.	"Never Say Never"	Cifarelli, Jules Hodgson, Konietzko	4:19
5.	"Potz Blitz!"	Hodgson, Konietzko	4:23
6.	"People of the Lie"	Cifarelli, Konietzko	4:53
7.	"Being Boiled" (The Human League cover)	Martyn Ware, Ian Craig Marsh, Philip Oakey	4:07
8.	"Strut"	Cifarelli, Konietzko, Andy Selway	5:30
9.	"Bitches"	Konietzko	4:23
10.	"Me & My Gun"	Cifarelli, Konietzko	3:30
11.	"Take'm Out"	Konietzko	6:51
Total length:			52:26

== Personnel ==
All information from 2009 liner notes.

=== Musicians ===
- Lucia Cifarelli – vocals (1, 2, 4–6, 8, 10)
- Jules Hodgson – guitar (1–4, 6–10), drum programming (4), drum enhancement (9, 10), all instruments (5), production (1–10), mixing
- Sascha Konietzko – vocals (1–7, 9–11), analog synthesizers (1–4, 6–10), drum programming (1–4, 6–10), sitar (4), loops (7), P-Funk bass (8), all instruments (11), production, mixing
- Tim Skold – bass (1, 9), cymbals and hi-hats (1–4, 6, 9, 10), drum enhancement (1, 4, 8), drum sound design (2, 3, 6, 9, 10), Soviet synth (6, 8, 9), production (1–4, 6, 8–10)

=== Additional personnel ===
- Anna Koudriachova – countup (3)
- Andy Selway – digital synthesizers (8), drum programming (8)
- Steve White – guitar (8)
- Cheryl Wilson – vocals (8)

=== Production ===
- Brian Gardner – mastering
- Brute! – cover art
- Justin Gammon – layout
- Kirk Edward Mitchell – photography
- Vibrent Management – post production coordination
