= Day of Light =

Single by KMFDM
- B-side: "Beach"
- Released: 1 February 2010
- Genre: Industrial
- Length: 8:33
- Label: KMFDM Records
- Songwriter(s): Sascha Konietzko, William John Wilson
- Producer(s): KMFDM

KMFDM singles chronology
"'Boots'" (2002)	"Day of Light" (2010)	"Krank" (2011)

"Day of Light" is a song by industrial rock band KMFDM that was first released on 1 February 2010, on 7" vinyl, and was limited to 250 copies that sold out in less than 36 hours. The title track on side A features vocals by William Wilson of Legion Within, a band with whom KMFDM frontman Sascha Konietzko worked on two albums. The B-side is an instrumental track. Both tracks were made available for download as mp3s from the KMFDM online store on 13 March 2010, and "Day of Light" was included, along with a remix, on the "Krank" single.

== Track listing ==
No.	Title	Length
1.	"Day of Light"	5:00
2.	"Beach"	3:33
Total length:		8:33

== Personnel ==
- Sascha Konietzko – vocals, synthesizers, programming, drums, percussion
- Lucia Cifarelli – vocals, programming
- Jules Hodgson – guitar, bass, programming
- William Wilson – vocals
