= Adios (KMFDM album) =

Studio album by KMFDM
- Released: April 20, 1999
- Recorded: 1998
- Genres: Electro-industrial; club; industrial metal
- Length: 49:54
- Label: Wax Trax!/TVT
- Producers: Sascha Konietzko, Tim Skold, Chris Shepard

KMFDM chronology
Symbols (1997)	Adios (1999)	Attak (2002)

Adios is the tenth studio album released by German industrial band KMFDM. The album was originally conceived as the group's parting shot to its longtime record label, Wax Trax! Records, but it ended up also signaling the break-up of KMFDM itself until the band reformed in 2002. Recorded in Seattle, Washington, this was the last album to feature En Esch and Günter Schulz, who both went on to form Slick Idiot. Following the break-up, founding member Sascha Konietzko created the band MDFMK, before reforming KMFDM in 2002 without Esch or Schulz.

The album was released on April 20, 1999, the same date the Columbine High School massacre took place. Eric Harris and Dylan Klebold, the two perpetrators of the massacre, were both avid KMFDM fans. Eric Harris noted the coincidence of the album's title and release date in his journal.

A digitally remastered reissue of Adios was released on May 8, 2007, along with the digitally remastered reissue of Symbols.

== Background ==
The 1990s core of KMFDM (Sascha Konietzko, En Esch, and Günter Schulz) had reunited for the previous album, Symbols, and toured together along with fellow German industrial metal band Rammstein in 1997. The core line-up was joined on tour by John DeSalvo, Nivek Ogre, and Tim Sköld. Adios was written almost entirely by Konietzko and Sköld, who became an official member for the band's final release with Wax Trax! Records. Schulz, who had done significant writing for the previous five albums, acted only as a studio musician, while Esch helped write only a pair of songs. It was originally intended to be released in 1998 but was pushed back by the record label as the "rarities" compilation album AGOGO was offered up instead. KMFDM had already disbanded by the time of its eventual release.

== Release date controversy ==
Adios was released on April 20, 1999, which coincided with the Columbine High School massacre and Adolf Hitler's birthday. Because Eric Harris and Dylan Klebold were big fans of the group, KMFDM released an official statement denouncing the violence, sympathizing with the victims and their families, and explaining that the band had no Nazi affiliations whatsoever.

== Reception ==
Professional ratings
Review scores
Source	Rating
AllMusic	2.5/5 stars
CMJ New Music Report	positive
PopMatters	8/10 stars
Release	9/10 stars

Adios received positive reviews. Gina Boldman of AllMusic said of the album: "KMFDM sound smoother yet maintain their emotive mayhem in all its glory." The staff of PopMatters called Adios a "superb mix of the anarchaic fueled fury of the 80’s and a full awareness of what their genre has become." Remarking on the band's then-disbandment, they further stated that KMFDM "left us with something to remember them by." Amy Sciarretto of CMJ New Music Report said that Adios "continues in the group's grand tradition of techno-informed, industrial-fueled beat manipulation". She said the beats, guitars, and female vocals formed "an electrifying chemistry", concluding, "Adios is a satisfying sendoff for KMFDM and its legion of fans."

== Track listing ==
All tracks are written by Sascha Konietzko and Tim Skold, unless otherwise noted.

No.	Title	Length
1.	"Adios"	3:56
2.	"Sycophant"	5:13
3.	"D.I.Y."	4:51
4.	"Today"	4:57
5.	"Witness" (Konietzko, Skold, Nina Hagen)	7:23
6.	"R.U.OK?"	4:46
7.	"That's All" (Konietzko, Skold, Nivek Ogre, En Esch)	5:08
8.	"Full Worm Garden" (Konietzko, Skold, Ogre, William Rieflin)	5:03
9.	"Rubicon"	3:44
10.	"Bereit" (Konietzko, Skold, Esch)	4:53
Total length:		49:54

== Personnel ==
- Sascha Konietzko – vocals (1–3, 6–10), synths, programming (1–10), guitar (10)
- Tim Skold – vocals (1–4, 6–10), programming (1–10), bass (9)
- Günter Schulz – guitar (1–3, 7, 9, 10)
- Cheryl Wilson – vocals (2, 4, 7–9)
- En Esch – hi-hat & cymbals (2), vocals (3, 7, 10), add. programming (7)
- Frank Chotai – add. programming (4)
- Paul de Carli – digital editing (4)
- Nina Hagen – vocals (5, 10)
- Nivek Ogre – vocals (7, 8)
- William Rieflin – programming (8)
