= Ruck Zuck =

Ruck Zuck may refer to:

- Ruck Zuck (EP), a 2006 remix album by industrial musical group KMFDM
- Ruck Zuck (game show), a German game show that ran from 1988 to 2000
- "Ruckzuck", a song by German techno musical group Kraftwerk from their 1970 eponymous debut album
- Mannlicher M1895, nicknamed the Ruck-Zuck or Ruck-Zuck-Gewehr by Austrian soldiers
