= Morlocks (Swedish band) =

Swedish alternative rock band

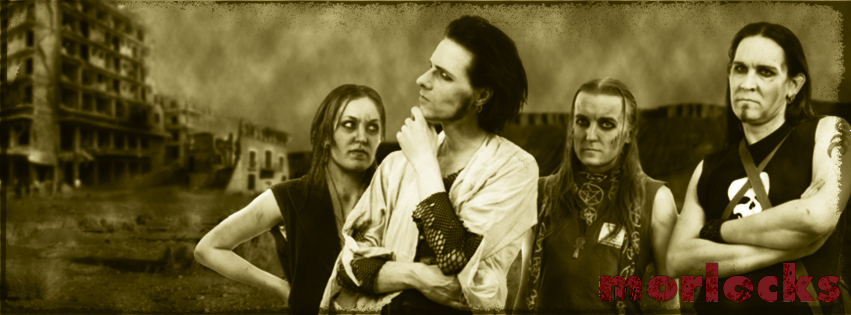
- Morlocks in 2013

Background information
- Origin: Gothenburg, Västergötland, Sweden
- Genres: Industrial rock; electro-industrial; Neoclassical
- Years active: 1990–1993; 1997–2002; 2003–present
- Labels: Nangijala Records; Echozone; Metropolis Records
- Members: Innocentius Rabiatus
- Past members: Johann Strauss (deceased); Kya Wolfwritten; Cavenus; N.M.D. (This refers to Niklas, a founding member)
- Website: www.morlocks.net

Morlocks is an alternative and industrial rock band formed in Gothenburg, Sweden, in the early 1990s by Johann Strauss and Н.М.Д.

== History ==
Morlocks's first demo cassette, They're Not Human, was released in 1991. The release combined electronic body music and ambient music elements. Morlocks disbanded in 1993, but re-formed in 1997 with a different lineup.

In 1998, the band released their demo Through the Waking World, featuring a different sound that ranged from guitar-based electronic music to medieval-influenced pieces, orchestral parts, and synth-pop. This demo led to a record deal with Nangijala Records. Morlocks's debut album on the Nangijala label, ...For Your Pleasure?, was released in 2001; it contained several reworked tracks from Through the Waking World.

Morlocks performed at several Swedish clubs; internal disagreements over creative direction and album production, however, would lead to the band's breakup. The single "Non Trigger Man" was released in 2002, after which the group disbanded.

Main composer, lead vocalist, and founding member Johann Strauss (stage name of Johan Fridh) re-formed the band shortly after the split, inviting Logos (keyboardist from the recently disbanded death metal band Nightshade), along with Innocentius Rabiatus (formerly known as VigilAnte, the ex-guitarist of the gothic rock act Dark Side, Cowboys). The new lineup shifted the band's sound toward industrial rock and metal music with orchestral arrangements.

In 2010, the band performed at the Parkbühne Wuhlheide venue at Wave Gotik Treffen in Leipzig, Germany, as well as at the ElektroStat Festival in Oslo, Norway, and held a summer tour in Finland alongside the Finnish gothic metal act Vergil. In 2011, Morlocks self-released their album The Outlaw of Fives, marking a thematic shift toward Steampunk aesthetics and Discordian philosophy.

In 2011, Morlocks were contacted by the German industrial rock band KMFDM, whose members had heard some of Morlocks' demo recordings. After subsequent correspondence, a collaboration began. The first result was a Morlocks mix of "Krank", which appeared with the single "Amnesia" (Metropolis Records) in 2012. The song "The Mess You Made" was co-written by Sascha Konietzko and Morlocks and appeared on KMFDM's 2013 album Kunst, featuring lead vocals by Strauss and guitars by Innocentius Rabiatus and Jules Hodgson.

After signing with the German label Echozone in 2012, The Outlaw of Fives was re-released and distributed across Europe.

In 2013, bass player, vocalist, and multi-instrumentalist Lamashtu joined the band. Later that year, Morlocks appeared on the compilation Their Music, Our Lives, a tribute to the Slovenian band Borghesia, covering their song "Young Prisoner". In 2018, they also recorded a cover version of "The Lake" (originally released by the Swedish black metal band Bathory in 1996), arranged in Morlocks' neo-classical/industrial style.

In 2021, during the global lockdown caused by the COVID-19 pandemic, Morlocks, now a trio, wrote new material and recorded their third album, Praise the Iconoclast. The album, featuring guest vocals by Karin My, Heljarmadr of Grá/Dark Funeral, and longtime collaborator Sascha Konietzko, was completed in early 2023 and released through the American label Metropolis Records in October, 2023. A video for the song "Dicks in Tanks" (featuring Heljarmadr) was released on YouTube as a promotional single.

In 2024, Morlocks joined KMFDM as a supporting act on the latter's 40th anniversary tour in the United States. Following the tour, Lamashtu left the group.

Founding member and lead vocalist Johann Strauss died on March 1, 2026.

== Line up ==
=== Current members ===
- Innocentius Rabiatus – lead guitar, backing vocals, keyboards (2003–present)

=== Former members ===
- Н.М.Д. – lead vocals, keyboards (1990–1993)
- L. Turtle – lead vocals, lyrics (1991–1993)
- Napoleon – keyboards, percussion (1991–2002)
- Jenan – lead guitar, backing vocals (1998–2002)
- I van Ish – drums, keyboards (1997–2001)
- Cavenus – lead vocals (2004–2008)
- Kya Wolfwritten – lead vocals (2009–2010)
- Logos – rhythm guitar, backing vocals, keyboards (2003–2015)
- Lamashtu – bass, backing vocals (2013–2024)
- Reverend Grudge – rhythm guitar (2021–2024, live only)
- Johann Strauss – lead vocals, keyboards, trumpet (1990–2026)

== Discography ==
- They're Not Human (demo, 1991)
- Through the Waking World (demo, 1998)
- ...For Your Pleasure? (album, Nangijala Records, 2001)
- "Non Trigger Man" (single, Nangijala Records, 2002)
- The Outlaw of Fives (album, Non Aligned Media/Echozone, 2011)
- Praise the Iconoclast (album, Metropolis Records, 2023)
- Amor, Monstra et Horrore Profundi (mini-album, Metropolis Records, 2024)
