= Dirty bomb (disambiguation) =

A dirty bomb is a speculative radiological weapon.

Dirty Bomb may also refer to:

- Dirty Bomb (video game), a video game developed by Splash Damage
- Dirty Bomb (album), an album by KGC
- Dirty Bomb (film), a Finnish film
