= Let Go (KMFDM album) =

Studio album by KMFDM
- Released: 2 February 2024
- Genre: Electro-industrial, industrial rock, industrial metal
- Length: 43:57
- Label: Metropolis

KMFDM chronology
Hyëna (2022)	Let Go (2024)	Enemy (2026)

Let Go is the 22nd studio album by German industrial band KMFDM. It was released on 2 February 2024, the month of the fortieth anniversary of the band. Music videos for the songs "Airhead" and "Let Go" were released on YouTube in the weeks prior to the album's release. The album features a guest appearance and verse by rapper MC Ocelot.

== Track listing ==
No.	Title	Writer(s)	Length
1.	"Let Go"	Andee Blacksugar, Lucia Cifarelli, Sascha Konietzko, Andy Selway	4:12
2.	"Push!"	Blacksugar, Cifarelli, Konietzko, Selway	4:34
3.	"Next Move"	Blacksugar, Cifarelli, Andrew Lindsley, Konietzko	5:09
4.	"Airhead"	Blacksugar, Cifarelli, Konietzko, Selway	4:41
5.	"Turn the Light On"	Blacksugar, Konietzo	5:02
6.	"Touch"	Blacksugar, Cifarelli, Konietzko	4:23
7.	"Erlkönig"	Konietzko	4:17
8.	"When the Bell Tolls"	Blacksugar, Cifarelli, Konietzko	3:26
9.	"Totem E. Eggs"	Blacksugar, Selway, Konietzko	3:54
10.	"WW 2023"	Cifarelli, Konietzko, Selway	3:30
11.	"Fillet Manchego Claret & Blow"	Konietzko	0:49
Total length:			43:57

== Personnel ==
- Sascha Konietzko
- Lucia Cifarelli
- Andy Selway
- Andee Blacksugar

=== Guest musicians ===
- MC Ocelot ("Next Move")

== Reception ==
Professional ratings
Review scores
Source	Rating
AllMusic	4/5 stars
GhostCultMag	9/10
SputnikMusic	3.5/5
Spill Magazine	4/5

Let Go was released to positive reviews. It has particularly been noted for its consistent quality and style for an album being released during the band's 40th anniversary year.
