= Krieg (album) =

Remix album by KMFDM
- Released: 5 January 2010
- Recorded: 2009
- Genre: Industrial rock, electro-industrial
- Length: 55:56
- Label: KMFDM

KMFDM remix album chronology
Brimborium (2008)	Krieg (2010)

Krieg is a 2010 remix album by industrial rock band KMFDM containing remixes of songs from their 2009 album Blitz. Krieg was released exclusively on the band's own label, KMFDM Records, on 5 January 2010.

== Reception ==
Professional ratings
Review scores
Source	Rating
FearNet	positive
Sputnikmusic	positive

Krieg received positive reviews.

== Track listing ==
All tracks are written by KMFDM

No.	Title	Remixer	Length
1.	"Bait & Switch (All 4 One Mix)"	Combichrist	4:21
2.	"Strut (Disco Balls Mix)"	Andy Selway	3:52
3.	"Potz Blitz! (Harmonic Tremors Mix)"	Seismologist	4:23
4.	"Bait & Switch (Sacred Cow Mix)"	Prong	4:00
5.	"Never Say Never (Naughty Habit Mix)"	Ivan de Prume	4:19
6.	"People of the Lie (Requiem Mix)"	Koichi Fukuda	4:53
7.	"Bitches (Pop Will Eat This Mix)"	Vile Evils	4:36
8.	"Never Say Never (Confessional Mix)"	Komor Kommando	5:53
9.	"People of the Lie (Crooked Illusion Mix)"	Mary Byker	5:38
10.	"Davai (Cyrillic Mix)"	Tweaker	5:16
11.	"Never Say Never (Candy Apple Mix)"	Dave Ogilvie	3:56
12.	"Davai (Bloody Fog Mix)"	Assemblage 23	4:49
Total length:			55:56
