= Hyëna =

Studio album by KMFDM
- Released: 9 September 2022
- Recorded: 2022
- Studio: Kommandozentrale & Chameleonstudios, Hamburg, Germany
- Genre: Industrial rock, electro-industrial, industrial metal
- Label: Metropolis/KMFDM
- Producer: Sascha Konietzko, Lucia Cifarelli

KMFDM chronology
Paradise (2019)	Hyëna (2022)	Let Go (2024)

Hyëna is the 21st studio album by German industrial rock band KMFDM, released on September 9, 2022. Due to the release of the prior album Paradise in September 2019, the time between Paradise and Hyëna represents the longest gap between KMFDM albums since their formation.

== Critical reception ==
Hyëna received very favorable reviews from critics.

Neil Z. Yeung of AllMusic said of the album, "KMFDM keeps listeners on their toes with this energized burst of power, winking humor, and their always-reliable trademark sound." Johann Carlsson of Release Music Magazine stated that the album is "driven by the vicious and virulent vocal onslaught of founder Sascha ‘Käpt’n K’ Konietzko and Lucia Cifarelli, the aural and angular guitar wizardry of Andee Blacksugar, and the forceful percussive thrust of Andy Selway".

John Deaux of All About the Rock stated that Hyëna "blasts through the speakers with the force of a napalm airstrike".

Alexandra Kozicki of MXDWN commented that "The album takes on a more aggressive tone, with heavy instrumentals and lyrics that call out those in power".

== Tour ==
KMFDM toured North America in September and October of 2022 in support of the album, as well as select dates in May 2023 coinciding with Sick New World Festival.

== Track listing ==
Hyëna track listing
No.	Title	Writer(s)	Length
1.	"All 4 1"	Sascha Konietzko, Andee Blacksugar, Lucia Cifarelli, Andy Selway	3:23
2.	"Rock 'n' Roll Monster"	Konietzko, Andrew Lindsley	3:01
3.	"Black Hole"	Konietzko, Blacksugar, Cifarelli	3:09
4.	"Hyëna"	Konietzko	5:02
5.	"All Wrong – But Alright"	Konietzko, Blacksugar	5:37
6.	"Blindface"	Konietzko, Blacksugar, Cifarelli, Selway	1:40
7.	"Déjà Vu"	Konietzko	1:54
8.	"Deluded Desperate Dangerous & Dumb"	Konietzko, Blacksugar	3:17
9.	"Immortally Yours"	Konietzko, Cifarelli	3:50
10.	"Liquor Fish & Cigarettes"	Konietzko, Blacksugar, Cifarelli, Selway	4:39
11.	"In Dub We Trust"	Konietzko, Blacksugar	4:08
Total length:			39:41
