= Monkey puzzle =

Monkey Puzzle may refer to:

== Biological ==
- Araucaria araucana, the monkey puzzle tree, a species of conifer
- Rathinda amor, a species of butterfly

== Music ==
- Monkey Puzzle (band), an a cappella music group
- The Monkey Puzzle (UFO album), 2006
- The Monkey Puzzle (The Saints album), 1981
- Monkey Puzzle, Sia's vanity record label
- "Monkey Puzzle Tree", a song by Lucia Cifarelli from her 2003 album From the Land of Volcanos

== Other media ==
- Monkey Puzzle (book), a 2000 illustrated children's book by Julia Donaldson and Axel Scheffler
- Monkey Puzzle (film), a 2008 Australian film
