= Tohuvabohu (album) =

Studio album by KMFDM
- Released: August 21, 2007
- Recorded: November 2006 – 2007
- Genre: Industrial rock; industrial metal; EBM
- Length: 51:09
- Label: Metropolis Records/KMFDM Records
- Producer: Sascha Konietzko; Jules Hodgson

KMFDM chronology
Hau Ruck (2005)	Tohuvabohu (2007)	Blitz (2009)

"Superpower"
24-second sample

Professional ratings
Review scores
Source	Rating
ReGen Magazine	4.5/5 stars

Tohuvabohu is industrial rock group KMFDM's 14th studio album, released on August 21, 2007, on the band's record label KMFDM Records and Metropolis Records. It was recorded in Seattle, Washington.

The word "tohuvabohu" is derived from the biblical Hebrew phrase "tohu va bohu", meaning "without form and void" or "chaos and utter confusion", which was used to describe the state of the earth before creation. The band describes its usage of the term as meaning "wild and chaotic". "Superpower" uses samples taken from phone calls made by fans to a phone line set up by the band. Additional samples from these phone calls were compiled on the track "What We Do For You" on Brimborium, a companion remix album.

== Cover art conflict ==
Shortly after the cover artwork for Tohuvabohu was revealed on the KMFDM website, longtime cover artist Brute! made a posting to his personal blog indicating his displeasure at the fact that the band had altered his original artwork submission. In the final version used on the album, in order to follow preexisting themes, the original red color palette had been switched to orange, and several stylized buildings and cranes in the background had been replaced with a starburst pattern.

== Track listing ==
All tracks are written by KMFDM, unless otherwise noted.

No.	Title	Length
1.	"Superpower"	4:16
2.	"Looking for Strange"	5:18
3.	"Tohuvabohu"	5:20
4.	"I Am What I Am"	4:52
5.	"Saft und Kraft"	4:36
6.	"Headcase"	3:57
7.	"Los Niños del Parque" (Liaisons Dangereuses cover)	3:58
8.	"Not in My Name"	4:50
9.	"Spit or Swallow"	4:11
10.	"Fait Accompli"	5:05
11.	"Bumaye"	4:46
Total length:		51:09

== Personnel ==
- Lucia Cifarelli – vocals
- Jules Hodgson – guitar, bass, programming
- Sascha Konietzko – vocals, analogue synthesizers, bass, programming
- Andy Selway – drums, programming
- Steve White – guitar, programming
- Army Denio – alto saxophone (1)
- Jin Kninja – Paris Selmer 'radial' trumpet (1)
