= Symbols (album) =

Studio album by KMFDM
- Released: 23 September 1997
- Studio: Bad Animals, Seattle, Washington; Luftschutzbunker, Seattle, Washington; Edelweiss Tonbetriebe, Kelowna; Studio 1001, New York City
- Genre: Industrial rock; electro-industrial
- Length: 56:34
- Label: Wax Trax!/TVT
- Producer: KMFDM; Chris Shepard

KMFDM chronology
Xtort (1996)	Symbols (1997)	Adios (1999)

Singles from Symbols
- 1. "Megalomaniac" Released: 1997; 2. "Anarchy" Released: 1997

The ninth studio album by German industrial band KMFDM, titled with a set of five unpronounceable, non-alphabetic symbols (💥☠️💣🌀👊) and commonly known as Symbols, was released on 23 September 1997 by Wax Trax! Records. In some media markets, it is simply referred to as KMFDM.

== Background ==
Recorded in Seattle, Symbols marked the introduction of Tim Sköld. While his contribution to this album was as a guest, he would become a full-fledged member for Adios and Attak. Sascha Konietzko, the frontman of KMFDM, said the title had no special meaning, and was just an idea for a title the group had very early on, before a single album had been released. En Esch said the idea for the album title came from the symbols used for curses in comic books. The symbols appear in the printed lyrics of "Down and Out"; the corresponding point in the song is covered with a censor-like beep in the song, and is replaced with "(SYMBOLS)" on the official KMFDM lyrics archive. Several song files had been purportedly wiped clean during a computer malfunction late in the recording stage, essentially leading to most of the songs having to be re-done basically from scratch.

== Release ==
Symbols was released on 23 September 1997. "Megalomaniac", "Anarchy", and "Leid und Elend" were included on the soundtrack of the video game Test Drive 5. "Megalomaniac" was also featured in the film Mortal Kombat Annihilation, and was the first single from its soundtrack. "Anarchy" appeared on the European version of the soundtrack to the 1998 film Lost in Space.

== Reception ==
Professional ratings
Review scores
Source	Rating
AllMusic	3/5 stars
Chicago Sun-Times	positive
CMJ New Music Monthly	no score

Andy Hinds of AllMusic gave a mixed review, calling some of the band's ideas repetitive while praising the programming. He also commented that the band keeps its sound fresh by bringing in new contributing artists for each new album, and noted the presence of Tim Skold and Nivek Ogre. He called the production top quality and the album "a fine place for newcomers to start," but said that Symbols offers people that have been following the band few surprises. Kevin Williams of the Chicago Sun-Times called "Megalomaniac" an "incredible, irresistible opener" and said the album "could result in a KMFDM takeover of electronica."

"Stray Bullet" received significant media attention after the Columbine High School Massacre due to the song's lyrics being posted on the website of one of the shooters, Eric Harris, before the massacre. The song was also played in the background of the final video posted to the YouTube account of the perpetrator of the Jokela school shooting.

== Track listing ==
No.	Title	Lyrics	Music	Length
1.	"Megalomaniac"	En Esch; Sascha Konietzko	Konietzko; Günter Schulz	6:07
2.	"Stray Bullet"	Esch; Konietzko	Konietzko; Schulz	5:32
3.	"Leid und Elend"	Esch; Konietzko	Konietzko; Schulz	6:10
4.	"Mercy"	Esch; Konietzko	Esch; Konietzko; Schulz	5:00
5.	"Torture"	Nivek Ogre	Konietzko	7:04
6.	"Spit Sperm"	Raymond Watts	Esch; Konietzko; Schulz	4:46
7.	"Anarchy"	Tim Skold	Esch; Konietzko; Bill Rieflin; Schulz	5:35
8.	"Down and Out"	Esch; Konietzko; Abby Travis	Esch; Konietzko; Schulz	6:40
9.	"Unfit"	Watts	Esch; Konietzko; Schulz	6:01
10.	"Waste"	Konietzko; Travis	Esch; Konietzko; Rieflin; Schulz	3:39
Total length:				56:34

== Personnel ==
- Sascha Konietzko – sequences/programming/loops, vocals (1–6, 8, 10), drums (7, 8)
- En Esch – vocals (1–6, 8, 10), percussion (2, 7, 8), slide guitar (2), cymbals (4, 6), tambourine (4), guitar (6, 9), sequences/programming/loops (7–10), scratch piano (10)
- Günter Schulz – guitar, programming (2), loops (4, 9), backing vocals (6, 10), percussion (7, 8)
- Abby Travis – vocals (1, 2, 4, 7, 8, 10), bass guitar (6, 9)
- Michel Bassin – guitar (4, 7–9), percussion (7)
- William Rieflin – drums (6, 10), loops (7, 10), percussion (7), sequences (10)
- Raymond Watts – vocals (6, 9)
- Amy Denio – saxophones (8)
- Nivek Ogre – vocals (5)
- Tim Skold – vocals (7)
