= Paradise (KMFDM album) =

Studio album by KMFDM
- Released: 27 September 2019
- Recorded: November 2017 – May 2019
- Studio: Kommandozentrale & Chameleonstudios, Hamburg, Germany
- Genre: Industrial rock, electro-industrial
- Length: 53:37
- Label: Metropolis/KMFDM
- Producer: Sascha Konietzko, Lucia Cifarelli

KMFDM chronology
Hell Yeah (2017)	Paradise (2019)	Hyëna (2022)

Professional ratings
Review scores
Source	Rating
AllMusic	4/5 stars
Sputnikmusic	3.0/5

Paradise is the 20th album by industrial band KMFDM. It was released on Metropolis Records and KMFDM Records on 27 September 2019. The album features the band's new core line-up of frontman/principal composer Sascha Konietzko, frontwoman/principal writer Lucia Cifarelli, drummer Andy Selway, and guitarist Andee Blacksugar, along with guest performances from Doug Wimbish, Cheryl Wilson, and on-and-off longtime collaborator Raymond Watts in his first appearance on a KMFDM album since 2003.

== Track listing ==
No.	Title	Writer(s)	Length
1.	"K•M•F"	Andee Blacksugar, Sascha Konietzko, Andrew Lindsley	4:22
2.	"No Regret"	Lucia Cifarelli, Konietzko	4:10
3.	"Oh My Goth"	Cifarelli, Konietzko	5:02
4.	"Paradise"	Cifarelli, Konietzko	7:59
5.	"WDYWB"	Blacksugar, Konietzko	5:03
6.	"Piggy"	Blacksugar, Cifarelli, Konietzko, Doug Wimbish	4:24
7.	"Disturb the Peace"	Blacksugar, Cifarelli, Konietzko	5:41
8.	"Automaton"	Blacksugar, Cifarelli, Konietzko	4:16
9.	"Binge Boil & Blow"	Konietzko, Raymond Watts	4:17
10.	"Megalo"	Konietzko	4:30
11.	"No God"	Blacksugar, Konietzko	3:53
Total length:			53:37

== Personnel ==
- Sascha Konietzko – vocals (1, 2, 4–7, 10), bass (1–5, 7–11), synths, drums (2, 3, 6–9, 11), noises (3)
- Lucia Cifarelli – vocals (3–8)
- Andy Selway – drums (1, 4, 5, 10)
- Andee Blacksugar – guitars, melodica (3)

=== Guest musicians ===
- Andrew "Ocelot" Lindsley – vocals (1)
- Cookie – howls (3)
- Lucas Selway – vocals (4)
- Cheryl Wilson – diva vocals (5)
- Doug Wimbish – bass (6)
- Raymond Watts – vocals (9)

=== Production ===
- Sascha Konietzko – production, mixing
- Lucia Cifarelli – production
- Brute! – artwork
- Chris Zander – layout
- Benjamin Lawrenz – mixing, mastering

== Charts ==
Chart (2019)	Peak position
US Independent Albums (Billboard)	45
