= The Humans (British band) =

British-American rock band

- Genres: Indie rock; experimental
- Years active: 2007–2020
- Labels: Vertical Species; Demon Music Group
- Members: Toyah Willcox; Bill Rieflin; Chris Wong

The Humans were a British-American rock band featuring singer Toyah Willcox, drummer Bill Rieflin, and musician Chris Wong. They have released three studio albums and have performed live in the UK, Estonia and the USA before disbanding in 2020, following Rieflin's passing.

== History ==
The Humans were formed in 2007 when musician Robert Fripp, who is married to Toyah Willcox, was invited to play at a birthday party for the President of Estonia. Fripp declined the invitation due to scheduling conflicts. Willcox then contacted the Estonian Embassy, and offered to organize a performance for the event. On acceptance by the Embassy, Willcox contacted friend Bill Rieflin, and suggested a collaboration to "do something that is just completely off the wall [with] just one bass and a voice". Rieflin later said "I had no idea why she would want a drummer to play bass. The concept of voice and two bassists as the musical core of the group is solely hers." Rieflin and Willcox hired also Chris Wong, who had previously worked with Willcox on her solo music tours and concerts, thus completing the three-piece outfit. Rieflin said Wong was the more technically accomplished bassist and performed the more demanding instrumental parts. The Humans performed at the Jazzkaar festival in Estonia in October 2007.

The band released their debut album We Are the Humans on 1 May 2009. The release was celebrated with a concert at a music festival in Tartu, where the band was joined by Fripp on guitar. The album was promoted by the single and music video with a cover of "These Boots Are Made for Walkin'". In February 2010, the band embarked on a short UK tour. The Humans released their second album Sugar Rush on 27 September 2011. Robert Fripp appeared on guitar on every track of the album. Igor Abuladze joined The Humans on their US and UK tour in 2011 in support of the album. In 2013, the band released a live album, Live at Scala London, recorded three years before at London's Scala.

The third album entitled Strange Tales was released worldwide on 1 March 2014, initially only in digital format. "Get in Your Car" was chosen as the lead single. A UK tour, Telling Strange Tales, took place in April 2015, and the album was then made available on CD.

Bill Rieflin died on 24 March 2020 from cancer at the age of 59. In July, the band released a box set compilation called Noise in Your Head containing all three previous albums, a live album, and a DVD with a live concert. The box set was credited to Toyah & The Humans and dedicated to Rieflin.

== Discography ==
=== Studio albums ===
- We Are the Humans (2009)
- Sugar Rush (2011)
- Strange Tales (2014)

=== Live albums ===
- Live at Scala London (2013)
- Live at Trading Boundaries (2021)

=== Compilations ===
- Noise in Your Head (2020)

=== Singles ===
- "These Boots Are Made for Walkin'" (2009)
- "Get in Your Car" (2014)
- "21st Century Schizoid Man" (2020)

=== Music videos ===
- "We Are the Humans" (2007)
- "Quicksilver" (2009)
- "These Boots Are Made for Walkin'" (2009)
- "Sea of Size" (2010)
