= Ruck Zuck (EP) =

Remix album by KMFDM
- Released: 9 May 2006
- Genre: Industrial
- Length: 41:16
- Label: KMFDM Records and Metropolis Records
- Producer: KMFDM

KMFDM remix album chronology
Ruck Zuck (2006)	Brimborium (2008)

Professional ratings
Review scores
Source	Rating
Allmusic	3/5 stars
ReGen Magazine	5/5 stars

Ruck Zuck (which loosely translated means "instantly" or "right now") is a remix album by KMFDM, featuring remixed tracks from their previous full-length release, Hau Ruck.

== Track listing ==
No.	Title	Remixer	Length
1.	"Free Your Hate (Käptn's Krunch Mix)"	Sascha Konietzko	4:49
2.	"Mini Mini Mini (J.Hogstorm and The Rain City Swingin' Samples Mix)"	Jules Hodgson	3:11
3.	"Professional Killer (The One and Only Mix)"	Steve White	6:26
4.	"Ready to Blow (Dwarves Mix)"	Dwarves	4:02
5.	"Hau Ruck (Spezial K Mix)"	Sascha Konietzko	3:42
6.	"Real Thing (Nude Mix)"	Nude	5:55
7.	"Der Mussolini" (DAF cover)		3:56
8.	"WWIII (The One and Only 'Extended' Mix)"	Steve White	6:06
9.	"Ansage"		3:09
