= Strange Tales (album) =

Studio album by The Humans
- Released: 1 March 2014
- Genre: Experimental; rock
- Label: Vertical Species
- Producer: Bill Rieflin

The Humans chronology
Sugar Rush (2011)	Strange Tales (2014)	Noise in Your Head (2020)

Strange Tales is the third studio album by the experimental rock band The Humans, consisting of Toyah Willcox, Bill Rieflin and Chris Wong. The album was initially released only in digital format on 1 March 2014 via Willcox's Vertical Species label. The CD edition was made available in April 2015, on the band's UK concert tour Telling Strange Tales. In 2020, the album was re-released by Demon Music Group on LP, credited to Toyah & The Humans, with a cover of King Crimson's classic "21st Century Schizoid Man" as a bonus track.

"Get in Your Car" was previewed as the lead single in February 2014.

== Track listing ==
All songs written by Toyah Willcox, Bill Rieflin and Chris Wong.

1. "Slow Descent" – 3:24
2. "She's Fast" – 2:50
3. "Get in Your Car" – 4:54
4. "Amnesia" – 5:00
5. "Bedhead" – 3:55
6. "Improbable Thing" – 3:55
7. "Sleep Tight" – 4:51

2020 LP edition bonus track

8. "21st Century Schizoid Man" – 7:02

== Personnel ==
- Toyah Willcox: voice, percussion
- Bill Rieflin: bass, keyboards, guitar, drums, sounds, voice, production
- Chris Wong: bass, guitar, drums, percussion, voice
- Brianna Atwell: violin, viola
- Steve Creswell: violin
- Alex Guy: violin
- Rich Cole: saxophone
- Don Gunn: percussion, mixing, co-production
- John McCaig: mastering
