= Megalomaniac (KMFDM song) =

Single by KMFDM

from the album Symbols
- B-side: "Remixes"
- Released: 1997
- Recorded: 1997
- Genre: Electro-industrial, industrial rock
- Length: 6:07 (album version); 4:19 (single mix)
- Label: Wax Trax!; TVT
- Songwriter(s): Sascha Konietzko; Klaus Schandelmaier; Günter Schulz
- Producer(s): Sascha Konietzko

KMFDM singles chronology
"Rules" (1996)	"Megalomaniac" (1997)	"Boots" (2002)

Professional ratings
Review scores
Source	Rating
Allmusic	2.5/5 stars

"Megalomaniac" is a song by industrial rock band KMFDM from the album commonly referred to as Symbols. It was released in various forms in late 1997 and early 1998. The song peaked at #22 on Billboard's Bubbling Under 100 chart, the band's only appearance on the chart. The associated music video featured a then-unknown, and only 17 year old Kelly Brook. A 7" vinyl version was released in 2009.

The song was also used in the film Mortal Kombat Annihilation in the end credits and in the 1998 racing video game Test Drive 5, along with an instrumental version in the latter.

== Track listings ==
All songs composed by KMFDM.

=== Megalomaniac Remixes (1997) ===
This version was also split into two separate records, with two songs on each.

No.	Title	Remixer	Length
1.	"Megalomaniac (Excessive Force)"	Sascha Konietzko	6:14
2.	"Megalomaniac (Talla 2XLC)"	Talla 2XLC	6:55
3.	"Megalomaniac (Talla 2XLC-Alternative)"	Talla 2XLC	7:37
4.	"Unfit (Günter Schulz)"	Günter Schulz	5:47
Total length:			26:33

=== MDFMK (1998) ===
No.	Title	Remixer	Length
1.	"Megalomaniac (💣︎)"	Sascha Konietzko	6:14
2.	"Anarchy (Fusako Mix)"	Tim Skold	4:55
3.	"Megalomaniac (Uxii Mix)"	Talla 2XLC	6:55
4.	"Unfit (Death Before Taxes Mix)"	Günter Schulz	5:47
5.	"Anarchy (God and the State Mix)"	Tim Skold	5:45
6.	"Megalomaniac (Tvvå Mix)"	Talla 2XLC	7:37
Total length:			37:13

=== 7" reissue (2009) ===
No.	Title	Length
1.	"Megalomaniac (Single Mix)"	4:19
2.	"Megalomaniac (Excessive Force Mix)"	6:15
Total length:		10:34
