= Hau Ruck =

Studio album by KMFDM
- Released: September 13, 2005
- Recorded: December 2004 – July 2005
- Genres: Industrial rock, industrial metal
- Length: 52:43
- Label: Metropolis Records
- Producer: KMFDM

KMFDM chronology
WWIII (2003)	Hau Ruck (2005)	Tohuvabohu (2007)

Professional ratings
Review scores
Source	Rating
AllMusic	3.5/5 stars
ReGen Magazine	5/5 stars

Hau Ruck is the 13th album by industrial rock band KMFDM, released by Metropolis Records on September 13, 2005. It was recorded in Seattle, Washington

== Background ==
While touring in support of 2003's WWIII, band leader Sascha Konietzko discussed the group's plans for the next album: "What we can all agree on, and I'm not saying we disagree on any other things, but everybody was pointing out that it should be really different. There are terms floating around such as, 'More noisy, more dance-y, more electronic and less butt rock.'" After releasing a single album with Sanctuary Records, the band re-signed with Metropolis Records.

The album had originally been titled FUBAR, in reference to the military acronym standing for "Fucked Up Beyond All Recognition/Repair". However, in June 2005 the band announced they were abandoning that title, and on July 21, 2005, they announced the new title would be Hau Ruck, German for "heave-ho". Hau Ruck is the first KMFDM album without a five-letter word title since 1988's Don't Blow Your Top.

== Production ==
According to Sascha Konietzko, Hau Ruck was created entirely using analog equipment.

== Release ==
Hau Ruck was released on September 13, 2005. Many songs from Hau Ruck were remixed for KMFDM's next release, Ruck Zuck.

== Track listing ==
No.	Title	Length
1.	"Free Your Hate"	4:59
2.	"Hau Ruck"	5:22
3.	"You're No Good"	4:59
4.	"New American Century"	4:51
5.	"Real Thing"	5:05
6.	"Every Day's a Good Day"	4:44
7.	"Mini Mini Mini" (Jacques Dutronc cover)	2:56
8.	"Professional Killer"	4:34
9.	"Feed Our Fame"	4:31
10.	"Ready to Blow"	4:28
11.	"Auf Wiederseh'n"	6:14
Total length:		52:43

== Personnel ==
- Lucia Cifarelli – vocals
- Jules Hodgson – guitars, bass, programming, engineering
- Sascha Konietzko – vocals, analogue synthesizers, sequencers, engineering
- Andy Selway – drums, programming
- Steve White – guitars, programming
- Mina Stolle – trumpet (11)
