= WWIII (album) =

Studio album by KMFDM
- Released: September 23, 2003
- Genre: Industrial metal; industrial rock; nu metal
- Length: 51:38
- Label: Sanctuary, Metropolis
- Producer: KMFDM

KMFDM chronology
Attak (2002)	WWIII (2003)	Hau Ruck (2005)

WWIII is KMFDM's 12th studio album, released on September 23, 2003. It follows the common KMFDM practice of naming albums with five-letter words. This is KMFDM's only release on Sanctuary Records. Lyrically, the album is overtly political. The songs primarily attack George W. Bush's presidency, various US wars in the Middle East, and America's foreign policy. The last track, "Intro", introduces the members of the band. It was recorded in Seattle, Washington. The album's first and eponymous single was featured in the game Saints Row: The Third.

== Reception ==
Professional ratings
Review scores
Source	Rating
AllMusic	2.5/5 stars
laut.de	3/5 stars

WWIII received mixed reviews. The News-Times called it a "butt-rock masterpiece". David Jeffries of AllMusic said, "The most frustrating thing about WWIII is that it's so darn inconsistent".

== Track listing ==
All tracks are written by Lucia Cifarelli, Jules Hodgson, Sascha Konietzko, and Andy Selway unless otherwise noted.

No.	Title	Length
1.	"WWIII"	4:58
2.	"From Here on Out"	4:03
3.	"Blackball" (Cifarelli, Hodgson, Konietzko, Selway, Raymond Watts)	5:11
4.	"Jihad"	3:22
5.	"Last Things"	5:05
6.	"Pity for the Pious" (Hodgson, Konietzko, Selway, Watts)	5:51
7.	"Stars & Stripes"	4:00
8.	"Bullets, Bombs & Bigotry" (Hodgson, Konietzko, Selway, Watts)	4:19
9.	"Moron"	5:05
10.	"Revenge" (Hodgson, Konietzko, Selway, Watts)	5:08
11.	"Intro" (Hodgson, Konietzko, Selway)	4:36
Total length:		51:38

== Personnel ==
- Sascha Konietzko – programming, loops, synths, vocals (1–5, 7–9, 11), bass (1, 2, 4, 6, 7, 9, 10)
- Jules Hodgson – guitar, programming (1, 3, 5, 8–11), bass (3, 5, 8), synths (1, 5), banjo (1), strings (3), piano (6, 8), drums (11)
- Andy Selway – drums, vocals (11)
- Lucia Cifarelli – vocals (1–5, 7–11)
- Raymond Watts – vocals (2, 3, 6–8, 10, 11)
- Bill Rieflin – drums (11), vocals (11), loops (4, 10)
- Cheryl Wilson – vocals (6, 10)
- Curt Golden – harmonica (8)
- Mona Mur – "dominance" (5)
