= MDFMK (album) =

Studio album by MDFMK
- Released: March 28, 2000
- Recorded: 1998–1999
- Genres: Industrial rock; industrial dance music
- Length: 53:08
- Label: Republic/Universal
- Producers: Sascha Konietzko; Chris Shepard; Tim Skold

MDFMK is an album released by industrial rock band MDFMK on March 28, 2000. It was the only studio album released by the band before it was discontinued and reformed once again as KMFDM. In a 2003 interview, band leader Sascha Konietzko said the album had sold around 120,000 copies.

== Critical reception ==
Professional ratings
Aggregate scores
| Source | Rating |
|---|---|
| Metacritic | 64/100 |
Review scores
| Source | Rating |
| AllMusic | 2.5/5 stars |

MDFMK was met with "generally favorable" reviews from critics. At Metacritic, which assigns a weighted average rating out of 100 to reviews from mainstream publications, this release received an average score of 64, based on 4 reviews.

== Track listing ==
All tracks are written by Sascha Konietzko and Tim Skold, unless otherwise noted.

| No. | Title | Length |
|---|---|---|
| 1. | "Now" | 4:41 |
| 2. | "Rabblerouser" (Lucia Cifarelli, Konietzko, Skold) | 4:12 |
| 3. | "Get Out of My Head" (Cifarelli, Konietzko, Skold) | 4:52 |
| 4. | "Gasoline" | 4:09 |
| 5. | "Torpedoes" | 4:15 |
| 6. | "Stare at the Sun" | 6:02 |
| 7. | "Be Like Me" | 4:16 |
| 8. | "Transmutation" (Cifarelli, Konietzko, Skold) | 4:21 |
| 9. | "Control?" (stylized as "©ontrol¿") | 5:54 |
| 10. | "Hydro-Electric" (Cifarelli, Konietzko, Skold) | 4:56 |
| 11. | "Witch Hunt" | 5:30 |
| 12. | "American Dream" (only available on Japanese release) | 5:22 |
| 13. | "Action/Reaction" (only available on Japanese release) | 4:05 |
| Total length: | | 62:35 |

== Personnel ==
- Lucia Cifarelli - vocals
- Sascha Konietzko - vocals, percussion, programming
- Tim Skold - vocals, guitar, bass, programming
