= Attak =

Studio album by KMFDM
- Released: 19 March 2002
- Recorded: 2001
- Studio: Moscozzi Studios, Seattle
- Genre: Industrial metal
- Length: 50:25
- Label: Metropolis
- Producer: Sascha Konietzko; Tim Skold; Bill Rieflin

KMFDM chronology
Adios (1999)	Attak (2002)	WWIII (2003)

Attak is the eleventh studio album by German industrial band KMFDM, released on March 19, 2002, by Metropolis Records. The band's first album following a three-year hiatus, it was the first to feature member Lucia Cifarelli and the last to feature member Tim Sköld.

== History ==
The album was originally going to be titled Attaq and written in a Middle Eastern font, but was changed by Konietzko after the September 11 attacks, who explained that the band's history with the Columbine shootings would have made the original title "pretty fucking harsh".

== Reception ==
Professional ratings
Aggregate scores
Source	Rating
Metacritic	56/100
Review scores
Source	Rating
Allmusic	3.5/5 stars
Rolling Stone	favorable
Splendid	unfavorable

Attak received mixed reviews. Bradley Torreano of AllMusic describes the album's production as "ugly" and that it has a "few songs that are way too long" but still claims it has a "few truly inspiring industrial metal anthems". Sonya Sutherland of The Michigan Daily is more positive of the album, stating its "filled with subtle beat changes and progressive riffs every track on Attak is superior to the metal shit that’s being served up to the mainstream by the spoonful and reflects the true talent of these Deutschland musical heroes".

== Track listing ==
No.	Title	Music	Length
1.	"Attak/Reload"	Lucia Cifarelli, Sascha Konietzko	3:59
2.	"Skurk"	Konietzko, Tim Sköld	3:55
3.	"Dirty"	Jules Hodgson, Konietzko, Bill Rieflin, Raymond Watts	4:41
4.	"Urban Monkey Warfare"	Cifarelli, Konietzko	4:31
5.	"Save Me"	Konietzko, Sköld	5:42
6.	"Yohoho"	Cifarelli, Konietzko, Watts	4:16
7.	"Superhero"	Cifarelli, Konietzko	4:25
8.	"Sturm & Drang"	Konietzko, Sköld	3:57
9.	"Preach/Pervert"	Konietzko, Watts	4:30
10.	"Risen"	Konietzko, Sköld	5:59
11.	"Sleep"	Cifarelli, Konietzko, Rieflin	4:30
Total length:			50:25

== Personnel ==
- Sascha Konietzko – drums (1–7, 9, 10), programming (1–11), synthesizers (1–6, 10), vocals (1–8, 10, 11), bass (3–7, 9, 10), guitars (3, 4, 6, 7, 11), percussion (5), cockpit voice recorder (6)
- Tim Sköld – guitars (1, 2, 5, 8, 10), bass (2, 8, 10), drums (2, 8, 10), programming (2, 5, 8, 10), synthesizers (2, 5, 8, 10), vocals (2, 5, 8, 10), percussion (5), drumloops (9)
- Bill Rieflin – drums (1, 5, 11), bass (1, 11), programming (3, 5), synthesizers (3, 5, 11), percussion (5, 11), guitars (11)
- Lucia Cifarelli – vocals (1, 4–7, 11), Sidstation "Ninja" (4)
- Jules Hodgson – guitars (3, 9)
- Raymond Watts – vocals (3, 6, 9), drumloops (9)
- Arianne Schreiber – vocals (3)
- Curt Golden – slide guitars (11)
- Dorona Alberti – vocals (11)
