= Dirty Bomb (album) =

Studio album by KGC
- Released: 14 December 2006
- Recorded: LAB UK; KommandoZentrale, Seattle
- Genre: Synthpop
- Label: KMFDM Records
- Producer: KGC

Dirty Bomb is the sole album released by KGC, a collaboration between Sascha Konietzko and Lucia Cifarelli of KMFDM and Dean Garcia of Curve, released in 2006.

It was released on KMFDM Records (KMFDM004 - CD)

== Reception ==
The critical reception was variable. Release Magazine noted that Garcia had "never been catchier and his unique combination of hip/hop beats and that slithery bass are firmly on point." Inside Pulse described it as sounding "like KMFDM" second-string tracks, and called it "less of a bad effort and more of a disappointment."

== Track listing ==
All lyrics by Lucia Cifarelli

1. "Ever After" - 4:16
2. "6 ft Below" - 3:44
3. "Katatonic" - 3:34
4. "Best of Everything" - 3:55
5. "Back to Life" - 3:56
6. "Good Things" - 4:02
7. "Made 4 Luv" - 4:15
8. "Misery" - 4:13
9. "Barely Cold" - 3:30
10. "Back to the Front (Feel Love)" - 5:41

Total playing time: 41:06

== Personnel ==
- Lucia Cifarelli – vocals, lyrics, writing, composition, mixing, production
- Dean Garcia – writing, composition, bass, drums, guitars, keyboards, programming, various electronica, recording, engineering, production
- Sascha Konietzko – writing, composition, analogue synths, bass and guitar, loop enforcement, recording, engineering, production, mixing

=== Additional personnel ===
- DOLK – art
- Brian Gardner – mastering at Bernie Grundman Mastering
- Jules Hodgson – various guitars, bass
- Phil Knott – dean photo
- Chris McCormack – additional composition on 2 and 3, very noisy guitar
- Karen Moskowitz – sascha photo
- Adrienne Thiessen (Gemini Visuals Photography) – lucia photo
- Vibrent Management – project management
- Patrick Volkmar – layout
