= We Are the Humans =

Studio album by The Humans
- Released: 1 May 2009
- Recorded: 2008
- Genre: Experimental; rock
- Label: Vertical Species
- Producer: Bill Rieflin

The Humans chronology
We Are the Humans (2009)	Sugar Rush (2011)

We Are the Humans is the debut studio album by the experimental rock band The Humans, consisting of Toyah Willcox, Bill Rieflin and Chris Wong. The album was released in 2009 via Willcox's label Vertical Species.

== Background ==
The band previewed the album at their first concerts in Estonia in October 2007. The material was then recorded in Seattle during 2008. The band returned to Estonia to perform the album in May 2009, joined on stage by Willcox's husband Robert Fripp. In February 2010, The Humans further promoted the album with a short UK tour.

Three music videos have been released from the album: "We Are the Humans" (2007), "Quicksilver" (2009) and "These Boots Are Made for Walkin'" (2009). The latter was also released as a single.

In 2020, the album was re-issued by Demon Music Group in vinyl and digital formats, credited to Toyah & The Humans.

== Track listing ==
All songs written by Toyah Willcox, Bill Rieflin and Chris Wong, except 1, 3 (Willcox), 9 (Willcox/Robert Fripp) and 11 (Lee Hazlewood).

1. "We Are the Humans" – 5:25
2. "Is It Wrong" – 3:58
3. "Twisted Soul" – 2:50
4. "Telekinesis" – 3:17
5. "Quicksilver" – 4:34
6. "Labyrinth" – 2:45
7. "Icarus" – 4:36
8. "Noise in Your Head" – 3:41
9. "This Belongs to You" – 5:47
10. "Demigod" – 5:21

CD and digital edition bonus track

11. "These Boots Are Made for Walkin'" (featuring Robert Fripp) – 3:10

2020 digital edition bonus track

12. "We Are the Humans" (Toyah's Home Demo) – 3:45
13. "Twisted Soul" (Toyah's Home Demo) – 2:49
14. "Icarus" (Toyah's Home Demo) – 3:25

== Personnel ==
- Toyah Willcox: voice, loops, angry bee
- Bill Rieflin: bass, synths, gadgets, whirring organ, drums, claps, hums, production
- Chris Wong: bass, guitar, organ, humming
