= Sugar Rush (album) =

Studio album by The Humans
- Released: 27 September 2011
- Recorded: 2010
- Genre: Experimental; rock
- Length: 49:43
- Label: The End; Vertical Species
- Producer: Bill Rieflin

The Humans chronology
We Are the Humans (2009)	Sugar Rush (2011)	Strange Tales (2014)

Professional ratings
Review scores
Source	Rating
AllMusic	3.5/5 stars
The Daily News	Favourable

Sugar Rush is the second studio album by the experimental rock band The Humans, consisting of Toyah Willcox, Bill Rieflin and Chris Wong. It was first released in the USA on 27 September 2011 via The End Records, and then worldwide on 2 October via Willcox's Vertical Species label.

== Background ==
Robert Fripp of King Crimson (and privately Toyah's husband) plays guitar on the album's every track. Igor Abuladze joined The Humans on their 2011 US and UK tour in support of the album. Promotional music video for "Sea of Size" had been released in October 2010. Live at Scala London EP was made available as a free download via The Humans' official website, with a download link listed in the UK CD album's liner notes.

In 2020, Sugar Rush was re-issued by Demon Music Group in vinyl and digital formats, credited to Toyah & The Humans.

== Track listing ==
All songs written by Toyah Willcox, Bill Rieflin and Chris Wong, except 8 (Willcox).

1. "Titanium Girl" – 3:14
2. "Love in a Different Way" – 4:35
3. "Sea of Size" – 3:03
4. "Pebble" – 3:51
5. "Small Town Psychopath" – 4:53
6. "Sweet Agitation" – 4:08
7. "Playing in the Dark" – 3:27
8. "Snow at 10:23" – 4:27
9. "Sugar Rush" – 2:15
10. "This Reasoning" – 4:53
11. "Fragment Pool" – 3:52
12. "Put a Woman on the Moon" – 2:14

Bonus track

13. "Small Town Psychopath" (Version) – 4:37

== Personnel ==
- Toyah Willcox: vocals
- Bill Rieflin: bass guitar, percussion, keyboards, production
- Chris Wong: bass guitar, guitar
- Robert Fripp: guitar
