= Zilch (electromagnetism) =

Physics term; a conserved quantity of the electromagnetic field

In physics, zilch (or zilches) is a set of ten conserved quantities of the source-free electromagnetic field, which were discovered by Daniel M. Lipkin in 1964. The name refers to the fact that the zilches are conserved only in regions free of electric charge, and therefore have limited physical significance. One of the conserved quantities (Lipkin's $Z^0$) has an intuitive physical interpretation and is also known as optical chirality.

== Optical chirality ==
Lipkin observed that if he defined the quantities

$$\begin{align}
Z^0 & = \mathbf{E}\cdot \nabla \times\mathbf{E} + \mathbf{B} \cdot \nabla \times\mathbf{B} \\
\mathbf{Z} & = \frac{1}{c}\left ( \mathbf{E}\times\frac{d}{dt}\mathbf{E} + \mathbf{B} \times\frac{d}{dt} \mathbf{B} \right )
\end{align}$$

then the free Maxwell equations imply that $\partial_0 Z^0 + \nabla \cdot \mathbf{Z} = 0$.

The precedent equation implies that the quantity $\int Z^0 \, d^3x$ is constant. This time-independent quantity is one of the ten zilches Lipkin discovered. Nowadays, the quantity $\int Z^0 \, d^3x$ is widely known as optical chirality (up to a factor of 1/2).

The quantity ${Z}^{0}$ is the spatial density of optical chirality, while $\mathbf{Z}$ is the optical chirality flux. Generalizing the aforementioned differential conservation law for $Z^0$, Lipkin found another nine conservation laws, all unrelated to the stress–energy tensor. He collectively named these ten conserved quantities the zilch (nowadays, they are also called the zilches) because of their apparent lack of physical significance.

== Properties of zilch tensor ==
The zilch is often described in terms of the zilch tensor, $Z^\mu_{\nu\rho}$. The latter can be expressed using the dual electromagnetic tensor $\hat{F}^{\mu\nu}=(1/2)\epsilon^{\mu\nu\rho\sigma}F_{\rho\sigma}$ as$Z^\mu_{\nu\rho} = \hat{F}^{\mu\lambda}F_{\lambda\nu,\rho} - F^{\mu\lambda} \hat{F}_{\lambda\nu,\rho}$.

The zilch tensor is symmetric under the exchange of its first two indices, $\mu$ and $\nu$, while it is also traceless with respect to any two indices, as well as divergence-free with respect to any index.

The conservation law $\partial_{\rho}Z^{\mu \nu \rho}=0$ means that the following ten quantities are time-independent:

$$\int d^{3}x Z^{\mu \nu 0}=\int d^{3}x Z^{\nu \mu 0}.$$

These are the ten zilches (or just the zilch) Lipkin discovered. In fact, only nine zilches are independent. The time-independent quantity $\int d^{3}x Z^{000}$ is known as the 00-zilch and is equal to the aforementioned optical chirality

$\int Z^0 \, d^3x$ ($Z^{000}=Z^{0}$).

In general, the time-independent quantity $\int d^{3}x Z^{\mu \nu 0}$ is known as the $\mu \nu$-zilch (the indices $\mu, \nu$ run from 0 to 3) and it is clear that there are ten such quantities (nine independent).

It was later demonstrated that Lipkin's zilch is part of an infinite number of zilch-like conserved quantities, a general property of free fields.

== History ==
One of the zilches has been rediscovered. This is the zilch called "optical chirality", so named by Tang and Cohen since it determines the degree of chiral asymmetry in the rate of excitation of a small chiral molecule by an incident electromagnetic field. A further physical insight of optical chirality was offered in 2012; optical chirality is to the curl or time derivative of the electromagnetic field, what helicity, spin and related quantities are to the electromagnetic field itself. The physical interpretation of all zilches for topologically nontrivial electromagnetic fields was investigated in 2018.

The discovery of the ten zilches in 1964 raised an important mathematical question about their relation with symmetries. Recently, the full answer to this question seems to have been found. This is the question:

What are the symmetries of the standard Maxwell action functional:

$S[A_{\mu}]= -\frac{1}{4} \int d^{4}x F_{\mu \nu}F^{\mu \nu}$

(with $F_{\mu \nu}=\partial_{\mu}A_{\nu} - \partial_{\nu}A_{\mu}$ and $A_{\mu}$ is the dynamical field variable) that give rise to the conservation of all zilches using Noether's theorem? Until recently, the answer to this question had been given only for the case of optical chirality by Philbin in 2013. This open question was also emphasized by Aghapour, Andersson, and Rosquist in 2020, while these authors found the symmetries of the duality-symmetric Maxwell action underlying the conservation of all zilches. (Aghapour, Andersson, and Rosquist did not find the symmetries of the standard Maxwell action, but speculated that such symmetries should exist.) Earlier works also study the conservation of zilch in the context of duality-symmetric electromagnetism, but the corresponding symmetries' variational character was not established.

The full answer to the question was given for the first time by Letsios in 2022, where the symmetries of the standard Maxwell action underlying the conservation of all zilches were found. According to Letsios, a hidden invariance algebra of free Maxwell equations in potential form is related to the conservation of all zilches. Letsios derived all Lipkin's zilches using Noether's theorem from the standard electromagnetic action functional, in contrast to previous works that made use of non-standard action functionals.

== See also ==
- Conservation law
- Noether's theorem
