= Drill (American band) =

American alternative rock band

- Genres: Alternative rock, hard rock, industrial rock
- Years active: 1993-1998
- Labels: DV8/A&M Records
- Past members: Lucia Cifarelli; John DeServio; Paul Alves; Dan Harnett; Marcus Farny

Drill was an American alternative/hard rock band from New York City, formed in 1993. The band's lineup consisted of vocalist Lucia Cifarelli, guitarist Dan Harnett, future Black Label Society bassist John DeServio, and drummer Marcus Farny.

Drill was signed to DV8 Records, which was distributed by A&M Records. Their song "What You Are" was featured in the film Empire Records.

The band split up shortly after the release of their 1995 self-titled album Drill, which featured additional guitarist Paul Alves. Cifarelli went on to join industrial rock bands MDFMK and KMFDM.

Drill recorded a second album, White Elephant, which was never released following the merger of PolyGram into Universal Music Group.

== Albums ==
- Drill (1995)
- White Elephant (unreleased)
