= MDFMK =

Multinational industrial rock band

- Promotional photo of MDFMK, 2000

Background information
- Origin: Germany
- Genres: Industrial rock
- Years active: 1999–2001
- Labels: Universal Records
- Members: Sascha Konietzko; Tim Skold; Lucia Cifarelli

MDFMK was an industrial rock band formed by two members of KMFDM, Sascha Konietzko and Tim Sköld. Lucia Cifarelli, formerly of the band Drill, later joined to make a trio.

== History ==
Due to "differences in vision and drive", KMFDM disbanded in 1999. Sascha Konietzko and Skold continued working together under the name MDFMK. Konietzko was living in New York at the time, and auditioned female singers to provide vocals for the album. Through this process, he selected Lucia Cifarelli (formerly of the band Drill). The trio released only one album: MDFMK (2000, Universal Records). All three shared vocal duties on the album. Their song "Missing Time," originally made for an earlier version of the video game Prey, was used in the animated movie Heavy Metal 2000.

The band toured the United States and Canada in 2000, during which it had a fourth member, a giant robot guitarist named Zyclor.

Konietzko stated in 2003 that there was material for what he called "MDFMK #2", but that Universal Records was "sitting on it". He also said that if Universal never released the material, he would eventually buy the rights to it and release it himself.

== Discography ==
=== Albums ===
- MDFMK (2000)

=== Other ===
- Gravity Games 2000: Summer Sounds, Vol. 1 (2000)
  - Track 3: Rabblerouser (4:11)
- Heavy Metal 2000 (2000)
  - Track 3: Missing Time (4:35) (non-album track)
