= Legion Within =

US musical group

- Origin: Seattle, Washington, U.S.
- Genres: Dark wave, gothic rock, industrial rock
- Years active: 2000–present
- Labels: Tragick Records, KMFDM Records
- Members: William Wilson, Shannon Cole, Erica Branch-Butler, Aaron Nicholes, Paul MacKusick
- Past members: Jasyn Byrum, Ed Severtson, Josh Van Winkle, Matt Rushin, Markus Krieg, John Gibson, Ken Stubblefield, Lisa Smith, Marta DeLeon
- Website: Legion Within

Legion Within is a gothic industrial rock band founded in 2000 and based in Seattle, Washington.

== Discography ==
Date of Release	Title	Label	Notes
February 13, 2003	Ayumi	Tragick Records	Debut Album
September 2, 2004	Legion Within	Self-published	EP
December 7, 2004	Aeons	Tragick Records	
February 13, 2007	Empty Men	Self-published	EP
June 16, 2009	Mouth of Madness	KMFDM Records	
