= Lucia Cifarelli =

American singer

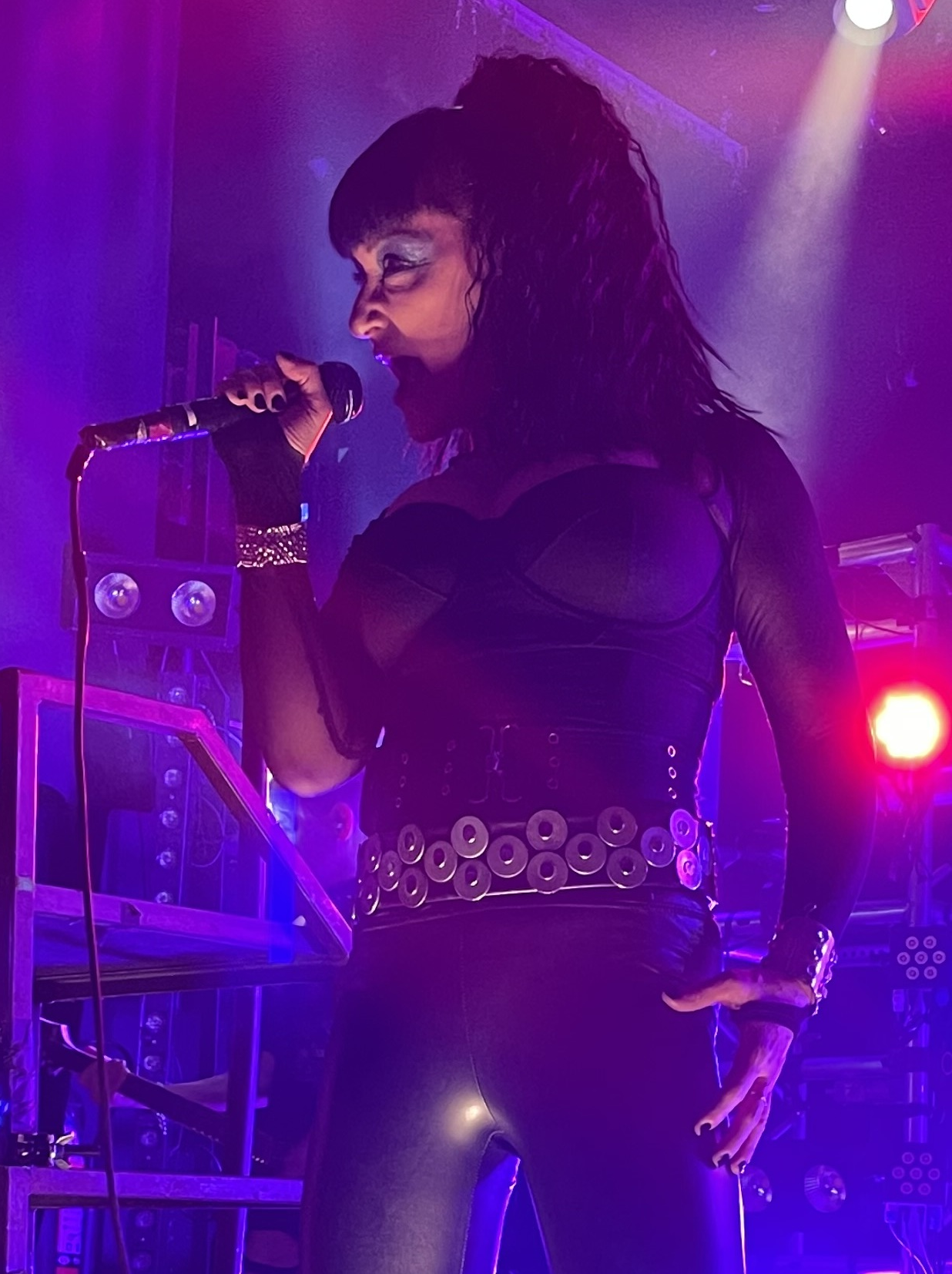
- Cifarelli performing with KMFDM in 2022

Background information
- Born: September 23, 1970 (age 56)
- Origin: Long Island, New York, U.S.
- Genres: Industrial metal; industrial rock; alternative rock; hard rock
- Occupations: Singer; musician
- Instruments: Vocals; keyboards
- Member of: KMFDM
- Formerly of: Drill, MDFMK, KGC, Schwein

Lucia Cifarelli (born September 23, 1970) is an American singer, best known for her work with industrial band KMFDM. She was formerly the vocalist for the band Drill and also performed in KMFDM offshoots MDFMK and KGC, and the <PIG> / Buck-Tick project Schwein.

== Career ==
Cifarelli got her start recording in studios in New York, eventually forming her own band, Drill, along with future Black Label Society bass guitarist John DeServio. Drill released one self-titled album, spawning two music videos and getting a third song featured in the movie Empire Records. Later in 1995, Drill opened for Stabbing Westward's Wither, Blister, Burn, and Peel Tour. The band broke up shortly after the end of the tour.

Cifarelli joined the KMFDM-hiatus band MDFMK in 2000. The project lasted for one self-titled album. In 2001, Cifarelli and Sascha Konietzko worked on the supergroup Schwein and its albums Schweinstein and the subsequent remix album Son of Schweinstein. After the MDFMK project was discontinued, Cifarelli was asked to return as a member of KMFDM. She has been a member of the band since 2002's Attak. She recorded two solo albums, From the Land of Volcanos (2003) and I Am Eye (2021). One single from the first album, "I Will", appeared on the American Pie 2 soundtrack. Cifarelli performed on the band KGC's 2006 album Dirty Bomb.

== Personal life ==
Lucia Cifarelli was born on September 23, 1970, in Long Island, New York. The youngest of four children, she grew up surrounded by music and art, developing a love for singing, songwriting and performing at an early age. Cifarelli's first vocal coach, Tanya Travers, whom she found in the Village Voice classified ads at fourteen, introduced Cifarelli to her first songwriting collaborator Dan Wise, who would later go on to produce such notable artists as Run-DMC, The New York Dolls, Ani Difranco, 22 Brides, John Mayor and The Scissor Sisters. Travers would later introduce Cifarelli to music producer Ric Wake, who signed her band Drill to A&M Records.

Due to a label restructuring, the band was dropped upon delivery of their sophomore effort and later broke up. Not long after Cifarelli joined MDFMK, an offshoot of KMFDM, where she co-wrote, recorded and toured with the band for their only album on Republic Records.

Before the reformation of KMFDM, Cifarelli secured a record deal with Universal Records and moved to London to record her first solo album From the Land of Volcanos with music producer Ian Stanley, one of the original members of Tears for Fears. Universal later declined to release it.

Since the reformation of KMFDM, Cifarelli has been a featured vocalist and co-writer on every album since 2002 and has played 456 shows with the band as of January 2020.

In November 2019, Cifarelli began writing her follow-up solo album. On July 2, 2021, she released the album I Am Eye.

In July 2005, she married KMFDM founder and producer Sascha Konietzko. They live in Hamburg, Germany, her husband's hometown. The couple has one daughter named Annabella.

== Discography ==
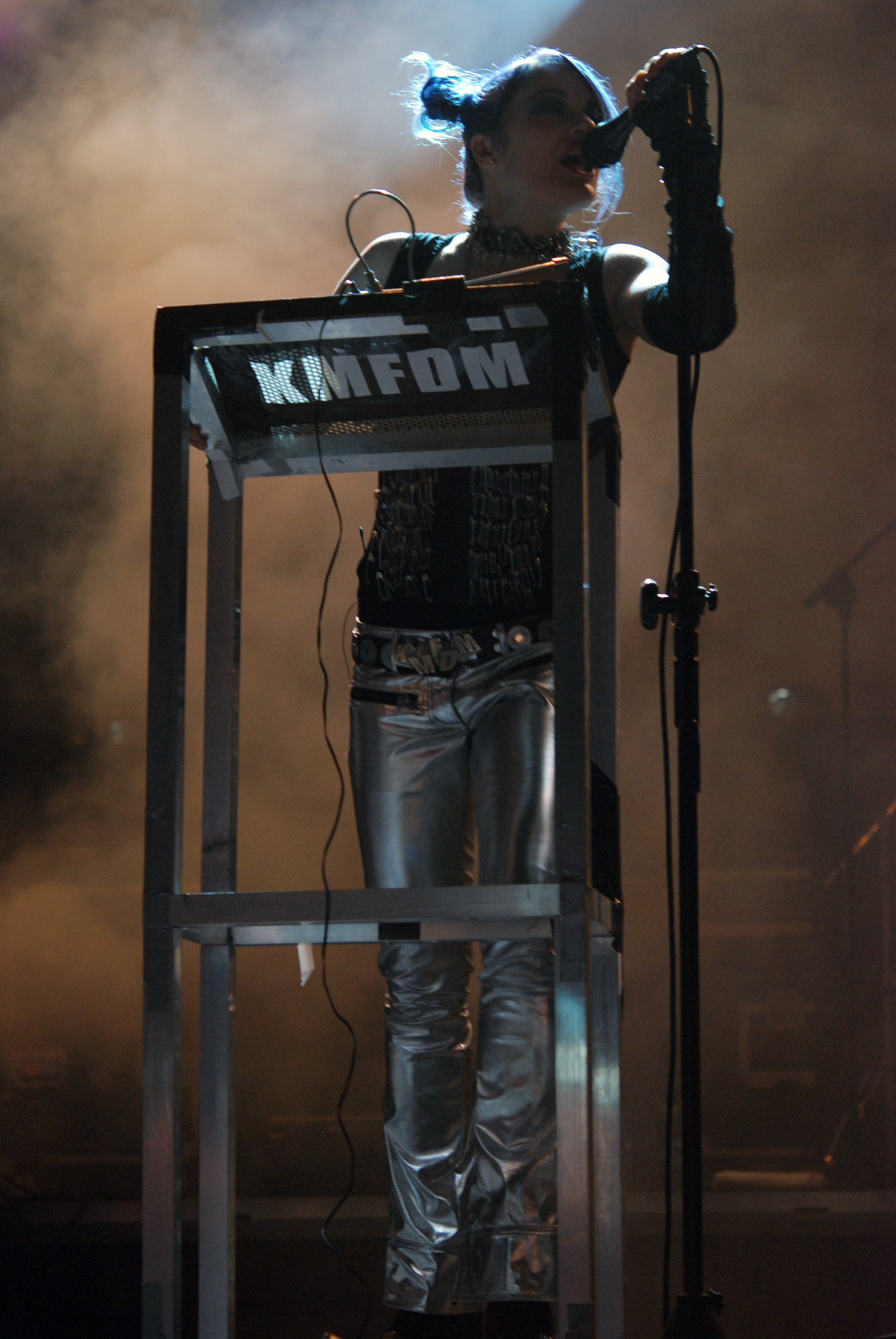
Cifarelli with KMFDM in 2009

=== KMFDM ===
- Attak (2002)
- WWIII (2003)
- Hau Ruck (2005)
- Tohuvabohu (2007)
- Blitz (2009)
- WTF?! (2011)
- Kunst (2013)
- Our Time Will Come (2014)
- Hell Yeah (2017)
- Paradise (2019)
- Hyëna (2022)
- Let go (2024)
- Enemy (2026)

=== Solo ===
- From the Land of Volcanos (2003)
- I Am Eye (2021)
- NO GOD HERE (2024)

=== Other ===
- Drill, Drill (1995)
- MDFMK, MDFMK (2000)
- Schweinstein, Schwein (2001)
- Dirty Bomb, KGC (2006)
