= Bill Rieflin =

American musician (1960–2020)

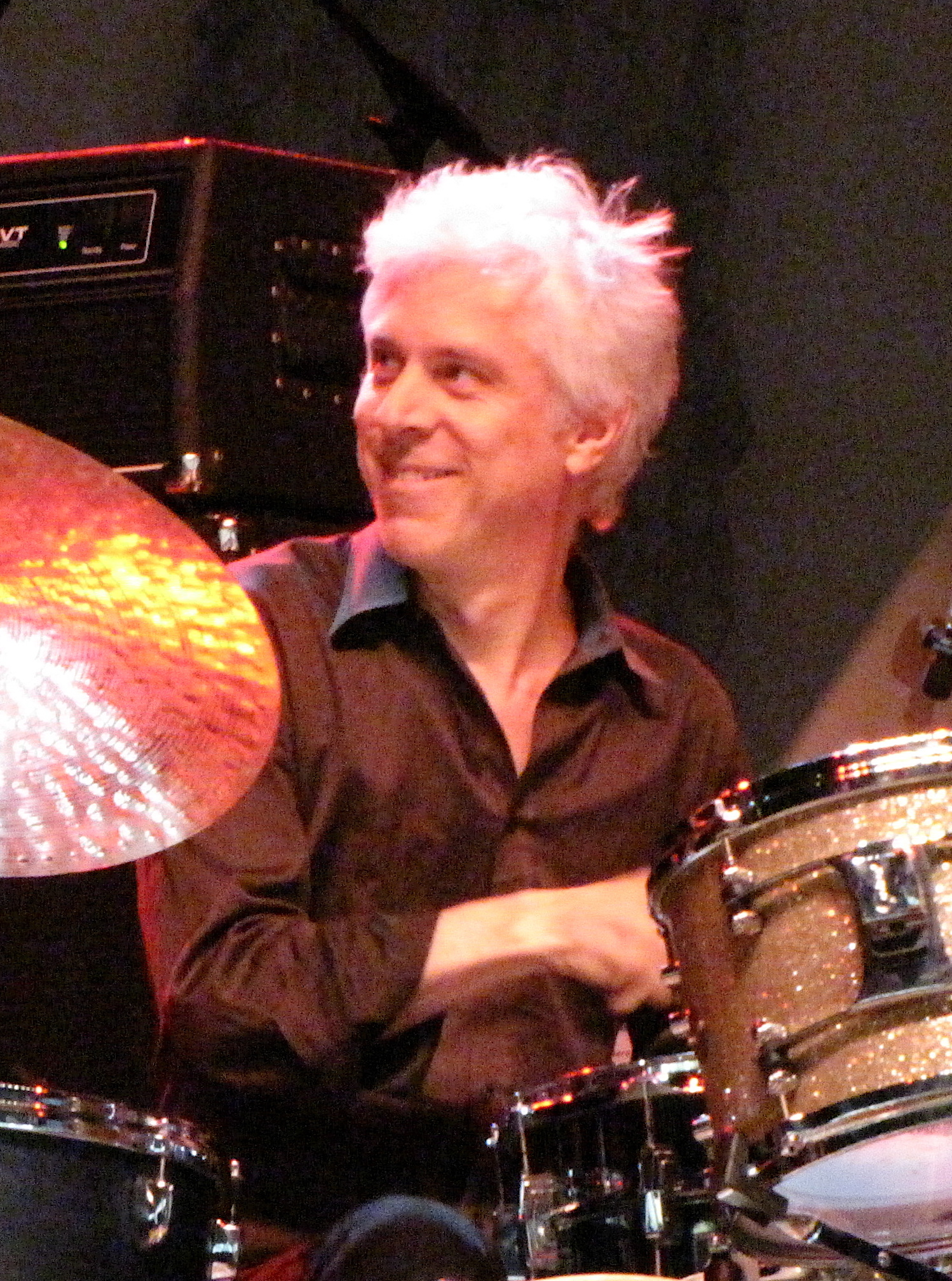
- Rieflin in 2009

Background information
- Born: William Frederick Rieflin; September 30, 1960; Seattle, Washington, U.S.
- Died: March 24, 2020 (aged 59)
- Genres: Industrial; industrial metal; industrial rock; experimental rock; alternative rock; heavy metal; progressive rock
- Occupations: Multi-instrumentalist, producer
- Instruments: Drums; keyboards; guitar; bass
- Formerly of: The Blackouts; Ministry; Revolting Cocks; Pigface; Swans; Sweet 75; KMFDM; Lard; King Crimson; Filthy Friends

William Frederick Rieflin (September 30, 1960 – March 24, 2020) was an American musician. Rieflin came to prominence in the 1990s mainly for his work as a drummer with groups (particularly in the industrial rock and industrial metal scenes) such as Ministry, the Revolting Cocks, Lard, KMFDM, Pigface, Swans, Chris Connelly, and Nine Inch Nails. He worked regularly with R.E.M. following the retirement of Bill Berry in 1997. He was a member of King Crimson from 2013 until his death in 2020.

== Career ==
=== Early years ===
Rieflin was born on September 30, 1960, and began his professional career in his hometown of Seattle. In 1975, he was in The Telepaths, a band which played backup for a couple of live gigs by The Tupperwares, which transitioned into The Screamers. He played drums for The Blackouts starting in 1979. His bandmates included Mike Davidson, Paul Barker, Roland Barker and Erich Werner. Eventually that band dissolved and Paul Barker joined the nascent Ministry.

=== Ministry, Pigface, solo work ===
Rieflin's earliest collaboration with Al Jourgensen was in 1986 on "You Often Forget", the second single by the Revolting Cocks. Later, he participated in the creation of Ministry's 1988 album The Land of Rape and Honey, and was noted for his performance in the live video In Case You Didn't Feel Like Showing Up (alongside fellow drummer Martin Atkins). Rieflin's work with Ministry and its side projects lasted through to the mid-nineties, though he noted that he was never credited as a member of Ministry proper, always as an "other" musician. Therefore, when he parted ways with the band during the Filth Pig sessions, he did not really quit since he was never an official member.

Rieflin helped Atkins kick off Pigface, the industrial collective that would grow to incorporate hundreds of artists, formed a friendship with labelmate Chris Connelly and founded First World Music. Like Connelly, Rieflin's work grew beyond his industrial roots. They collaborated on several recordings; two in particular, The Ultimate Seaside Companion (as "The Bells") and Largo, showcase Rieflin's keyboard skills.

Rieflin's solo debut, Birth of a Giant, featured him singing in something other than a background role, and also featured Robert Fripp. Improvisations from these sessions turned up later on the CD The Repercussions of Angelic Behavior, which was credited to Rieflin, Fripp and Trey Gunn.

=== KMFDM, R.E.M. ===
Rieflin appeared on all KMFDM records released from 1995 to 2003 as a drummer, programmer, vocalist and keyboardist. He toured with the band as a bassist in 2002 in support of the band's comeback album Attak and performed on the 2011 KMFDM album, WTF?!. He also drummed for Scott McCaughey's band, The Minus 5, which usually included R.E.M. guitarist Peter Buck.

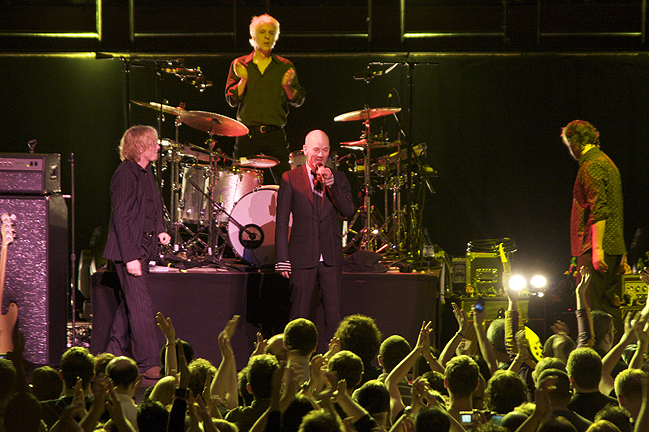
Rieflin drumming behind R.E.M. on the band's final tour in 2008

Eventually Rieflin's work with The Minus 5 led to Buck offering him the opportunity to sit in with R.E.M., who had been missing a permanent drummer since the 1997 departure of Bill Berry. The band gave him the live drummer slot in its 2003 tour. They later announced that Rieflin would fill the role indefinitely, though once again as a hired musician rather than as an official member. In recordings, Rieflin also contributed bouzouki, keyboards and guitars to the group, serving as an auxiliary member until R.E.M. disbanded in 2011.

=== Robyn Hitchcock, Slow Music, The Humans, Swans, Robbie Williams ===
Rieflin, along with Scott McCaughey and Peter Buck, was a member of Robyn Hitchcock's backing band "The Venus 3", and appeared on three Hitchcock albums, from 2006 to 2010.

Rieflin was key to forming an experimental ensemble named Slow Music in 2005 with Fred Chalenor (bassist whom he had previously played drums with in the Seattle based instrumental LAND in the late 90's), Hector Zazou, Matt Chamberlain, Peter Buck, and Robert Fripp; in this sextet Rieflin played synthesizers rather than drums. The group played a small handful of live dates in 2005 and 2006 and became inactive until 2014, when they played a few shows as a quintet due to Zazou's passing in 2008. He was also involved in a music collaboration project entitled The Humans, which consisted of him, Chris Wong, Fripp and Toyah Willcox. The band performed a series of live dates in Estonia in Autumn 2007 and 2009, and released their debut album We are the Humans in 2009. Hector Zazou's 2010 album Corps Electriques featured Rieflin, as well as KatieJane Garside, Lone Kent and nu-jazz trumpeter Nils Petter Molvær.

Rieflin was a regular contributor to Swans, playing an array of instruments from the 1995 album The Great Annihilator through 2016's The Glowing Man. (He is listed as an "honorary Swan" on the band's 2012 album The Seer.)

In 2012, Rieflin performed on drums for Robbie Williams's album Take the Crown. Later that year he produced the single Crush Vaccine for Atomic Bride.

=== King Crimson ===
In the 1990s Rieflin studied the Guitar Craft method created by Robert Fripp of King Crimson, and the men thereafter moved in the same circles and occasionally collaborated. Fripp performed on Rieflin's 1999 album Birth of a Giant, and from 2007 Rieflin was a member of The Humans, a band which featured vocalist Toyah Willcox (also Fripp's wife).

In an online diary entry dated September 6, 2013, Fripp announced a new lineup for King Crimson that included Rieflin as one of the band's three drummers. Although this particular version of King Crimson would never record a studio album, Rieflin would play live with the band for the rest of his career.

Following two-and-a-half years of touring (during which new percussion pieces incorporating Rieflin's drumming work made their way into King Crimson's live repertoire) and a few days after the first full-length live release of the band with Rieflin on board (Live in Toronto 2015), Fripp announced Rieflin's decision to take a sabbatical from the band, effective March 6, 2016. This was "a decision supported by all the Crimson Brothers." He was replaced on drums by Jeremy Stacey for the following year of group activity. In early 2017, Fripp announced that Rieflin would return to the band, but that (due to Fripp's desire to stave off complacency after several years of touring) Stacey would continue to drum for the group while Rieflin himself "[would] be focusing on mellotron, keys and fairy dusting, rather than using drums as a main instrument" in the new Double Quartet configuration. Rieflin thus became the band's first ever full-time dedicated keyboardist.

At the time of King Crimson's US Autumn 2017 tour dates in October–November, Rieflin once again needed to take time away from the group. The Seattle-based guitarist Chris Gibson temporarily covered for him on keyboards during the autumn tour. Rieflin rejoined the band in 2018 before taking another indefinite sabbatical in 2019. He was tentatively and temporarily replaced on keyboards by Theo Travis for initial rehearsals before Fripp and the band made the decision to not replace Rieflin, thus reverting King Crimson to a seven-member band. Fripp would summarise the situation as "regardless of the quality of player depping for Bill, simply, Bill is irreplaceable. It's not the notes that are played, it's the Billness of Bill that Master Rieflin brings to the group."

Although he would not appear onstage with King Crimson again, Rieflin would remain a nominal and fully-respected member of the band until his death a year later. Via retrospective footage, he played a significant part in Toby Amies' 2022 documentary In the Court of the Crimson King: King Crimson at 50, candidly discussing his terminal stage 4 colon cancer, his imminent death, and his choice to spend his final years playing music with King Crimson.

== Personal life and death ==
Rieflin was married to painter Francesca Sundsten until her death in 2019. Rieflin was diagnosed with colon cancer in 2011, and died from complications of the disease on March 24, 2020.

== Discography ==
Thistle-colored cells with daggers (†) indicate a live release

Name of release year, artist, release title and Rieflin's contribution
| Year | Artist | Title | Contribution | Ref. |
|---|---|---|---|---|
| 1988 | Ministry | The Land of Rape and Honey | Drums, programming, keyboards, guitar, background vocals | |
| 1988 | Revolting Cocks | Live! You Goddamned Son of a Bitch † | Drums | |
| 1989 | Ministry | The Mind Is a Terrible Thing to Taste | Drums, programming, background vocals | |
| 1990 | Revolting Cocks | Beers, Steers, and Queers | Drums, programming | |
| 1990 | Ministry | In Case You Didn't Feel Like Showing Up † | Drums | |
| 1990 | Lard | The Last Temptation of Reid | Drums (two tracks) | |
| 1990 | 1000 Homo DJs | "Supernaut" | Drums | |
| 1990 | KMFDM | Naïve | Drums (one track) | |
| 1991 | Pigface | Gub | Drums, guitar, bass, synthesizer, sounds | |
| 1991 | Pigface | Lean Juicy Pork | Interviewee | |
| 1992 | Ministry | Psalm 69: The Way to Succeed and the Way to Suck Eggs | Drums | |
| 1992 | Revolting Cocks | Big Sexy Land | Drums | |
| 1992 | Pigface | Welcome to Mexico... Asshole † | Drums | |
| 1993 | Revolting Cocks | Linger Ficken' Good | Drums, organ, programming, production | |
| 1995 | Swans | The Great Annihilator | Drums, sounds, percussion, 12-string acoustic guitar, sequencing | |
| 1995 | KMFDM | Nihil | Drums (three tracks) | |
| 1995 | Michael Gira | Drainland | Rhythm programming, keyboards, electric bass guitar, samples, engineering, production, arrangement, studio provision | |
| 1996 | Ministry | Filth Pig | Drums (one track) | |
| 1996 | KMFDM | Xtort | Drums | |
| 1996 | Swans | Soundtracks for the Blind | Drums | |
| 1997 | Lard | Pure Chewing Satisfaction | Drums | |
| 1997 | KMFDM | Symbols | Drums, programming, percussion, photography, sequencing (three tracks) | |
| 1997 | Sweet 75 | Sweet 75 | Drums (listed as percussion), piano | |
| 1999 | Angels of Light | New Mother | Percussion, piano, bass guitar, organ, synthesizers, acoustic guitar, backing vocals | |
| 1999 | KMFDM | Adios | Programming (one track) | |
| 1999 | Nine Inch Nails | The Fragile | Drums (one track) | |
| 1999 | Bill Rieflin | The Repercussions of Angelic Behavior | Drums, mixing | |
| 1999 | Bill Rieflin | Birth of a Giant | Drums, bass, guitar, production, vocals | |
| 2000 | Lard | 70's Rock Must Die | Drums (one track) | |
| 2001 | Bill Rieflin & Chris Connelly | Largo | Keyboards, mixing, piano, production, vocals | |
| 2001 | Land | Road Movies | Drums | |
| 2002 | KMFDM | Attak | Drums, bass, programming, synthesizers, percussion, guitar | |
| 2003 | KMFDM | Sturm & Drang Tour 2002 † | Bass | |
| 2003 | KMFDM | WWIII | Drums, vocals, loops (three tracks) | |
| 2004 | R.E.M. | Around the Sun | Drums, percussion | |
| 2005 | Slow Music | Live At The Croc 19 Oct 2005 | synthesizer | |
| 2006 | Robyn Hitchcock & the Venus 3 | Olé! Tarantula | Choir, drums, percussion | |
| 2007 | Angels of Light | We Are Him | Drums, bass, guitar, organ, percussion, piano, synthesizers | |
| 2007 | R.E.M. | R.E.M. Live † | Drums | |
| 2008 | R.E.M. | Accelerate | Drums | |
| 2009 | Robyn Hitchcock & the Venus 3 | Goodnight Oslo | Drums, vocal harmony, vocals | |
| 2009 | The Humans | We Are the Humans | Drums, bass, synthesizers, organ, production | |
| 2009 | R.E.M. | Live at the Olympia † | Drums | |
| 2010 | Robyn Hitchcock & the Venus 3 | Propellor Time | Drums | |
| 2010 | Swans | My Father Will Guide Me up a Rope to the Sky | Drums, piano, guitar, synthesizers, organ, vocals | |
| 2011 | R.E.M. | Collapse into Now | Drums, bouzouki, keyboards, guitar | |
| 2011 | KMFDM | WTF?! | Engineering, sounds (one track) | |
| 2011 | The Humans | Sugar Rush | Percussion, keyboards, bass, production | |
| 2012 | Swans | The Seer | Drums, piano, organ, guitar, percussion, synthesizers, bass, vocals | |
| 2013 | Taylor Swift | "The Last Time" | Drums | |
| 2014 | The Humans | Strange Tales | Drums, keyboards, guitar, bass, sounds, vocals, production | |
| 2014 | Swans | To Be Kind | Drums, percussion, synthesizers, piano, guitar, bass, keyboards | |
| 2015 | King Crimson | Live at the Orpheum † | Drums, percussion, synthesizers, vocals | |
| 2016 | King Crimson | Live in Toronto † | Drums, percussion, keyboards | |
| 2016 | Swans | The Glowing Man | Drums, piano, synthesizers, bass, guitar, vocals | |
| 2016 | King Crimson | Radical Action to Unseat the Hold of Monkey Mind † | Drums, keyboards | |
| 2017 | King Crimson | Live in Chicago † | Keyboards | |
| 2018 | Lead into Gold | The Sun Behind the Sun | Drums | |
| 2018 | King Crimson | Meltdown: Live in Mexico City † | Keyboards, production | |
