= Andy Selway =

English drummer (born 1970)

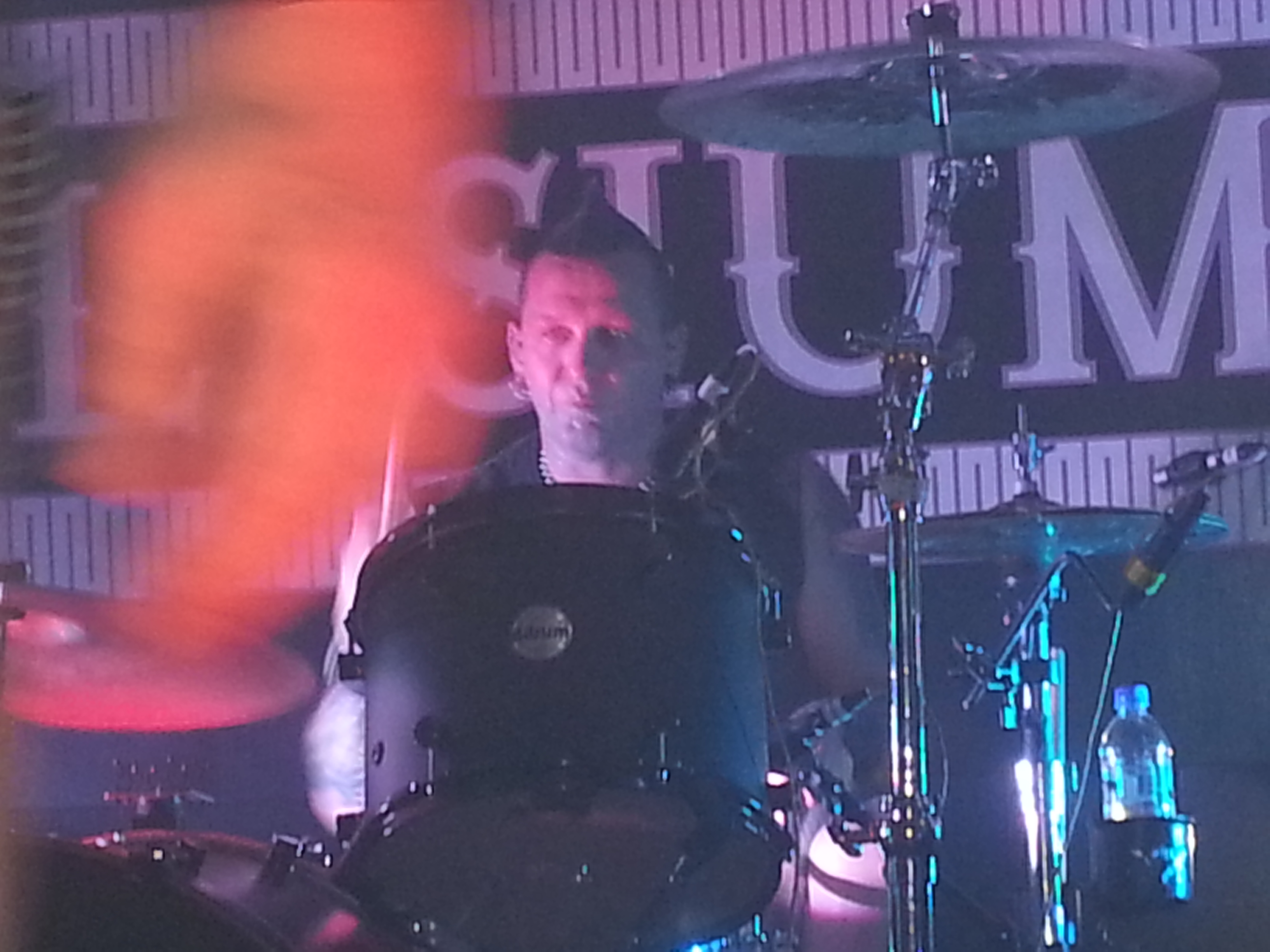
- Selway performing in 2013

Background information
- Also known as: Dutch Ovens
- Born: 3 September 1970 (age 54)
- Genres: Industrial rock, punk rock
- Occupation: Musician
- Instrument: Drums

Andy Selway (born 3 September 1970) is an English drummer, well known for his work with KMFDM.

Selway spent his early years in Luton, England, but moved to Kirton near Felixstowe, Suffolk, where he remained until his early 20s. From a musical family, he is the eldest of three brothers, the other two being proficient bass (Danny) and brass (Ricky) players.

He joined Big Boy Tomato, which enjoyed a fair amount of success in North and West London, and their 'New Wave of New Wave' sound saw them supporting bands like UK Subs and Stiff Little Fingers. The Tomatoes managed a couple of EPs, including Acton Baby and the four-track CD Hormones and Hangovers. The Tomatoes split in the early 1990s, and a splinter group emerged. Sugar Snatch took inspiration for their songs from cartoons, namely Asterix and Animaniacs. One album, Mad Cows and Englishmen, was released amidst much touring of the UK and Europe, often playing the supporting slot to Toy Dolls. Seemingly going nowhere, the band split, though two of the members went on to form The Yo-Yos, a punkabilly band formed by Danny McCormack after the 1997 split of The Wildhearts. Although signed and promoted heavily, the band never really took off, and they too split after recording a debut album.

During this time, Andy had been working with Raymond Watts (also known as PIG) and had toured Japan with the band. Realizing that he was not going to get the gigs he needed if he stayed in London, he moved to the United States, where his working partnership with Watts led to his inclusion in the lineup of KMFDM. He occasionally performs with punk band Dwarves under the alias Dutch Ovens. In late 2007, Selway played the drums for the Seattle rock band DragStrip Riot and Japanese pop star Ayumi Hamasaki in her songs "Talkin' 2 Myself" and "Decision".

In 2008, he went on tour with Genitorturers. In 2009, he toured with his KMFDM bandmate Jules Hodgson's new band, The Spittin' Cobras.

He resides in West Palm Beach with his wife, Christee Carter, and son.
