= Sascha Konietzko =

German musician and producer (born 1961)

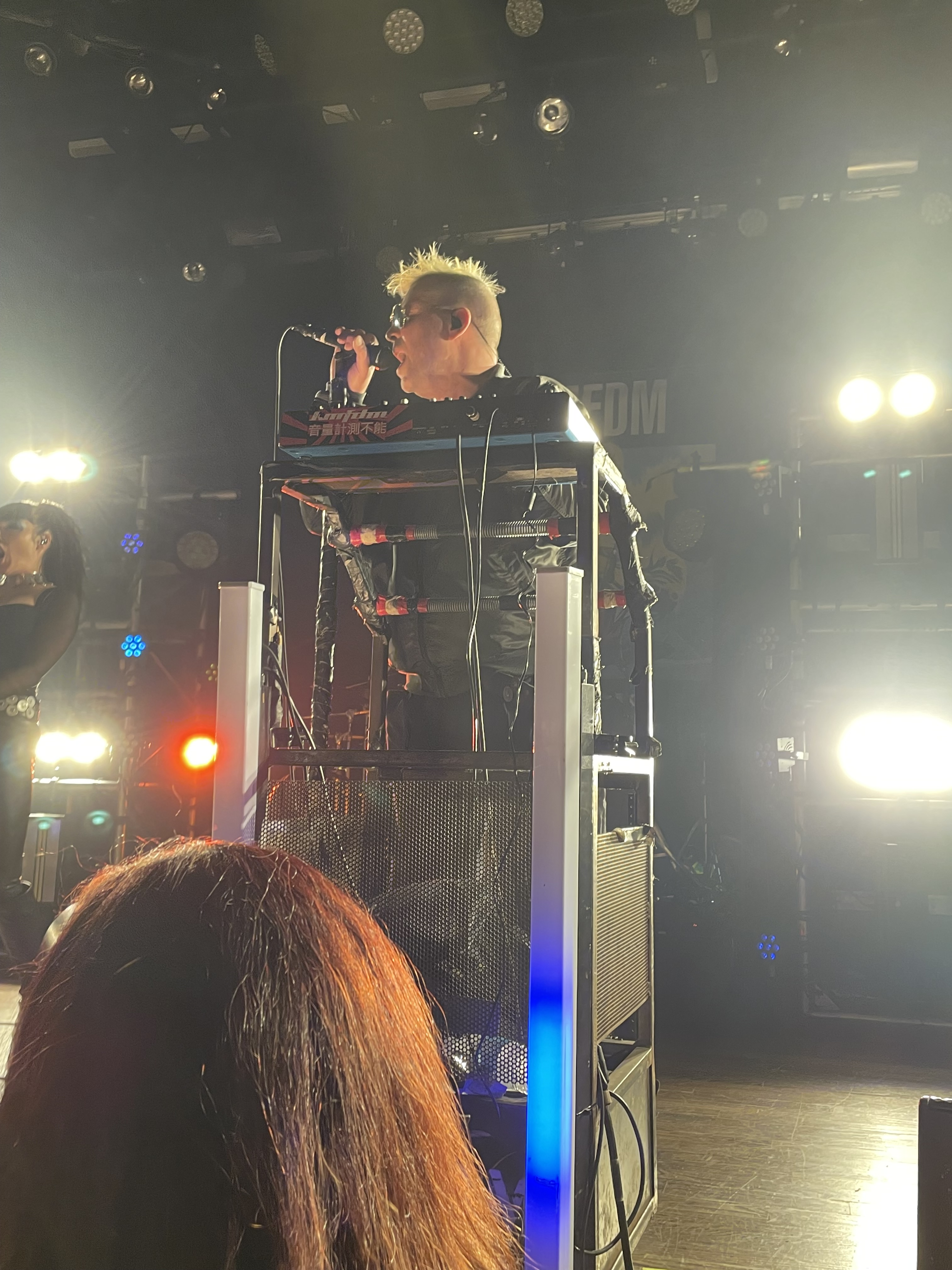
- Sascha Konietzko performing live in 2022

Background information
- Also known as: Sascha K, Käpt'n K
- Born: Sascha Kegel Konietzko; 21 June 1961 (age 65); Hamburg, West Germany
- Genres: Punk rock; industrial; industrial rock; industrial metal; EBM; experimental; hardcore techno
- Occupations: Singer; musician; record producer
- Instruments: Vocals; keyboards; drums; percussion; guitar; bass guitar
- Years active: 1972–present
- Labels: Wax Trax!; Metropolis; KMFDM; Universal

Sascha Kegel Konietzko (born 21 June 1961), also known as Sascha K and Käpt'n K, is a German musician and record producer. He is the founder and frontman of the industrial band KMFDM.

== KMFDM ==
Konietzko is best known for his role as frontman of KMFDM. Having co-founded the group as a performance art project in 1984, he is the only member of KMFDM to appear on every release, and the only founding member still in the band. His main instruments are keyboards and drums, although he is also proficient at playing guitar and bass guitar.

== Side projects ==
Konietzko has formed a number of side-projects:

- Excessive Force in 1990 with Buzz McCoy of My Life With The Thrill Kill Kult
- MDFMK in 1999 with Lucia Cifarelli and Tim Skold
- Schwein in 2000 with members of the Japanese band Buck-Tick and English musician Raymond Watts
- KGC in 2006 with Lucia Cifarelli and Dean Garcia of Curve
- OK•ZTEIN•OK in 2011, Konietzko's first solo project

== Remixes ==
He has re-mixed acts including Metallica, Megadeth, White Zombie, Rammstein, Love & Rockets, Kittie, Die Krupps, Flotsam & Jetsam, Living Colour, Mindless Self Indulgence, Combichrist, Young Gods, and Pig.

== Personal life ==
Sascha Konietzko lived in the United States from 1991 to 2007, dividing his time among Chicago, New York City, and Seattle before moving back to his hometown of Hamburg, Germany. Konietzko married fellow KMFDM member Lucia Cifarelli in 2005.
