= Foundations Forum =

Annual heavy metal music convention

Foundations Forum was the first exclusively heavy metal music industry convention, held annually from 1988 to 1997 in Los Angeles. The convention was set up by Concrete Marketing who had in January 1988 created the first industry trade magazine for the heavy metal world – Foundations. Realizing there was little or no attention or focus on this growing market, and having seen the far reaching distribution of the trade magazine, they decided to put together an annual meeting, bringing together key industry personnel, vendors and artists (and in later forums fans as well) offering advice on surviving the industry, discussing the changing climate of the scene and business, and allowing people to network.

Executive Director Bob Chiappardi summed up the purpose of the Forum:

"The way heavy metal is growing, we want to be careful not to have it blow out. By sitting down and talking about the genre, the good and the bad points, having the indies interacting with the majors, it makes for a healthy industry in general."

The forums usually invited a keynote speaker who would open the event and touch on important themes for the weekend ahead. There would be panels and workshops made up of industry personnel particular to the theme who would discuss contemporary issues and answer questions.

CD samplers of signed and unsigned artists were distributed to each forum attendee.

== Foundations Forum '88 ==
On September 30 – October 1 at the Sheraton Universal Hotel in Los Angeles, Concrete Marketing, Metal Blade Records and RIP Magazine joined forces to create the first annual Foundations Forum convention.

The theme of FF88 was the credibility and respectability of metal within the music industry as a whole. Attendance, etc.

The Keynote speaker for the event was Sharon Osbourne and it incorporated parties in honor of RIP Magazine's second anniversary and Concrete's fourth.

Panels & Moderators

Panel	Moderator(s)
Metal Marketing	Bob Chiappardi (Concrete Marketing)
Press & Publicity	Lonn Friend (RIP Magazine)
Artist Development	Diarmuid Quinn (Epic Records)
Retail & Distribution	Bill Berger (Island Records)
Metal Video	John Cannelli (MTV)
Managers & Lawyers	Walter O'Brien (Concrete Management)
Metal Radio	Derek Simon (Kiss Company)
Record Producers	Mike Bone (Chrysalis)
Credibility & Respectability	Jim Cardillo (Managing Director Foundations Forum '88)
Record Company Forum	Brian Slagel (Metal Blade Records)
Clubs, Booking & Touring	Haoui Montaug (New Music Seminar) Jennifer Perry (Avalon Attractions)
A&R in Heavy Metal	Ron Laffitte (Sanctuary Music)
Selling Metal: Retail, Touring & Press	Janie Hoffman (MCA Records) Andy Somers (Frontier Booking International)
Artist Panel	Penelope Spheeris (Dir. Decline of Western Civilization)

A two-disc compilation CD was available free of charge to those attending the event, showcasing bands that Concrete was working with.

Disc 1:

Artist	Song	Label
Keith Richards	Take It So Hard	Virgin
Winger	Hungry	Atlantic
Helloween	I Want Out	RCA
Bullet Boys	Smooth Up	Warner Bros. Records
Anvil	Blood On The Ice	Metal Blade
Queensrÿche	Revolution Calling	EMI-Manhattan
Warrant	32 Pennies	Columbia
Drive	Kamikaze	Rampage/Rhino
S.A.D.O.	On The Races	Noise
Roughhouse	Tonight	Columbia
Alien	I've Been Waiting	Virgin
The Stand	If You See Kay	Pak'er/Carlyle

Disc 2

Artist	Song	Label
House of Lords	I Wanna Be Loved	Simmons/RCA
Majesty	Fortune In Lies	Mechanic
Kix	Cold Blood	Atlantic
Jetboy	Feel The Shake	MCA
Suicidal Tendencies	Surf & Slam	Epic
Dead End	Junk	Metal Blade
Hexx	Racial Slaughter	–
Devias	Desperate	–
Wild	Hot For Love	Columbia
Mallet-Head	Fight	Frontier
Washed	Alone	–

== Foundations Forum '89 ==
Foundations Forum 89 took place from September 21–23 at the Sheraton Universal Hotel in Los Angeles. This was a week when three metal albums (by Skid Row, Mötley Crüe and Warrant) dominated Billboard's Top Pop Albums chart.

The focus of this convention was shifted more towards the development of new artists within the metal scene, emphasizing the growth and nurturing of the style.

The convention's attendance more than doubled this year to accommodate more than 2500 people, around a quarter of which were musicians.

The Keynote speaker for the event was Kiss bassist Gene Simmons.

Panels & Moderators

Panel	Moderator
Metal Workshop	Jim Cardillo (MCA)
Understanding Music Publishing	Andy Gould (Concrete Management)
Pay To Play – Controversy In The Clubs	Kenny Kerner (Music Connection Magazine)
Retail	Lou Mann (Capitol Records)
Merchandising: Your Name Here (Or Not)	Walter O'Brien (Concrete Management)
Producers/A&R	Terry Lippman (Lippman Kahane Management)
Radio	Ray Gmeiner (Elektra)
Sponsorships – Is Metal Going To Madison Avenue?	John Brodie (Westwood One)
Road Management: Don't Leave Home Without It	Ron Laffitte (Lippman Kahane Management)
International: The World, She Shrinks	Stephan Galfas (T.E. Savage Inc.)
Video: $$$ Well Spent or Spend It Elsewhere?	Rick Krim (MTV)
Press: Exposing Yourself	Ben Leimer (Circus Magazine)
A Star Is Born: The Development Of a Career	Cliff O'Sullivan (PolyGram)
Touring: Getting From The Clubs To The Arenas	Gary Bongiovanni (Pollstar)
Geraldo Goes Metal: All Access, No B.S.	Marko Babineau (Geffen)
Equipment Endorsements	Paul Sackman (Musician Magazine)
Metal Corps: The Sultans of Speed	Chris Williamson (Rock Hotel Presents)
Marketing	Bob Chiappardi (Concrete Marketing)
Artist Management: Can't Live Without 'Em & Can't Shoot 'Em	Mike Bone (Chrysalis)
Artist Panel	Lonn Friend (RIP Magazine)

The artist panel this year featured King Diamond, Robert Sweet (Stryper), Robin McAuley (MSG), Steve Jones, Lita Ford, Vicki Peterson (the Bangles), Scott Ian (Anthrax), Taime Downe (Faster Pussycat) and Anthony Kiedis (Red Hot Chili Peppers).

A double cassette named 'The Shape of Things to Come' featuring unsigned artists was given out this year along with the double disc compilation 'CD From Hell'. In a special issue of Metal Hammer, interviews were run with all the unsigned bands featured on the compilation.

CD From Hell – Disc 1

Artist	Song	Label
D.A.D.	Rim of Hell	Warner Bros. Records
Cats In Boots	Shot Gun Sally	EMI Records
Toy Roz	Sexy Lil' Devil	BG Records
The Front	Pain	Columbia Records
Lord Tracy	She's a Bitch	UNI/MCA Records
Brighton Rock	Can't Stop The Earth From Shakin'	–
Defcon	Cold Hearted	DKP Productions
Alien	Tears Don't Put Out The Fire	Virgin Records
Babylon A.D.	Hammer Swings Down	Arista Records
Fates Warning	Through Different Eyes	Enigma Entertainment
Savatage	Gutter Ballet	–
Bad Brains	With the Quickness	Caroline Records
Sleeze Beez	Screwed, Blued 'N Tattooed	Sanctuary Music
Joy Thunder	Hard Love	–
The Stand	Love Is the Reason	Pak'er Carlyle Records
Potential Threat	Rich Bitch	–

CD From Hell – Disc 2

Artist	Song	Label
Faith No More	Falling to Pieces	Slash Records/Warner Bros. Records
Shotgun Messiah	Shout it Out	Relativity Records
MSG	Save Yourself	Capitol Records
King Diamond	Sleepless Nights	Roadracer Records
Damn Cheetah	Damn Cheetah	Total Music Management
Loudness	You Shook Me	Atco Records
Suicidal Tendencies	Master of No Mercy	Epic Records
Stage Dolls	Wings of Steel	Chrysalis Records
Faster Pussycat	Poison Ivy	Elektra Records
Rude Awakening	Live Life	Rude Awakening
Metal Church	Of Unsound Mind	Elektra Records
Mordred	State of Mind	Noise Records
Powermad	Nice Dreams	Warner Bros. Records
Dirty Blonde	Passion	Outpost Entertainment
Cherri Rokkett	Lonely	Cherri Rokkett

== Foundations Forum '90 ==
Foundations Forum 90 took place at the Sheraton Plaza La Reina Hotel in Los Angeles from September 13–15, 1990. This was the first year the event was open to the public and there were over 4,000 registrants.

The theme of this year's event was based loosely around metal's emerging social consciousness and responsibility (As Bob Chiappardi notes in his message from the directors):

Responsibility on the part of the industry to nurture new talent, the responsibility of the metal community to cultivate our increasing credibility within the industry, and the responsibility of us all to react to charges that our music is potentially or intrinsically dangerous with something other than mere hostility.

Tying in with this theme, a big topic of conversation at the forum was censorship and the keynote speaker for the event was Judas Priest frontman, Rob Halford. At the time, Judas Priest had just been involved in a civil action whereby it was alleged they were responsible for the suicide of one youth from Nevada and the attempted suicide of his best friend via subliminal messages placed on one of the songs from their album, 'Stained Class'.

Although the case had eventually been thrown out of court, it was not the first of its kind and the metal world was having to defend itself against an ever-increasing number of censors.

Ozzy Osbourne, who had also been to court following the death of a teenager who listened to his music, joined his wife Sharon Osbourne and former California Governor Jerry Brown on one of the forum's panels to discuss the issue of censorship, which was a popular topic; a theme which spilled into several other panels over the weekend.

1990's forum was self-contained within the hotel and featured listening parties from Slayer, Motörhead, Scorpions, Iron Maiden and Deep Purple. Not only was there major news/press coverage of the forum, but there were broadcasts directly from the convention by MTV, KNAC, Z-Rock and others, with some being syndicated all across the country. Many will have come to cover the 18 signed bands which played at night including Judas Priest, Pantera, Exodus, Extreme, Alice In Chains and the London Quireboys. Also, during the day, there were 18 unsigned bands performing including Radar, a New York band featuring lead singer Pamela Moore who sang the part of Sister Mary on Queensrÿche's Operation: Mindcrime album.

Two commercial video cassettes of FF90 highlights were released through Strand/VCI, although these were never to be released domestically.

Panels & Moderators

Panel	Moderator
Metal Workshop	Jim Pitulski (Columbia Records)
International Panel	Derek Oliver (ATCO Records)
Music Contracts Panel	Joseph Lloyd Serling (Serling Rooks & Ungar)
Video Panel	Juliana Roberts (The Foundry)
Publishing Panel	Jim Cardillo (Warner Chappell)
Radio Panel	Kid Leo (Columbia Records)
A&R Panel	Jim Lewis (PolyGram Records)
Endorsement Panel	Joe Bosso ( Guitar World Magazine)
Music From The Underground	Howie Abrams (In-Effect Records)
Touring Panel	Jim Guerinot (A&M Records)
Marketing Panel	Jay Krugman (Columbia Records)
Merchandising Panel	Steve Gertsman (Winterland Productions)
Censorship Panel	Chris Morris (Billboard Magazine)
Biology of a Record Company	Brian Slagel (Metal Blade Records)
ASCAP Metal Songwriter Workshop	Andy Gould (Concrete Management)
Press Panel	Hanna Bolte (Epic Records)
Sexism/Racism Panel	Mike Bone (Chrysalis)
Retail Panel	Fran Aliberte (WEA)
Management Panel	Bill Elson (ICM)
Artist Panel	Lonn Friend (RIP Magazine) Riki Rachtman (Rachtman Enterprises)

The Artist Panel included Jani Lane & Joey Allen (Warrant), KK Downing & Glen Tipton (Judas Priest), Vito Bratta (White Lion), Dave Mustaine (Megadeth) and Joe Leste (Bang Tango).

As well as a cassette featuring unsigned bands, a 3CD sampler was given out at this Foundations Forum.

Foundations Forum '90 CD Sampler – Disc 1

Artist	Song	Label
Extreme	Get The Funk Out	A&M Records
Queensrÿche	Empire	EMI
Warrant	Uncle Tom's Cabin	Columbia
Vio-lence	Officer Nice	Megaforce/Atlantic
Cry Wolf	Face Down The Wishing Well	Grand Slamm
Every Mother's Nightmare	Listen Up	Arista
House Of Lords	Shoot	Simmons/RCA
Nevada Beach	Waiting for an Angel	Metal Blade
Black Sabbath	Anno Mundi	IRS Records
Two Bit Thief	Hard Times	Combat
Ministry	Thieves	(Sire/Warner Bros. Records)
Devious	Carried Away	–
Washed	Turn It Around	–

Foundations Forum '90 CD Sampler – Disc 2

Artist	Song	Label
Megadeth	Holy Wars/Punishment Due	Capitol
Pantera	Primal Concrete Sledge	ATCO
24-7 Spyz	Heaven or Hell	In-Effect
Vixen	Wrecking Ball	EMI
Trouble Tribe	Tattoo	Chrysalis
Sacred Reich	Who's To Blame	Enigma
Rhino Bucket	Blood On The Cross	Reprise
Uzi	Away From My Heart	–
Jet Boy	Stomp It (Down To The Bricks)	MCA
Valentine	Running On Luck Again	Giant
Mystic Force	Shipwrecked With The Wicked	–
Harlet	Individual We Stand	–
Antix	Jaw Dropping Beauty	–
Dorian Grey	South Side Man	–

Foundations Forum '90 CD Sampler – Disc 3

Artist	Song	Label
Anthrax	In My World	Megaforce/Island
Exodus	The Lunatic Parade	Capitol
Reverend	Scattered Wits	Charisma
Precious Metal	Downhill Dreamer	Chameleon
King of The Hill	Freak Show	SBK Records
Child's Play	Rat Race	Chrysalis
Disaster Area	This Claw	–
The Beautiful	Fine Science of Chaos	Giant Records
Scarecrow	Waiting	Cariola Records
Destruction	Cracked Brain	Noise Records
Randy Coven	Strange Cat	Guitar Recordings
David La Duke	Right From Wrong	SB Records
Joy Thunder	No Place To Skate	–
Tamer Lane	More Than A Miracle	–

== Foundations Forum '91 ==
Foundations Forum 91 took place at the Airport Marriott Hotel in Los Angeles from October 3–5, 1991. This year the forum featured an industry only day as well as the first Foundations awards ceremony. Paid attendance was up 15% on the previous year and exhibit room, directory sales, advertising, merchandising and record company participation were all up 25%.

Over half a million dollars was raised in aid of the TJ Martell Foundation, through ticket sales for the awards ceremony and at the casino night held as part of the convention.

Signed bands showcasing over the course of the three nights included Ozzy Osbourne, Soundgarden, Prong, Ugly Kid Joe, XYZ, Crimson Glory, The Almighty, Bang Tango, Claytown Troupe, Screaming Jets, Baby Animals, Lillian Axe and Asphalt Ballet.

A sponsor, Barq's Root Beer, also came on board for the first time at the convention. Noting that their target market was those aged between 12 and 24, and recognizing the growing popularity of the metal genre amongst this age group, they partnered with Foundation's Forum in order to reach their audience directly.

Panels & Moderators

Panel	Moderator
Retail Marketing	Mark Reiter (Epic Records)
Record Contracts	Donald Passman (Gang, Tyre, Ramer & Brown)
Meet The Prez	Mike Bone (Mercury Records)
Touring & Developing a Show	Larry Smith (Performance Magazine)
Sponsorships	Tom Hulett (Concerts West)
Demos	Steve Sinclair (Mechanic Records)
Press	Mike Gitter (Writer)
Publishing 101	Ira Jaffe (NEM)
Radio & Promotion	Brad Hunt (Elektra Records)
Managers	Merck Mercuriadis (Sanctuary)
Crossover – Rap/Alternative/Metal	Tom Whalley (Interscope)
Biology of a Record Company	Mike Faley (Metal Blade Records)
Artist Panel	Lonn Friend (RIP Magazine)
Career Opportunities & Self Defense in the Music Business	Jim Cardillo (Warner/Chappell Music)

The artist panel this year included Mike Muir (Suicidal Tendencies), Ricky Warwick (The Almighty), Chris Cornell (Soundgarden), Jeff Ament (Pearl Jam), Phil Anselmo (Pantera), Dweezil Zappa, and Harry James and Luke Morley (Thunder).

Awards Ceremony

The first Foundations Awards ceremony was to recognize the significant contribution made by key artists to the heavy metal genre and the music industry as a whole. The proceeds were donated to the TJ Martell Foundation and the ceremony featured performances by Blind Melon, Temple of the Dog, Alice in Chains and Megadeth. The MC for the event was MTV's Riki Rachtman and awards presenters included Ronnie James Dio, Paul Stanley and Gene Simmons, Lemmy, Rick Rubin, Penelope Spheeris and Rikki Rokkett.

AWARDS

- Lifetime Achievement Award: Ozzy Osbourne
- Best Debut Album: Alice in Chains
- Best Hard Rock Band: Queensrÿche
- Top Artist (Radio Album): Megadeth – Rust In Peace
- Top Artist (Radio Cut): Megadeth – Hangar 18
- Top Artist (Retail): Queensrÿche – Empire
- Best Thrash Band: Megadeth
- Best Hard Alternative Band: Jane's Addiction
- Best Video (Single Cut): Slayer – Seasons in the Abyss/Janes Addiction – Been Caught Stealing
- Best Album Art: Jane's Addiction – Ritual de lo Habitual
- Top Independent Artist (Retail): Napalm Death – Harmony Corruption
- Top Home Video: Faith No More – Live at Brixton
- Top New Artist: Pantera

Foundations Forum 91 Sampler CD – Disc 1

Artist	Song	Label
War Babies	Blue Tomorrow	Columbia Records
Soundgarden	Jesus Christ Pose	A&M
Fates Warning	Point of View	Metal Blade/Reprise
McQueen Street	When I'm In The Mood	SBK Records
Screaming Jets	Needle	rooArt/Mercury
Voivod	Clouds In My House	Mechanic Records
Crimson Glory	The Chant	Atlantic
Lillian Axe	Body Double	Grand Slamm Records
Skatenigs	Loudspeaker	Wax Trax Records
Pasafire	Suck on This!	–
David LaDuke	Takin' My Chances	SB Records/Productions
Bernward	Rock'n'Roll Revolution	Inferno Music (Berlin)
Dead On	Lost At Sea	Dead On Records/Mausoleum
Skara Brae	Sweet Alibi	–

Foundations Forum 91 Sampler CD – Disc 2

Artist	Song	Label
Slick Toxik	Big Fuckin' Deal	Capitol Records
Scatterbrain	Big Fun	Elektra Entertainment
Claytown Troupe	Devil's Highway	EMI
The Bogeymen	Killing Ground	Delicious Vinyl
Naked Sun	Rite To Life	Noise Entertainment
Arcane Opera	Time Slips Away	–
Tourniquet	Psycho Surgery	Intense Records
Gunslingers	Rock-City	–
Scorcher	Still A Long Way From Home	–
Rude Awakening	The Bell	–
Annihilation	Fourth Reich	–
Eudoxis	Reach The Sun	–
Belfast	Make Up Your Mind	–

Foundations Forum 91 Sampler CD – Disc 2

Artist	Song	Label
The Almighty	Crucify	Polydor
The Scream	Tell Me Why	Hollywood Records
Lucy Brown	Colorblind	Megaforce/Atlantic
The Hard Corps	Hard Corps	Interscope
Baby Animals	Early Warning	Imago Recordings
Frontrunner!	Time To Say Goodbye	–
Voxen	Shadows of a Broken Heart	–
Criss Cross	Tears From Heaven	–
Amazone	Stop Talking	–
Moxy Lama	It Doesn't Matter	–
Heartless	Baby Jane	–
Gypsy Kyss	Somewhere With Somebody Else	–
Disaster Area	Reign of Chaos	–
Casino Drive	Groovin' Bomb	–

This year a video cassette entitled 'A Weekend in Hell' was released through A&M Video. The video featured performances from bands like Megadeth, Soundgarden, Ugly Kid Joe, Prong, Screaming Jets and XYZ. Also featured were excerpts from panel discussions, awards acceptances and exhibits, serving as a taster for those who could not make it to the event itself.

== Foundations Forum '92 ==
Foundations Forum 92 took place at the Stouffer Concourse Hotel in Los Angeles from October 1–3, 1992. The theme of the convention on its fifth anniversary was the 'evolution of the genre' – exploring where they stood musically, and where they were likely headed.

Foundations Forum 92 was the venue for the World premiere screening of For Those About to Rock – Monsters in Moscow featuring AC/DC, Metallica, Pantera and Black Crowes.

Having established the ceremony the previous year, on Saturday night the Concrete Foundations Awards took place as part of the events at the hotel.

AWARDS

- Top Retail Album: 'Metallica' – Metallica (based on Foundations Charts)
- Top Radio Cut: 'Mouth For War' – Pantera (based on Foundations Charts)
- Top Radio Album: 'Metallica' – Metallica (based on Foundations Charts)
- Top Home Video: 'Rusted Pieces' – Megadeth (based on Foundations Charts)
- Best Independent Artist: Sepultura (Editors Choice Award)
- Best Breakthrough Artist: Pearl Jam (Editors Choice Award)
- Best Hard Music Artist: Soundgarden (Editors Choice Award)
- The Hard Rockers' Hard Rocker Award: Aerosmith (Award chosen by their professional colleagues)

On the closing night of the convention, the TJ Martell Gambling Casino made another appearance in order to raise money for the charity, following success the previous year.

Panels & Moderators

Panel	Moderator
Radio Seminar	Don Kaye (MJI Metalshop)
Ragin Retail; How May We Help You?	Susan Greenwood (MCA) Ed Bunker (BMG)
Independent Labels; President's Conclave	Brian Slagel
Marketing And The New Technology	Mike Shalett
European Market	Harry Doherty (Metal Hammer)
Platinum Case Studies	Diarmuid Quinn
Getting Your Foot in the Door(and keeping the door open)	Jim Cardillo
Feedback From The Fans: A Panel in Reverse	Cheryl Valentine (Mercury) Dyana Kass (Hollywood Records)
Hard Music: The Evolution of The Genre	Mike Gitter
Independent Labels: Surviving in Interesting Times	Mike Faley (Metal Blade)
Workshop: Artist Endorsements	Josh Rikelman (Guitar for the Practicing Musician)
Legal Workshops	Joseph Serling (Serling, Rooks, Ungar)
European Marketing: Press & Publicity	Harry Doherty (Metal Hammer)
Press: Past, Present & Future	Kim Kaiman (Levine/Schneider Public Relations)
Marketing Yourself	Marc Reiter (Epic Records)
A&R Panel	Mike Bone (Def American Recordings)
Get Into The Ring With Lonn Friend	Lonn Friend
Workshop: So You Wanna Be A Guitar Hero?	Jonathan Rheingold (Guitar World Magazine)
The Artist Panel	Steve Isaacs (MTV)

Brian Slagel's (Metal Blade) Independent Labels Presidents Conclave was a significant meeting for those rock/metal labels which, despite a fair amount of individual success, were under represented at other industry conventions or rarely had their voices heard. This meeting covered significant topics like international distribution, domestic distribution, marketing, merchandising, touring and publicity, and gave the indies a chance to discuss the problems and concerns they shared.

Foundations Forum '92 Sampler CD 1

Artist	Song	Label
Cathedral	Autumn Twilight	Columbia Records
Extreme	Rest In Peace	A&M Records
Kyuss	Green Machine	Chameleon Records
Dead, White & Blue	Chills	MCA Records
Non-Fiction	Reason To Live	Grand Slamm Records
Cannibal Corpse	Hammer Smashed Face	Metal Blade Records
Copperhead	Busted	Mercury Records
David La Duke	Love My Baby	SB Records & Tapes
T-Ride	Fire It Up	Hollywood Records
Praxis	Crash Victim Crash Science Navigator	Axiom/Island/PLG
Blackjack	To Thine Own Self Be True	–
Tragic Romance	Love and Revolution	Mother America Records
Vertical After	Sellout	Undergrowth Records
Skeleton	Hit The Floor	–

Foundations Forum '92 Sampler CD 2

Artist	Song	Label
Circle of Soul	One Man's Poison	Hollywood Records
Animal Bag	Hate Street	Stardog/Mercury Records
Skew Siskin	If The Walls Could Talk	Giant Records
Exodus	A Good Day To Die	Capitol Records
Forte	Mein Madness	Massacre Records
Crystal Pistol	Heart of Stone	–
Condemned	Addictive	Sounds of Seattle records
Scorcher	That Look In Your Eyes	–
Abby Normal	Yard of Toys	–
Totem	Come Fly With Me	–
Eyewitness	Can't Stop	–
Lazarus	Intracranial Mass	–
False Face Society	Confessor	–
Repulsa	I Never Promised You a Rose Garden	–

Foundations Forum '92 Sampler CD 3

Artist	Song	Label
Pantera	Cowboys from Hell (Live in Moscow)	Warner Home Video
Arcane Opera	Words That Heal	–
Emerald Zoo	What's It Gonna Do For You	–
Hard Knox	Run For The Money	–
Schnitt Acht	Rage	Cheetah Records
Cyperus	Sanity Management	Summit Records
Aragathor	Jury of Spyders	–
Rampage	Your Rules	–
Deadline	Do You Believe	–
Crash 9-teen	Sandra Scream	–
Scarred For Life	So Trashy	–
Yvette D'Luxe & The Ugly Bastards	Stripicide 1&2	–

== Foundations Forum 93 ==
Foundations Forum 93 took place from September 9, 1993, to September 11, 1993, at the Burbank Hilton and Convention Center in LA.

Artists showcasing at this year's event included Kiss, Scorpions, Schnitt Acht, Souls at Zero, My Sisters Machine, The Big F, Accept, Quicksand, La Salle, The Scream, I Mother Earth, Greta, Mind Bomb, Strip Mind, White Trash, Tad and Crowbar.

Panel	Moderator
Rock Intensive Radio	Matt Pollack (Atco Records)
College Radio	Toxic Tommy Delaney (Concrete Marketing)
Independent Distribution	Craig Minor (Valley Record Distribution)
Youth Marketing; Getting a Piece of the Pie	Jim Cardillo (Warner/Chappell)
Do Your Own Press	Jodi Jacobsen (A&M Records)
Understanding Soundscan	Mike Fine (SoundScan)
The Changing Face of Retail	Lou Mann (Capitol Records)
Do Your Own Videos	Peter Spirer (Metropolis Productions)
Understanding BDS	George Chaltas (BDS)
Kids Say The Darndest Things	Mike Fine (SoundScan)
International Panel	Harry Doherty (Metal Hammer)
College Radio 101 (Workshop)	Toxic Tommy Delaney (Concrete Marketing)
Media & Technology: Reshaping the Music Biz	David Santaniello (Columbia Records)
Women's Opportunities	Gerri Miller (Metal Edge)
Doing Your Own Demos	Ross Elliot (Ross Elliot Management)
Ask Mr Slagel	Brian Slagel (Metal Blade)
Legal Workshops	Joseph Serling (Serling, Rooks & Ungar)
War Stories: A View From The Trenches	Lonn Friend (RIP Magazine)
Press Panel	Chris Morris (Billboard Magazine)
Booking Yourself	Dan DeVita (Circular Evidence)
Merchandising	Felix Sebacious (Blue Grape Merchandising)
The Politics of Pot: Music, Mores and Marijuana	Harry Crossfield (High Times Magazine)
Takin It to the Streets; Marketing Hard Music in the 90s	Brad Pollak (A&M Records)
Publishing	
Interactive Media	Scotty Page (Interactive)
A&R Panel	Danny Goldberg (Atlantic)
Artist Panel	Michael McKean (Spinal Tap, Airheads)

The artist panel this year featured Jerry Cantrell (Alice in Chains), Stevie Blaze (Lillian Axe), Jesse DuPree (Jackyl) and Rob Zombie (White Zombie).

Foundations Forum 93 CD Sampler Disc 1

Artist	Song	Label
Shootyz Groove	The Crave	Mercury Records
Damn the Machine	I Will	A&M Records
The Big F	Wicked Thing	Chrysalis/ERG
Souls at Zero	Grey World	Energy Records
Prong	Snap Your Fingers	Epic Records/Concrete Management
Mercyful Fate	Is That You Melissa	Metal Blade
David La Duke	Rock and Roll Fever	SB Records & Tapes
Iron Maiden	Hallowed Be Thy Name	Capitol Records
Schnitt Acht	The War Has Begun	CDG Records
Galactic Cowboys	Ranch on Mars	Geffen Records/Concrete Management
Spiders and Sankes	2000 Rock and Roll	–
Nasty Licks	Silence Man	–
Bullzai	Stay	–
Ivory Tower	Hit and Run	–
Cold Ethyl	Hammerdown	–

Foundations Forum 93 CD Sampler Disc 2

Artist	Song	Label
The Scream	Kool World	Hollywood Records
Flotsam & Jetsam	News To Me	MCA Records
Haze & Shuffle	Whatch Ya Do With Me	Arista
Love/Hate	Spinning Wheel	–
Paradise Lost	True Belief	Metal Blade
Lonn Friend & Dave 'Snake' Sabo	I Dismember You	–
Kyuss	Demon Cleaner	Chameleon Records
Angels in Exile	Time For a Killing	–
Clockhammer	Losing A Thousand Days	–
Mutha's Day out	Locked	Chrysalis
Ikki Crane	Time and Again	–
Mary Suicide	Taste Me	–
Muzza Chunka	Float	Arista Records

Foundations Forum 93 CD Sampler Disc 3

Artist	Song	Label
Stick	Grind	Arista Records
The Almighty	Powertrippin'	Polydor records
I Mother Earth	Not Quite Sonic	Capitol Records
Sugar Tooth	Black Queen	Revolution/Capitol Records
Tad	Greasebox	Mechanic/Giant
White Trash	Minor Happiness	Elektra
Dogma	Crying Souls For The Damned	–
Vertical After	Crime Pays	Undergrowth records
Soulgrind	Lost and Found	–
School Boy Crush	To Your Knees	–
Untaymd	Desperately Delirious	–
Double Action	No Man's Land	–

== Foundations Forum '94 ==
Foundations Forum '94 took place at the Burbank Hilton Hotel in LA from September 7–9, 1994. The special address was given by Ted Nugent and Mercury Records provided a launch party at the Palace in Hollywood featuring performances by the Mighty Mighty Bosstones, Animal Bag, Shootyz Groove, Downset and Kerbdog.

Bands showcasing this year included Bile, Biohazard, Bruce Dickinson, Downset, Dream Theater, Drown, Fates Warning, Korn, Machine Head, Yngwie Malmsteen, Monster Voodoo Machine, My Head, Overkill, Wickerman, Wool, Dead Orchestra, Engines of Aggression, Juster, Wood, Paradise Lost, Planet Hate, Po' Boy Swing, Pushmonkey, Raven, Blackthorne and Vertical After.

Panel	Moderator
Commercial Radio	Sue Naramore (Geffen Records)
College Radio	Sharon Joffe (Arista Records)
Independent Labels	Tom Lipsky (CMC International)
International 'Europe: Independent Route to Success'	Andy Black (Music For Nations)
Management Workshop	Jim Pitulski (Round Table Entertainment)
Grammy Professional Forum	National Academy of Recording Arts and Sciences
Retail Focus Group	Bob Cahill (EMI Records)
'Is There Life After Death?'	Frank Dancsecs (Ace's Records)
Publishing Workshop	Dexter Moore (BMI)
Maximising Video Exposure	Souxsie Crawford (Bohemia Afterdark)
Guitar Clinic	Yngwie Malmsteen
College Radio 101	Chainsaw (Mechanic Records)
Consumer focus Group	Dyana Kass (Hollywood Records) Linnea Nann (Warner Bros. Records)
More War Stories	Dee Snider
Free Legal Advice	Joseph Serling (Serling Rooks & Ungar)
Marketing	Jayne Simon (Geffen Records)
Press	Katherine Turman (RIP Magazine)
Emerging Radio Technologies	Susan Greenwood (MCA Records)
Pick Brian's Brain	Brian Slagel (Metal Blade)
Women's Opportunities	Gerri Miller (Metal Edge Magazine)
Touring	Andy Gould (Concrete Management)
Underground Press	Jerry Rutherford (CuriousGoods)
Engineering Workshop	Freddie Piro (Ocean Studio)
A&R Panel	Brian Slagel (Metal Blade)
Legal Workshop	Joseph Serling (Serling, Rooks & Ungar)
Artist Panel	Vanessa Warwick (MTV Europe)

Foundations Forum '94 CD Sampler – CD 1

Artist	Song	Label
White Zombie	Children of the Grave	Columbia Records
Fates Warning	Outside Looking In	Metal Blade Records
Monster Magnet	Negasonic Teenage Warhead	A&M Records
C.O.C	Broken Man	Columbia Records
Gilby Clarke	Cure Me... Or Kill Me	Virgin Records
Machine Head	Davidian	Roadrunner Records
David La Duke	Satisfaction (A Stones Tribute)	SB Discs and Tapes
Silence	Sound of the Rain	CEG Records
Joey Vera	Laughing in the Light	Metal Blade Records
Mobius	Filling My Shoes	–
Mary's Magnet	Number Nine	–
Paradise Lost	True Belief	Music For Nations
Hate Face	Skin	–

Foundations Forum '94 CD Sampler – CD 2

Artist	Song	Label
Animal Bag	Spirits of Grass	Mercury Records
Wool	Kill The Crow	London Records
Carcass	Embodiment	Earache/Columbia Records
Drown	Transparent	Elektra Records
Bourbon Lies	Love Me One More Time	–
Reason Being	The Vibe	–
Metal Sky Craz	Hot Girl Tonight	–
Vertical After	Stab the Cheese	Undergrowth Records
Bullets 4 Breakfast	Extreme Hostile Intent	Coldwar Records
Arsinal	The Window	–
Mystic Force	Divinity Within (Reach for Tomorrow)	–
Ramrod	Listen... As I Die	–

Foundations Forum '94 CD Sampler – CD 3

Artist	Song	Label
Arcade	Angry	Epic Records
Testament	Low	Atlantic Records
LAROXX	Suicide	–
Frontline	Heaven Knows	Signo Records
Talon	Cold Hard Ground	–
Blister'd Toad	Lost Child	–
Swamp Candles	The Philadelphia Song	–
Dirty Dealin	Remember	–
Bad Angels	Borderline	Skull Train Records
Alien Strange	Final Exit	–
Illegal	The Opponent	–
Cinnamon	Stanley	–

Foundations Forum '94 CD Sampler – CD 4

Artist	Song	Album
My Head	Carnasaur	Imago Records
Dream Theater	Lie	Eastwest Records
Atomic Opera	Joyride	Collision Arts/Giant
Wicker Man	Shitkicker	Imago Records
Aerosol	Death of a TV Junkie	Stone Lizard Records
Rising Sun	Gypsy Arabian Caravan	–
Bad Biscuit	Masturbation	Cathedral Records
Fat Bastid	Soldier	–
Snydley Whiplash	Dizzy Space	Hard As A Rock Productions
Brood	Lack of Motivation	–
Vicious Rumours	No Fate	GTM Management
Ultra Violet Vinny	PNB	–
Peace Sanctuary	No Pain	Hard as a Rock Productions

== Foundations Forum '95 ==
Foundations Forum '95 was hosted from Thursday September 7 – Saturday September 9, 1995 by the Burbank Hilton in Los Angeles, California. It was to be the last forum of its kind, with plans for a new format taking shape for future meets.

Panel	Moderator
Active Rock Radio: An Alternative to What?	John Fagot (Hollywood Records)
The College Metal Radio Gameshow	Smitty (Epic Records)
Independent Distribution	Lou Gerard Musumeci (Feedback Distribution)
Europe: Melting The Metal	Carsten Stricker (Verstarker)
Underground Video	Beth Lasch (F# TV)
Demo Critique	Marc Ferrari (Red Engine Music)
Retail Panel	Ray Godas (Concrete Marketing)
Canada: Northern Exposure	Lyle Chausse (CFOX)
Underground Press	Mike Diana
College Radio 101: Building The Better Metal Show	Jill Castellano (Victory Records)
HArd Rock In The 90s	Gerri Miller (Metal Edge Magazine)
The Japanese Market	Kuni Takeuchi (Virgin/EMI)
Publishing Workshop	Ron Sobel (ASCAP)
Even More War Stories	Peter Criss (Kiss)
Publicity: The Anatomy of a Good Interview	Don Kaye (Kerrang/Pure Concrete)
Marketing: Doing More With Less	Jim Cardillo (Warner Chappell)
Pick Brian's Brain	Brian Slagel (Metal Blade Records)
How to Get a Record Deal	Joseph L. Serling (Serling, Rooks & Ungar)
London to Longbeach: Generations of Punks	Bill Stevenson (All)
Developing Technologies: The Future of Marketing	Fred Ehrlich (Columbia Records)
Management Workshop	Marc Reiter (Q Prime)
Free Legal Advice	Joseph L. Serling (Serling, Rooks & Ungar)
Touring	Nick Light (Mercury Records)
Introduction to the Internet	Alarik Skarstrom (Skartrax Entertainment)
Profile of the Hard Music Audience	Mike Shalett (Soundscan)
Grammy Hard Music Forum A&R Panel	Mike Bone (IRS Records)
Artist Panel

Foundations Forum '95 Sampler CD – Disc 1

Artist	Song
Season to Risk	Bloodugly
Monster Magnet	Look To Your Orbs For The Warning
Down	Stone The Crow
Mr Mirainga	Double Martini
GZR	The Invisible
Skold	PAMF
David La Duke	Psychedelic Sandwich
Sea of Souls	Water
Shrine	Sadistic Love
Movida	Against It All
Spine	Lotion
Mortal Remains	Welcome

Foundations Forum '95 Sampler CD – Disc 2

Artist	Song
Excel	Unenslaved
Super Junky Monkey	Buckin The Bolts
Six Feet Under	Silent Violence
Mindride	Boot
Metal Sky Craz	Exotating
United	Revenger
Endless Distrust	Trauma
Supafuzz	Bushhog
Stonehenge	Until
Tamisry	Wasted Time
Odyssey	And Justice For Some
Mindset	Curse
Kill Culture	The Hate

Foundations Forum '95 Sampler CD – Disc 3

Artist	Song
Testament	The Legacy
Dimestore Hoods	Life In The Asylum
Sly	Shut Up & Buy
Big Fear	Someday
The Art of Zapping	SOS
Royal Hunt	Wasted Time
1000 Mona Lisas	Girlfriendy
Vertical After	Summoned to Swill
Dragon Aerogator Band feat. Agent 3	You Were The One I Hated
World Bang	Skin
Dark Truth	Garden of Stone
Amethyst	Hardwear
Chapter Seven	The Question

Foundations Forum '95 Sampler CD – Disc 4

Artist	Song
Paw	Death to Traitors
Sullen	Mr Mister
Godhead	The Answer
Souls at Zero	Strip
Cybicus	The Truth of The Game
Strain	Bite
Rahowa	The Snow Fell
Love Lode	Butterhorn
Sufferbus	Metamorphine
Sonipath	Brace Yourself
Stanley	Low Maintenance Man
GMS	The Beginning

== F MusicFest '96 ==
As indicated the previous year, the event took on a different format for the meeting in 1996. The organizers decided this year to return to their roots and rather than doing another convention under one roof, they chose instead to branch out. Rather than feature 30 bands under one roof, they presented over 200 of them across 16 clubs from in and around the Hollywood and West Hollywood area. The name also changed from Foundations Forum, to F Musicfest, and the line up changed to become more varied in terms of genre than in previous years. Key elements remained from conventions past including the many panels and a focus issue – this year, drugs.

Concrete/Foundations presented the Outstanding Contribution to Music Award to Van Halen during the event.

Panels this year included:

Panel	Moderator
The NARAS Panel: Sex, Death & Rock n Roll	Mike Green (NARAS)
College Radio: Buying Indie Street Cred	Kim Burke (Concrete Marketing)
Retail: Life in The Cash Lane	Dutch Cranblitt (Hollywood Records)
Tour Marketing	Jennifer Perry (Hear We Go Again)
Press/Publicity: About Face	Roy Trakin (HITS)
New Technology: What Does This Button Do?	Rob Lord (Rocktropolis)
War Stories: 10 Years After	Rudy Sarzo (Sarzo Music)
Soundtracks: The Big Score	John McHugh (Tristar)
Music Biz 101	Jess Taylor (LA Music Network)
Publishing: The Other A&R Folks	Jim Cardillo (Warner/Chappelle)
Radio: Good Morning... You're Fired.	Mike Halloran (KUPR)
The Velvet Rope: Vital Music Industry Pipeline or Record Business National Enquirer?	Julie Gordon (The Velvet Rope)
Management: The Babysitters Club	Paul V (Cloudbreak Management)
Indie: Is The Dream Alive?	John Szuch (Deep Elm)
Radio: All Stations Created Equal, But Some More Equal Than Others	Roland West (KITS)
A&R Demo Critique: Reality Check	Hugo Burnham
Artist Panel: The Great Attender

Venues and Showcases

Moguls: Melvins, Knapsack, The Lemons, Jimmy Eat World, 3 Penny Needle, Three Mile Pilot.

Teaszer A: Coal Chamber, Downset, Abscess, Strife, Bloodlet, A.O.A., Nothingface, Ramp, I.4.N.I., The Back Alley Gators, the MF Pitbulls, Sexpod, NEar death Experience, The Violet Burning, Dead Birds, Padded Cell, Cynical, Tribe 8.

Smalls: Copperpot, Sunset Heights, Ms. 45, Punkinucle, Stone, Suncatcher, Chopper One, Frank Lloyd Vynl, Volebeats, Haynes Boys, Jackie On Acid, Tongue, The Black Watch, Ether.

The Viper Room: Revolux, 9 Iron, Likehell, Cellophane, Epperly, Choreboy, Brand New Unit, Coal, Placebo, Slightly Stoopid, Metal Molly, Les Claypool, Holy Mackerel, The Underbellys, The Ziggens.

The Martini Lounge: Super Junky Monkey, Crowbar, Hed, Drill, Dimestore Hoods, Killing Culture, Mind Heavy Mustard, Foreskin 500, Spahn Ranch, HeadCrash, The Notwist, Skold, 16Volt.

Hell's Gate: Hollow, Mindrot, Flambooky, December, Torment, Shoegazer, The Phoids, Stanley, Jud, Scraggly Jane, Cradle of Thorns, The Drugs, Wingnut Supreme.

Roxy: Sugartooth, Snot, Powerman 5000, Flood, Man Will Surrender, Salmon, Expanding Man, Agnes Gooch, Silver Jet, Plexi, Ednaswap, triplefastaction, Beer Nuts, Humble Gods, Lidsville, Frontside.

Palace: Ugly Kid Joe, Motörhead, W.A.S.P., Supersuckers, House of Pain, Unwritten Law, 22 Jacks, Save Ferris, B-FAM, LA Guns, Warrant, Body Count, Stuck Mojo.

Troubadour: Maids of Gravity, Remy Zero, Haynes Boys, Perfect, Thermadore, Horny Toad!, Buck O Nine, Nerf Rider, Meal Ticket, The Grabbers, Mensclub, Johnny Bravo, Dakota Wildflowers, Sludge Nation.

Opium Den: Lo Preshur, Tories, Dashboard Prophets, Reejers, Fat Army, Lawsuit, Godplow, Don Knotts Overdrive, Battershell, FroSTed, Pennydreadful, haynuckle.

Whiskey: Kilgore Smudge, Man Is The Bastard, Brutal Juice, Neurosis, Red Dye No. 5, Wardog, Galactic Cowboys, Sacred Reich, Flotsam & Jetsam, Dogma, Molly Maguire, Far, Samiam, Crawlspace, Lit, Extra Fancy.

Jack's Sugar Shack: Smart Brown Handbag, Neverlast, Her Majesty The Baby, Inflatable Soul, Zoe, Kevin Hunter, Tribe of Gypsies, The Bill White Acre.

Luna Park 1: Radar Bros, Negro Problem, Black Moon Graffiti, Sparkler, Love Jones.

Billboard Live: Palomar, Five-Eight, Sweet Vine, Haynes Boys, Fountains of Wayne, Super 8, The Verve Pipe, Sufferbus.

Jack's: Customers, Blues Saraceno, Belltower, Bigelf.

== F MusicFest '97 ==
Panels this year included:

Panel	Moderator
Tour Marketing	Larry Weintraub (A&M Records)
Lifestyle Marketing: Sports Marketing & The Music Industry	John Boyle (Extreme Consulting)
Music Industry 101: Learn From The Pros	Elliot Cahn (Cahn Man)
Artist Development	Alan Brown (Warner Bros. Records, Reprise)
Retail	Jason Whittington, Geffen Records
Merchandising	David Johnson (J Artist Management/Merch)
Music Publishing	Ira Jaffe (Famous Music)
Press/Publicity	Roy Trakin (HITS)
War Stories: The Truth Is Out There	Tommy Nast (Album Network)
Anatomy of a Record Contract	Paul Menes (Menes Law Corp)
Internet Marketing	Todd Steinman (Warner Bros.)
Management	Dave Frey (Silent Partner)
Getting Signed: The Next Day	Tony Ferguson (Interscope)
A&R Demo Critique	Hugo Burnham (EMI Publishing)
Radio: College, Young Guns In Radio, Metal Radio Evolution
Artist Panel

Venues & Showcases

Hollywood Palladium: Offspring, L7

Opium Den: Other Star People, The Four Postmen, Farmer, DJ Sean Perry, Fluorescein, Amnesia, Sparkler, Tomorrowpeople, Wild Colonials, Dogstar, Mr Mirainga, Triple Fast action. The Risk Records Showcase was also held here and featured the Autumns, Go! Dog! Go!, Jack Off Jill and Ozomatli.

Alligator Lounge: Mineral, Crumb, Knapsack, Slush, Pink Noise Test, Number One Cup and Regatta 69

Whisky A Go-Go: Nebula, Lit, Salmon, Slo Burn, Killingculture, Anthrax, Sevendust, Crushed. Camel also presented a night here featuring Limp Bizkit, Silver Jet and aMiniature.

Billboard Live: The Uninvited, Long Beach Dub Stars and Big Elf.

Coconut Teazer: Swamp Boogie Queen, Mother Superior, Blake Morgan, Rat Bat Blue, Lucid, System of a Down, Flambookey, Manhole, Aunt Betty, Monet, Tree of Love, Lilyvolt, No.9.

Highland Grounds: Elmore Lang, Clear, Nick St Nicholas, Michael Monarch.

The Palace: Sly, Quiet Riot, Raven, Green Jelly, Strapping Young Lad, Exodus and Testament.

Jack's Sugar Shack: Michelle Lewis, Jason Faulkner, Brent Fraser, Phil Cody, Tim Burlingame, Crown Jewels, Honky, The Piersons, The Hutchinson, Maria Fatal, The Love Revival, Coal and Marshall Coleman.

Martini Lounge: Dubwar, Sparkmarker, Cast Iron Hike, Voodoo, Rubberneck, Near Death Experience, Hollow, Def Con Sound System, Skrew, Mess, the Drugs, Flood, Loungefly and Fat Amy.

Moguls: Plastiscene, Gorgeous, Vitapup, Yortiose, Los Cincos, Plimpton and Clawhammer.

Roxy: Events at the Roxy kicked off with the Geffen Records showcase featuring Extra Fancy, Human Waste Project and Total Chaos. BAM Magazine also held a party here with performances from Sexpod, Powerman 5000, Incubus, Spank and Hed PE. Other bands performing here as part of the festival included The Aquabats, Amen, Vitamin L, Dial 7 and Backside.

Viper Room: The Cunninghams, Issa Joone, Daddy Longhead, Beer Nuts

The Garage: Stillsuit, Will Haven, Ignite, Strife and Snapcase

Atlas: Liquid Soul
