= Jimi Beach =

American entrepreneur (born 1971)

- Beach in Austin, Texas in 2011
- Born: November 26, 1971; Titusville, Florida, United States
- Other names: James Beach Drummond, Jimmy Beach
- Occupations: Inventor, Product Designer
- Known for: Brand Builder, Entrepreneur Coach

James Beach Drummond (born November 26, 1971) is an American inventor, entrepreneur and product designer based in Orlando, Florida. He invented the artificial intelligence technology used for the StreetLogic Network, and is the designer of a lightweight personal flotation device that won Best of Show for technical apparel at ICAST, the world's largest sport-fishing trade show.

He is known as an advocate for independent arts, and regularly promotes up-and-coming artists through the marketing programs of the companies he operates.

As an artist, Beach is known for using "natural elements", "nature's rhythms", and "water as art".

== Career ==
=== Musician ===
In 1992 Beach was a founding member of the surf-rock band Lo Presher based in Central Florida. Lo Presher recorded three albums and toured the surf industry circuit with a rhythmic act that featured homemade percussive instruments made from alligator skulls, turtle shells and bamboo. The New York Times described the band’s music as “wooden drums and didgeridoo added to hard-rock and punk”.
In 1996 Lo Presher approached Warped Tour founder Kevin Lyman with a proposal to organize an independent artist stage which became known as the Surf Compound. The band went on to manage, produce and perform on this independent stage through their own indie record label, EVREC Productions, from 1996 to 1999.

=== Designer/inventor ===
==== Bluworld of Water ====
In 1998 Beach used profits from tours and album sales as capital to launch a concept that combined his love for water and art. Bluworld of Water, started by Beach and his brother Sean Drummond, has grown into the largest commercial and residential indoor water feature company in the world. Beach served as the creative force behind the brand until 2005, and has been referred to as the world's foremost authority on water art and design.

Beach and Drummond were featured on CNBC’s The Big Idea with Donny Deutsch in 2008 to discuss the rapid success of Bluworld.

Beach pioneered the concept of “water as art”, selling water sculptures. The company partnered on a furniture line with renowned spokesmodel and design entrepreneur Kathy Ireland.

In 2003 Beach was commissioned by Fiji Water to design an installation for Mercedes-Benz Fashion Week (New York Fashion Week) at Bryant Park in Manhattan, NY.

The lifestyle magazine Robb Report labeled Beach as "one of the country's leading water artists,"

==== Fratello International ====
Beach’s experience as a nightclub designer and owner inspired him to develop a brand concept for a line of distilled spirits, which resulted in the creation of Bong Spirit Vodka. Beach chose the controversial bottle design based on its symbolism as a communal object, and the cultural role it has represented for decades as an underground icon in the arts and entertainment community.

Beach debuted Bong Spirit in December 2005 at Art Basel in Miami Beach and created a marketing program called Spirit of the Brand that allows up-and-coming artists the opportunity to design artwork for the company's bottles. Bong Spirit uses proceeds from the art bottles to promote indie arts by organizing regional exhibitions, concerts, and bottle signing events.

In 2007 Beach selected the top finalists from hundreds of design submissions from around the world and debuted the winning bottle designs at an exhibition in Austin, Texas featuring art from such recognized street artists as Shepard Fairey, Aidan Hughes, Istvan Orosz, Vulcan, and Art Spiegelman.

In 2008 Bong Spirit Vodka was launched in select international party destinations such as Ho Chi Minh City, London and Macau.

Beach has won several design awards for the bottle concept, innovative marketing programs and designer accessories for Bong Spirit Imports

In 2010 Beach won the Platinum Medal at the Spirits International Prestige for the best overall package design out of 162 brands submitted from around the world.

On September 22, 2010 Bong Spirit Imports, LLC was acquired by Millennium Prime, Inc (OTC: MLMN), and currently operates as a subsidiary of the company. Millennium Prime is a developer, acquirer and marketer of lifestyle brands and enters lifestyle product markets to establish business units focused on brand categories.

==== Talent Database ====
In 2007 Beach launched the Global Talent Database, a free talent search engine and artist directory, similar to a global Yellow Pages for talent and creativity. The network’s servers suffered a catastrophic failure from a cooling system malfunction in 2009, rendering the project unrecoverable and in need of a rebuild that is said to be planned for the near future.
Beach was the editor and author of Talent Speaks, an artist blog centered around "a discussion of advancements in technology and the subsequent increased amount of opportunities for self-employed and independent artists."

==== Lifeshirt ====
In June 2015 Beach announced the development of an inflatable life jacket-type device designed to achieve a Level 50 performance rating established by the International Organization for Standardization (ISO). Beach cited the purpose for the invention is due to the fact people are not regularly wearing the current bulky PFDs and loss of life due to drowning can be directly attributed to this fact.

In July 2015, Lifeshirt won the Best of Show Award for technical apparel at ICAST, the world's largest sportfishing tradeshow. Lifeshirt was selected for the top award among a field of 889 products submitted by 270 companies.

In 2015 Beach won the “Innovation in Life Jacket Design Competition” which were announced at the International Boat Builders Exhibition and Conference in Louisville. Sponsored by the BoatUS Foundation for Boating Safety and Clean Water and the Personal Floatation Device Manufacturers Association (PFDMA), a team of five judges from the boating, paddling and life jacket manufacturing industry reviewed nearly 250 contest submissions from as far away as Mongolia and New Zealand.

==== StreetLogic - Intelligent Mobile Retail ====
Beach is the inventor of the StreetLogic mobile retail technology, an intelligent software platform that enables retailers to mobilize their operations to fulfill off-premise sales. Upon the launch of StreetLogic's delivery and last mile logistics platform, Beach said, "Convenience and quality are completely driving the new digital economy, and retailers should be careful how they choose to fulfill off-premise sales."

On June 5, 2020, StreetLogic technology won the Brand Experience Award for Last Mile & Fulfillment Experiences by RetailX. The award spotlights businesses that are redefining the rules of interaction, engagement and loyalty.

=== Producer ===
==== The Surf Compound ====
From 1996 to 1998 Beach co-produced the “Surf Compound” on the Vans Warped Tour, which provided a platform for prominent action sports athletes and musicians such as Tom Curren, Donavon Frankenreiter, Kelly Slater, Mark McGrath, Peter King, and Ray Bones.

==== Rhythm of Nature ====
In 2003 Beach wrote and directed Rhythm of Nature, a theatrical production featuring percussion instruments and tribal rhythms with Cirque du Soleil performers personifying the notions of water, rhythm and dance.

==== Bandwagon Roadshow ====
In 2010 Beach launched the Bandwagon Roadshow, a concert festival series combining national interest in car culture and popular music. Bandwagon was named “Best New Event Launch of 2010” by BizBash Magazine. In September 2010, Beach started an internet-based radio station called RadioBandwagon that serves as the centerpiece for the series’ promotional marketing, and features more than a dozen themed radio shows that support the car culture lifestyle.

In 2011 Beach signed a broadcast deal with Fox Entertainment for a TV show entitled "Bandwagon: The American Roadshow", a release date has yet to be set.
