= DJ Magic Mike =

American record producer (born 1966)

- Also known as: Mike Hampton
- Born: Michael Hampton; May 9, 1966 (age 60)
- Origin: Orlando, Florida, U.S.
- Genres: Miami bass; electro
- Years active: 1986–present
- Labels: Cheetah; Magic; NMG Entertainment; Ravesta; Crown; Mo' Wax
- Website: djmagicmike.com www.twitch.tv/djmagicmike01

DJ Magic Mike (born Michael Hampton, May 9, 1966) is a Miami bass record producer, rapper, and the first platinum selling recording artist from Orlando, Florida. He is also a former member and former lead vocalist of the rap trio Vicious Bass along with rappers DJ Lace & MC Madness.

== Career ==
He was born in Orlando, Florida, United States. Magic Mike made his debut in the world of Miami Bass productions when he met Miami based producer/rapper Rod Whitehead (of Pryme Tyme fame) in 1986. Rod enlisted Mike as a DJ for his upcoming projects on Miami's Suntown Records, but after Mike reviewed the deal offered by label owner Edward Meriwether, he left the label, project unfinished. Shortly after while performing cuts on the radio, he received a call from Beat Master Clay D to add cuts on an upcoming project for rappers MC Cool Rock and MC Chaszy Chess. This resulted in his first recorded work, Boot the Booty. However, Mike often found himself in the producer's chair by default while working with Clay D, and always remained uncredited. During this period, he also was called into Vision studios to add cuts to songs he had no creative input on, such as Chilla Frauste's Get Up, Get Down, Get Funky, Get Loose and Popular Demand's Don't Clock Me.

After working for Clay D and Vision Records, he returned to Orlando and landed a solo deal with the then unknown Cheetah Records, releasing his first batch of solo singles in 1988. Those led to a full-length album in 1989 entitled "DJ Magic Mike and The Royal Posse", which featured many guest crews and rappers all based on his production and turntable antics. His following album Bass is the Name of the Game in 1990 saw the Miami Bass genre reach a zenith both creatively and commercially.

Much like most other Miami Bass producers, Magic Mike's music was never exclusively Miami Bass, but also aimed for the traditional Hip-Hop market. Eventually, he teamed up with MC Madness as his primary rapper during his more Hip-Hop oriented days, although there was no exclusive deal for this, and Mike continued on, collaborating with artists such as Sir Mix-a-Lot and Techmaster P.E.B.

Despite his history with Miami Bass and his overwhelming catalog of straight ahead hip hop, he has also made a mark in the Florida breaks scene, including a track titled "2001" while alongside DJ Infiniti and the 2005 single release "Cowbell". A compilation featuring instrumental versions of many of his hits was published by Mo Wax.

Magic Mike had a long time Sunday night residency at House of Blues at Downtown Disney in Lake Buena Vista, Florida at their Service Industry Night. He currently plays every Friday Night at Ember in his hometown of Orlando. Magic Mike also continues to tour across the United States of America, as well as internationally.

== Personal life ==
DJ Magic Mike is the cousin of fellow producer and turntablist DJ Scratch.

== Discography ==
=== Studio albums ===
| Year | Album | Label | Peak chart |
|---|---|---|---|
| 1989 | DJ Magic Mike & The Royal Posse (with A.T.S, DJ Lace, M.C. Boo, MC Madness, M.C. Toney B) | Cheetah Records | RIAA: Platinum |
| 1990 | Bass Is the Name of the Game | Cheetah Records | RIAA: Gold |
| 1991 | Ain't No Doubt About It (with MC Madness) | Cheetah Records | RIAA: Gold |
| 1991 | Vicious Bass (with DJ Lace, MC Madness) | Cheetah Records | Billboard 200: 153; Top R&B/Hip-Hop Albums: 51 |
| 1992 | Southern Hospitality (with T.Isaam) | Cheetah Records | |
| 1993 | Bass: The Final Frontier | Magic Records | RIAA: Gold |
| 1993 | This Is How It Should Be Done | Magic Records | |
| 1994 | Represent | Magic Records | |
| 1994 | Bass Bowl | Magic Records | |
| 1995 | Bass Is How It Should Be Done | Cheetah Records | |
| 1996 | Don't Talk Just Listen | Cheetah Records | |
| 1996 | Back in Bass (with Techmaster P.E.B.) | Newtown Music Group | |
| 1998 | Bad Boys of Bass (with Quadmaster Uno) | Crown Records | |
| 1998 | Gods of Bass (with Techmaster P.E.B.) | Newtown Music Group | |
| 1998 | Scratch 'N' Bass | Plus Cool | |
| 1999 | The Ghost Is Back (with DJ Lace, MC Madness) | Newtown Music Group | |
| 1999 | The Journey | Mo' Wax | |
| 2000 | Magic's Kingdom | Restless | |
| 2000 | Bass Journey | Newtown Music Group | |
| 2012 | Beyond The Magic | Elektro Aktive Music | |
| 2021 | Another Dimension | Independent | |
