= Lo Presher =

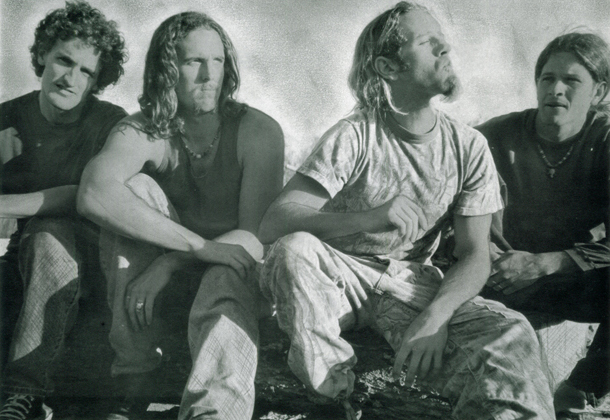
- Lo Presher in 1994

Background information
- Origin: Brevard County, Florida, United States
- Genres: Rock, surf rock
- Years active: 1992–2003
- Labels: Everything Records; EVREC
- Website: www.lopresher.com

Lo Presher is an American rock band formed in 1992 in Brevard County, Florida. The band released three studio albums and toured extensively, including performances on the Vans Warped Tour. The band is usually classified under Surf Rock, but fans are credited with labeling their style as Tribal Alternative, a musical movement popular in the U.S. underground independent scene of the late nineties, of which the band is credited for influencing. They are best known for their work on musical soundtracks for extreme sports videos and for their live, theatrical percussion performances in which they play homemade instruments. The band's name is sometimes credited as Lo Pressure or Low Pressure

== Biography ==
Lo Presher was formed in 1992 in Titusville, Florida, by brothers Thaddeus Cranston and Nate Cranston and lifelong neighborhood friend Jimi Beach. Drummer Patrick Wilkey became a member in 1994. The group made their indie record debut in 1992 with The Dreamstorm Collection, which found favor in the underground surf community. Songs from the album appeared on various feature length surf films and attained international distribution.

After shunning interest from a variety of independent record labels, the band decided to create their own production company and formed Everything Records (EVREC) in 1995. Throughout the mid-nineties the band, acting as the production company, produced several showcases and events that promoted other up and coming bands and DJ's throughout the state of Florida (US). Earthvibe held in June 1995 at the Volusia County Fairgrounds in Daytona Beach, Florida helped to mark the early careers of such notable DJs as Andy Hughes, Chang, and DJ Sandy.

In late 1995, the band teamed up with world champion surfer/musician Tom Curren on a national tour to promote Ocean Aid, a non-profit environmental awareness agency. The tour was visually archived by Sonny Miller, one of the surf culture's most celebrated and respected cinematographers. Tour stops along the East Coast often spawned impromptu jams and cameo appearances by several noted musicians such as world champion surfer/musician Kelly Slater and David Setgast founder of the famous surf music haunt, the Groove Tube in Indialantic, Florida.

The band continued to create music for extreme sports and movie soundtracks including the Surf NRG series by Surfer magazine's Kevin Welsh who claimed "Lo Presher is one of my favorite bands, those guys are definitely a unique, creative group of individuals."

In 1996, the band teamed with manager Jim Hayek to record their second LP Icon Jungle in Miami, Florida. Hayek approached Warped Tour founder Kevin Lyman with the band's proposal for an Independent Artist Stage and sponsor area known as the Surf Compound. The band went on to manage, produce and perform on this independent stage throughout the 1996 tour. That year, the stage notoriously showcased the talents of several notable underground bands such as The Tom Curren Band, Donavon Frankenreiter's Sunchild, Mark McGrath's Sugar Ray, Peter King, and the X-Members featuring Ray Bones of the famous Bones Brigade skate posse.

In 1997 the band toured again with the Vans Warped Tour, sharing the tour bus with Swedish punk band, Millencolin. During this period the band was sponsored by Jägermeister, and contributed to an indie promotional program called the Jägermeister Music Tour. Notable performances included a show at Hollywood California's famed Opium Den, where the band introduced their homemade percussive instruments known as "spikestands" to the press.

In 1999 the band recorded Indigenous Species at Full Sail Studios in Orlando, Florida. The album was dedicated to the firefighters that fought to save Lo Presher's wooded studio from the Florida firestorms that raged across the state that year.

Lo Presher's last live performance was at the House of Blues in Orlando on July 26, 2003. Plans for a reunion show are said to be in the works. Thad and Nate Cranston continue to produce soundtracks for Everything Records and Jimi Beach has become a recognized artist responsible for creating the designer brands Bluworld of Water and Bong Spirit Vodka.

== Homemade instruments and the electronic music scene ==
Lo Presher's popularity has been attributed by many to the tribal percussive performances that the band closed each live show with. Raised in the wooded swamps and seashores of Central Florida, the band constructed electronically wired percussive instruments, called spikestands, out of natural elements found in their rural surroundings. Bamboo, alligator & hog skulls, and turtle shells all provided eye-catching striking surfaces that were then wired with MIDI triggers and routed to a sampler. In a tribute to natural rhythm, all four members would come off their traditional instruments and play a percussion finale called "The Spear".

Lo Presher's rhythmic percussion performances were associated with the emerging rave and electronic music scene in Florida during the mid-1990s. During this period, Lo Presher headlined several notable events, including Cosmos, Earthvibe, and the Zen Festival, as well as performances at Visage, a rave club in Orlando. The performances frequently featured accompanying Hawaiian fire knife dancers and visual projections.

== Pro-environment ==
Lo Presher was known throughout the surf and music industry for supporting environmental causes. As long standing members of the Surfrider Foundation, the band often played benefit concerts and sponsored beach cleanups. In 1995 the band toured in support of Ocean Aid with professional surfer and musician Tom Curren. Many of Lo Presher's songs were centered on environmental issues. The band's name is derived from "low pressure", symbolic spirals found throughout the natural world, that generate energy.

== Members ==
- Thaddeus Cranston - lead vocals, guitars, spike stands,
- Nate Cranston - guitars, vocals, didgeridoo
- Jimi Beach - bass, percussion, vocals
- Patrick Wilkey - drums
- Lee Towles – (1993) drums
- David Mancini – (1992) drums
- Chris Pariso – (2002-3) guitar, producer
- Jim Hayek - (1996–1998) manager
- Monica Cieri – tour manager
- Sean Drummond – production
- Clint Siddens – production

== Trivia ==
- In 1994, the band worked a part-time stint for MGM Studios and served as the house band for the Mickey Mouse Club (MMC). The band played on the live set in support of a young Justin Timberlake, Britney Spears, Christina Aguilera, JC Chasez, and Keri Russell.
- Surf legend Tom Curren used to "chill out" for extended periods at Lo Presher's hidden wooded studio in Florida during the mid-nineties.
- Lo Presher's recording and rehearsal studio, known as the "Bat Cave" was surrounded by an out-of-control fire storm in 1999. Forestry helicopters airlifted water from a nearby river and saved the complex.

== Discography ==
=== Albums ===
Year	Title	Label	Format	Other information
1993	The Dreamstorm Collection	Everything Records	CD/Cassette	First album.
1996	Icon Jungle	Everything Records	CD	Recorded in Miami, Florida.
1999	Indigenous Species	Everything Records	CD	Recorded at Full Sail Studios, Orlando, Florida.

=== Compilation albums ===
Year	Title	Label	Format	Other information
1997	New Music for a Jägermeistered Society	Sidney Frank Importing Co.	CD	Produced and arranged by Jeff Agdern / Sidney Frank Co.

=== Videography ===
Year	Title	Label	Format	Other information
1991	SurfNRG Volume 1	SurfNRG Videos	VHS	Produced by Kevin Welsh
1992	IslandNRG	SurfNRG Videos	VHS	Produced by Kevin Welsh
1993	LiquidNRG	SurfNRG Videos	VHS	Produced by Kevin Welsh
1994	NuclearNRG	SurfNRG Videos	VHS	Produced by Kevin Welsh
1995	Feral Kingdom	Rip Curl - World Wave Productions	VHS	Produced by Sonny Miller
1995	BlueNRG	SurfNRG Videos	VHS	Produced by Kevin Welsh
2000	NRG2000	SurfNRG Videos	VHS	Produced by Kevin Welsh
2002	Red Tide<	One Eyed Productions	VHS	
2003	Pure Surf	One Eyed Productions	VHS	
