= Cheetah Records =

American record label

- Founded: 1988
- Status: Defunct
- Distributor: Cheetah Distribution Group (CDG)
- Genre: Miami bass, hip hop, techno, industrial

Cheetah Records was started in Orlando, Florida by Tom Reich and Jan Hrkach in 1988. The record label distributed music belonging primarily to the rap music subgenera Miami Bass.

Cheetah started small with Reich selling tapes out of the trunk of his car. Cheetah's growth accelerated after Orlando native DJ Magic Mike was signed to the label and quickly generated most of Cheetah's sales. Other acts including Radioactive Goldfish (old school Techno) and Schnitt Acht (industrial) were also handled by Cheetah but they failed to match the sales volume generated by Magic Mike. Reich later started two addition record labels: Bush Baby Records and Magic Records, where the later featured Magic Mike exclusively. All three record labels were later consolidated under the Cheetah Distribution Group (CDG). Some people claim that the CDG was the largest independently distributed record label in America at that time. Magic Mike left Cheetah in 1995 and CDG folded in 1996.

== List of Bands ==
- DJ Magic Mike
- Schnitt Acht
- Vicious Bass
- Radioactive Goldfish
- Erotic Exotic

== See also ==
- List of record labels
