= Eudoxis =

Canadian thrash metal band

- Origin: Montreal, Quebec, Canada
- Genres: Thrash metal
- Years active: 1984–1993; 2020–2024
- Past members: J.P.Perrault; Rick "Raz" Raczko; Sotiri Papafylis; Mario Gilles; Mark Hill-Anderson; Mars B. Alexander; Leiv Arnesen; Stephane Rioux; Ronnie Theriault

Eudoxis was a Canadian thrash metal band formed in Montreal, Quebec, in 1984. They released the Metal Fix demo and video in 1985. The video received extensive airplay on the Canadian cable channel MuchMusic's Power Hour. This was followed by the 1986 EP Attack from Above and the 1991 LP Open Fire. The video for "Reach the Sun" was featured at the Los Angeles Foundations Forum in 1991 and still airs on both Much Music and Musique Plus.

They performed in spiked body armor and the drummer's kit included massive, 5-foot-4-inch-long (1.63 m) by 24-inch-wide (0.61 m) stainless steel bass drums. Eudoxis are credited as having the longest and loudest bass drums on record.

The 1991–1992 Open Fire tour featured the light show of Pierre "Metal Monk" Gendron and included songs written for their next album which was never released since Eudoxis disbanded in 1993. Deeply rooted in the philosophy of Socrates, the books of Homer, and the psychology of Freud, Sotiri Papafylis' lyrics dealt with the perils of war, torment, insanity, and triumph. Rick "Raz" Raczko explored the full potential of the bass guitar as a melodic lead instrument. This use of his custom-made graphite neck, five-string bass is exemplified on the introduction of the song "Omnipotent Phantasies" and on their instrumental epic "Reflections of a Lost Past". A new generation of Canadian metal bands regard them as musical influences and their releases have become classics treasured by fans and collectors around the world.

In 2006, Eudoxis were asked to reunite for a large Canadian heavy metal festival but this long-awaited reunion was not to be. Mars B. Alexander relocated to Toronto and formed Mars Project in 2004. Sotiri Papafylis currently sings and plays blues harmonica with Back Sabbath (a Black Sabbath tribute band).

In 2018, a compilation CD of their complete recordings entitled The Gathering was released via German label Ragnarök Records. In 2023, a reunited Eudoxis released the album Evil God's Fetish which is available on CD and all digital platforms. The reformed lineup consisted of vocalist Sotiri Papafylis, drummer J.P. Perrault, and founding members Rick "Raz" Raczko and Mark Hill-Anderson. Hill-Anderson directed this album's music video "Lies".

== Attack from Above ==
Eudoxis' first single, was Attack from Above. Only 1000 copies of this vinyl record were pressed. This two-song EP, recorded at Lamajeure Studios, Montreal, was released in 1986, one year after their demo and video for the song "Metal Fix" which received regular airplay on MuchMusic's Power Hour. A more polished version of "Metal Fix" appears on side 2. Side 1 features the title track "Attack from Above". Leiv Arnesen drew on his years of service in the United States Air Force as an Aircraft Armaments Systems Technician (462), in writing the title track. It was inspired by those who huddled together in fear in London's many air raid shelters during the Battle of Britain. Rick "Raz" Raczko (bass) and Stephane Rioux (drums) founded Eudoxis in 1984 and they appear on this record. Original vocalist Leiv Arnesen (Leiv Armageddon) left the band in 1987 and was replaced in 1989 by singer/songwriter Sotiri Papafylis. Ronnie Theriault (guitars) was also replaced in 1989 by ex-Axewraith guitarist Mars B. Alexander.

== Open Fire ==
Eudoxis' first studio album, Open Fire was recorded in Montreal at Silent Sound studio in the summer of 1990 by Graeme Scott and Morris Apelbaum. It was mixed at Karisma studio by Bryan "Rock Pig" Martin. This full-length LP was released in 1991 accompanied by the video for "Reach the Sun" (produced by David Jeidekin) and featured the songs "Tormented We Fall" and their theme song "The Gathering". The songs were written by Sotiri Papafylis (vocals), Rick "Raz" Raczko (bass), Mars B. Alexander (guitar), and J.P. Perrault (drums). Mario Gilles was recruited as a second guitar player to recreate the dual guitar parts live. The album cover illustration is a painting by Jean-Francois Mayer. This album was released under the band's independent Shell Shock label and was distributed in Canada, Germany, Japan, Greece, and the United States. The band ceased to exist in 1993 but through the internet and collectors, this album has spread to the UK, Poland, Croatia, Russia and South America.

== The Gathering ==
Eudoxis' only compilation CD was released in 2018 by Ragnarök Records (an underground German label). This compilation celebrated Eudoxis' thirty-fifth anniversary and included their complete recordings along with two songs by Screen (a band consisting of four Eudoxis members from the Open Fire era).

== Evil God's Fetish ==
Eudoxis' second studio album, Evil God's Fetish was composed, engineered, recorded, mixed and mastered by Eudoxis. This full-length CD (also in digital format) was released in 2023 accompanied by the video for Lies which was directed by Mark Hill-Anderson. The album cover illustration is a painting by Mathieu Racicot. This CD was released under the band's independent Shell Shock label and was produced and distributed by Eudoxis.

== Members ==
Members included:

- Mars B. Alexander (guitars) – 1989–1993
- Mark Hill-Anderson (guitars) – 1985–1986 and 2020-2024
- Leiv Arnesen (vocals) – 1985–1987
- Mario Gilles (guitars)
- Sotiri Papafylis (vocals)
- J.P.Perrault (drums)
- Rick "Raz" Raczko (bass)
- Stephane Rioux (drums)- 1984–1990
- Ronnie Theriault (guitars) – 1986–1989
