= Schnitt Acht =

American EBM and industrial metal band

- Origin: Orlando, FL, USA
- Genres: EBM, industrial metal
- Years active: ca. 1989–1994
- Labels: Cheetah Records
- Spinoffs: Radioactive Goldfish; Rainbow Bridge; Gypsy Sun
- Past members: Morgan Lekcirt; Virgil L. Hibbs; Christopher Lee; Jeff E. Paymaster

Schnitt Acht was an American EBM and industrial metal band from Orlando, Florida, active in the first half of the 1990s. The band's name is German for "cut eight", initially a translation error of "Section 8", "Abschnitt Acht" in German.

== History ==
Formed in the late 1980s in Orlando, Florida by Morgan Lekcirt (born William Morgan Trickel), Virgil L. Hibbs, Abbot Zigler (born Christopher Lee) and later Jeff Paymaster, they signed in 1989 with DJ Magic Mike's Majii label that was part of the Cheetah Record Company. Following several 12-inch singles, Schnitt Acht (alternately spelled SCHNITT Acht!) released their first album Subhuman Minds in 1990. It was followed in 1993 by Slash and Burn. The second album took a musical turn from the industrial dance style of subhuman Minds towards a more guitar-driven industrial crossover sound. Between 1991 and 1994 the band did a lot of touring, even performing in Europe and making tours in Germany and Romania. After their last tour in 1994, the band split up.

Virgil later started his own band WIRETRIPN, with which he self-released in 2001 the album Midnight in the Robot Factory via online retailer IUMA.

Paymaster, with Morgan, and Jan Herkach the techno/rave trio Radioactive Goldfish with whom he released "LSD Is the Bomb" which hit #8 of the Billboard Dance/Club Play Songs on March 14, 1992. Later he kept releasing as - among others - Rainbow Bridge and Gypsy Sun, worked as a producer in Florida and run the label Rainbow Bridge Records out of Orlando.

== Discography ==
The discography consists of two studio albums and four twelve inches.

=== Subhuman Minds (1989/91) ===
Subhuman Minds On the Firing Line

Studio album by Schnitt Acht
- Released: 1990 (CD: 1991)
- Genre: EBM, electro-industrial
- Length: 57:19 (CD)
- Label: Cheetah; Hyperium (Germany)
- Producer: Morgan Lekcirt

Schnitt Acht chronology
Subhuman Minds; On the Firing Line (1990)	Slash and Burn (1993)

Professional ratings
Review scores
Source	Rating
Allmusic	link

Subhuman Minds (or with its subtitle Subhuman Minds on the Firing Line) was the band's first album, released on vinyl in 1990 by Cheetah's Majii label. It is electro-industrial and was licensed by Hyperium Records for a German release. For while, a CD release of the album was only available by the German label, but in 1991 Cheetah issued a Gold release for the North American market.

==== Track list ====
All songs are written and produced by Morgan Lekcirt.
Published by C.H.R. Publishing.

===== Vinyl =====
Side 1

1. Grouch
2. Killing All the Time (6:22)
3. He's Back
4. Sinking
5. He Bought the Farm
6. Forming

Side 2

7. Killing All the Time
8. Sub Human Mind
9. CIC
10. Dream World

===== Compact Disc =====
Act 1: The Fire of War

1. Subhuman Minds (3:46)
2. Killing All the Time (6:22)
3. Metal Storm (3:48)
4. C.I.C. (4:19)
5. Fire (4:58)
6. Sinking (4:01)
7. Forming (1:47)

Act 2: This is Not a Dream

8. He Bought the Farm (5:25)
9. Ice Grip (6:10)
10. Grouch (4:11)
11. Good Evening Fraülin (4:11)
12. Dream World (4:36)
13. Deforming (3:41)

==== Credits ====
- Morgan Lekcirt - vocals, programming, percussion sampling & keyboards
- Virgil L. Hibbs - guitar percussion, backing vocals
- Abbot Zigler. - drums keyboards & percussion
- Jeff E. - drums & percussion
- Thomas R. Reich - executive producer & manager
- Jan Hrkach - recording, engineering, mixing & additional production
- Bob Ingra - mixing, additional production
- Mike Fuller - mastering
- DJ Magic Mike - mastering input

==== Singles ====
- 1989 Subhuman Minds (12")
- 1990 Fire (12")
- 1991 Grouch (12")

=== Slash and Burn (1992/93) ===
Slash and Burn

Studio album by Schnitt Acht
- Released: 18 May 1993
- Genre: industrial metal, electro-industrial
- Length: 58:44
- Label: Cheetah; Hyperium (Germany)
- Producer: Morgan Lekcirt

Schnitt Acht chronology
Subhuman Minds (1991)	''Slash and Burn'' (1993)

Professional ratings
Review scores
Source	Rating
Allmusic	link

With their second album Slash and Burn, released in 1993, they slowly moved into a more metal-influenced style, while trying to retain much that made their first album work. Originally release on Cheetah's Majii label, it was licensed by Hyperium for Germany and by Devotion Records for the U.K.

==== Track list ====
All songs are written and produced by Morgan Lekcirt.
Published by C.H.R. Publishing.
Sides are indicated, even on the compact disc release.

Side A

1. Sweet Liberty (5:13)
2. Dead Connection (1:11)
3. The War Has Begun (4:16)
4. Radical Retraction (1:45)
5. Rage (4:52)
6. Crawl (2:31)
7. I Don't Think So (6:18)

Side B

8. Reforming (5:35)
9. Dialogue (5:03)
10. Random Funk (3:53)
11. Reality Tap (3:25)
12. Give Me Release (5:17)
13. Aftermath (5:35)
14. Overture (3:50)

==== Credits ====
- Morgan Lekcirt - vocals, programming, beats & keyboards, mixing
- Virgil L. Hibbs - guitars, programming, backing vocals
- Abbot Zigler. - drums & percussion
- Thomas R. Reich - executive producer & manager

==== Single ====
- 1992 Rage / Random Funk (CD / 12")
