= 1000 Mona Lisas =

American punk band

1000 Mona Lisas were an American punk band from Hollywood, California, United States, formed in 1992. They found minor success in 1995 with their cover of Alanis Morissette's "You Oughta Know". It first became popular when they performed it live at The Whisky A Go Go, after which, almost as an afterthought, the band decided to include it on their debut EP as a hidden track after much cajoling by their A&R guy Brian Malouf. Before signing with RCA Records, the band became popular performing throughout Southern California often, also through extensive DIY touring of the west coast and posting songs and ticket giveaways on the internet, which was an unusual practice at the time. They released a full-length album on RCA on February 27, 1996, titled New Disease produced by Geza X which was the first major label release to be offered via the internet before its street date release through a site called IUMA (Internet Underground Music Archive). The band members were Armando Prado (guitar, vocals) Gianni Neiviller (bass, vocals) Rocco Bidlovski (drums, vocals).
