= Bass Computer =

Studio album by Techmaster P.E.B.
- Released: September 1, 1991
- Recorded: 1990–91
- Studio: Miditek Studios (Sarasota, FL)
- Genre: Miami Bass
- Length: 1:01:20
- Label: Newtown Records
- Producer: Techmaster P.E.B.

Techmaster P.E.B. chronology
It Came From Outer Bass (1990)	Bass Computer (1991)	It Came From Outer Bass II (1993)

Professional ratings
Review scores
Source	Rating
AllMusic	2/5 stars

Bass Computer is the second studio album by American Miami bass artist Techmaster P.E.B. It was released on September 1, 1991, through Newtown Records. Recording sessions took place at Midtek Studios in Sarasota, Florida. The album reached number one on the Billboard Heatseekers chart on April 25, 1992, also reaching number 132 on the Billboard 200 on June 13, 1992.

== Track listing ==
All tracks are written by Techmaster P.E.B.

No.	Title	Length
1.	"Activate"	0:41
2.	"Time to Jam"	3:32
3.	"Bass by Numbers"	3:45
4.	"Scratchin' Megabass Mix"	4:14
5.	"D.P.E."	4:55
6.	"Computer Love" (Slow Bass)	4:49
7.	"Bass Computer"	3:18
8.	"P.E.B. 500"	3:30
9.	"Don't Stop the Music"	1:49
10.	"Techno Bass Beats"	3:49
11.	"Power Bass Ultra Mix"	3:18
12.	"Bassgasm" (Ultimate Woofer Test)	3:41
13.	"Bad Bass Mix"	5:05
14.	"Euromusik"	3:35
15.	"I Like the Boom"	4:03
16.	"Outerbass Mix"	5:17
17.	"Tech'in Slow n' Low" (bonus track on CD)	2:25
Total length:		1:01:20
