= The Uninvited (band) =

The Uninvited is a band originally from Los Angeles in the United States. The band was named, formed and founded in 1988 when brothers John and Steve Taylor teamed up with longtime friend Bill Cory on bass and James "Trainwreck" Robinson on drums. The band then went on to play Hollywood's legendary local concert venues as they developed their signature sound and style. For the next three years, the band built a strong local following and major music industry buzz as well as critical acclaim in the Los Angeles music press.

However, The Uninvited did not really take off until 1991, when Robinson departed and drummer Bruce Logan was added to the lineup. The band went on to record and release three CDs on their independent Roarshack Records label, and subsequently won MTV's Beach House Band contest. Armed with their independent CD Artificial Hip and a brand new Ford Econoline van, the foursome set out to tour and never come back. The Uninvited left their hometown of Los Angeles and eventually settled in San Francisco. In the next two years, they played almost 500 shows.

All this activity caught the attention of Atlantic Records, which released the band's self-titled major label debut in 1998. The album yielded two alternative radio hits, "What God Said" and "Too High For The Supermarket," while other songs became featured on TV shows like Party of Five, Beverly Hills 90210, and MTV's Road Rules and The Real World. The Uninvited kept up the touring pace, opening for acts like Cheap Trick, Violent Femmes, Fuel, Candlebox, Third Eye Blind, and Blues Traveler.

In 1999, The Uninvited parted ways with Atlantic and sought greater opportunities on the internet. In October of that year, the band released It’s All Good on their own label, Half-Baked Records. Shortly afterward, original bassist Bill Cory was replaced by Frederick "Ladd" Story, formerly of Los Angeles prog-rock kings Urban Circus. Still booked by Monterey Peninsula Artists, the band kept up its relentless touring schedule, averaging 50,000 miles a year on the road. Sales of The Uninvited's indie albums shot up past 40,000 copies, with 13 Ways to Feel the Love spending nine weeks on top of the Mp3.com Sales Chart.

In December 2001, the band completed its sixth full-length album, Malltopia, which was produced, engineered and mixed by the Taylor Brothers in their new studio. A bit of a departure for the band, Malltopia is a concept album of sorts with a storyline that centers on suburban kids at the mall. In 2002, the band released their Teenage Dance Party album on Roarshack Records, a collection of rarities that sold well despite the fact that CDs were becoming less popular than downloadable files. In late 2002 the band went on an extended hiatus, returning two years later under a new name, Fish Ranch Road.

In 2019 the Taylor brothers reformed the group with drummer John Messier. Soon after Mac Akin and Arman Sedgwick-Billimoria were added to the official lineup. They continue to tour and record. Guitarist Steven Taylor wrote a memoir of the band's experiences titled The Uninvited – On the Road with the Greatest Rock Band You Never Heard, which was picked up by Hurn Publications for release in late 2021.

== Albums ==
Title	Release	Label	
Pop This	1992	Half-Baked	rereleased on Roarshack
Too High	1994	Half-Baked	rereleased on Roarshack
Artificial Hip	23 July 1996	Roarshack	
Uninvited	1998	Atlantic	
It's All Good	1999	Roarshack	
Malltopia	2001	Roarshack	
Teenage Dance Party	2002	Roarshack	
Broken Promiseland	2023	Roarshack	

== Other releases ==
Title	Release	Label	
Share The Brain	1991	Roarshack	fan club cassette with James "Big Gulp" Robinson, original drummer.
Successful Vegetarian	1994	Half Baked	7 inch record
Christmas on Death Row	1996	Roarshack	fan club cassette
13 Ways to Feel the Love	2000	MP3.com	released online as an MP3 album
While You Were Waiting	2001	MP3.com	released online as MP3 demos for the Malltopia album
Teenage Dance Party	2002	Roarshack	a collection of B-Sides and rarities
Broken Promiseland	2023		
