= Bong Spirit Vodka =

Vodka brand

- Type: Vodka
- Manufacturer: Bong Spirit Imports, LLC
- Distributor: Southern Glazer’s Wine and Spirits Brescome and Barton (USA)
- Origin: Netherlands
- Introduced: 2005
- Alcohol by volume: 40%
- Proof (US): 80
- Colour: Clear
- Website: www.bongspirit.com

Bong Spirit Vodka is a vodka brand, sold in a bottle shaped like a bong. It is made from European grain, distilled six times and filtered through four processes, using reverse osmosis and charcoal filtering. It is distributed in the United States by Southern Glazer's Wine and Spirits, and Republic National.

== History ==
Bong Spirit Imports was founded by a group of partners in Orlando, Florida. In 2005, artist Jimi Beach developed the concept for the Bong Spirit brand and served as the company's marketing director. The New York Times stated, "it is certainly a well-designed marketing strategy that not only redefines the spirit world, but also the art community". Beach chose the controversial bottle design based on its symbolism as a communal object, and the cultural role it has represented for decades as an underground icon in the arts and entertainment community.

In 2006, the company launched the Spirit of the Brand program, which was based on a collector series of bottles featuring the art of several up-and-coming artists. The art bottles are distributed randomly in cases of both 750 mL and 1 L bottle sizes.

In 2010 and 2011, Beach's bottle design won the Platinum Prize, "Best of Class" award at the Spirits International Prestige (SIP) Awards in San Diego, California.

== International awards and recognition ==
Bong Spirit Vodka has received top industry awards for taste and design including two Gold Awards from the London-based International Wine and Spirit Competition (2009, 2013), a Gold Award from the Beverage Testing Institute with a score of 91 points, which described it "intriguing and elegant", a Gold Award at the 2010 SIP Awards International Spirits Competition in San Diego, and a Silver Award from the San Francisco World Spirits Championships in San Francisco

In 2011, Bong Spirit Vodka was awarded the Silver Award at the IWSC competition in the United Kingdom. Judging for this high end, global competition is achieved through a rigorous two stage judging process of professional blind tasting and detailed (chemical and microbiological) analysis.

In addition to awards for taste, the company has won numerous acknowledgments for design including two Silver Awards at the 2013 World Spirits Competition in San Francisco for Best Package Design, and First Place at the 22nd Annual Beverage Dynamics Advertising and Promotion Awards naming the Bong Spirit Lava Lamp as "2007's Best Promotional Display".

== Acquisition ==
On September 22, 2010, Bong Spirit Imports, LLC was acquired by Millennium Prime, Inc., and operates as a subsidiary of the company.
