= Animal Bag =

- Origin: Charlotte, North Carolina, United States
- Genres: Alternative metal, grunge
- Years active: 1987–1998
- Labels: Mercury Records
- Members: Luke Edwards; Rich Parris (deceased); Otis Hughes; Boo Duckworth (deceased)

Animal Bag was an alternative metal grunge band from Charlotte, North Carolina, United States, which was active from 1987 through 1998.

== Career ==
After some personnel changes, the band formed around members Luke Edwards (vocals and guitar), Rich Parris (guitars, mandolin, and vocals), Otis Hughes (bass guitar), and Boo Duckworth (drums and percussion) in 1987. After building a following in their native North Carolina, the group relocated to Los Angeles in 1989.

Favorable press in newspapers, including the L.A. Music Scene, which compared them to the Red Hot Chili Peppers and Faith No More, helped raise the band's profile. Coupled with the exploding alternative music scene, the exposure attracted the attention of several A&R execs. Eventually, Animal Bag signed with Mercury Records in 1992.

Their 1992 self-titled initial release blended acoustic and electric rock. That same year, Animal Bag was prominently featured in the pilot episode of My So-Called Life as the party band. The album's first single, Everybody, peaked briefly at No. 29 on the Billboard Mainstream Rock chart in 1993. Additionally, it was a minor success in Japan, hitting No. 32 for 8 weeks in March 1993. Their follow-up 1994 album, Offering, was all-acoustic and did not chart well in the U.S. Mercury was willing to give the band one more chance, bringing in producer Terry Date to oversee a return to harder-edged music for the 1996 album Image Damage. The album was never released because of inner shakeups at the record label; most of the people who had worked the first two Animal Bag releases left the label.

== Discography ==
Albums/EPs

- Animal Bag LP (1992)
- Offering EP (1994)
- Image Damage LP (1995) (Never officially released)
- Misc Recordings EP (1998)

Singles

Year	Song	US Rock	Album
1992	"Hate Street"	—	Animal Bag
1992	"Everybody"	29	Animal Bag
1993	"Hello Cosmo"	—	Animal Bag
1993	"Darker Days"	—	Animal Bag
1994	"Stupidity: For Art's Sake"	—	Image Damage
