= Concrete Marketing =

American marketing company

- Industry: Marketing
- Founded: 1984
- Founders: Bob Chiappardi, Walter O'Brien
- Website: concreteplanet.com

Concrete Marketing is an independent marketing company based in New York City, US, founded by Bob Chiappardi and Walter O'Brien in 1984.

== Concrete: Early years ==
Concrete Marketing was founded by Bob Chiappardi and Walter O'Brien in 1984. Chiappardi was working in the mail room of Arista Records in New York whilst managing a few bands from Long Island and O'Brien was the founder of Relativity/Combat Records. The company name was chosen by plucking a name blindly from the Yellow Pages. Concrete's first client was RCA's Grim Reaper. It was during the group's first tour that Chiappardi and O'Brien decided to start working as a marketing company, realizing that there were few people out there to properly service the metal community.

During the 1984 New Music Seminar, they distributed around 200 flyers advertising Concrete and its services and by the end of the first day they had been approached by Rick Dobbis, then vice president of marketing at Chrysalis Records, and were hired to work the first full-length Armoured Saint record.

In 1990, Chiappardi and O’Brien amicably split as business partners with Chiappardi taking the helm of Concrete Marketing and several other companies they had created, whilst Walter O’Brien took Concrete Management, the management company that looked after Pantera, White Zombie and Prong.

== Concrete Corner ==
In 1992, the company began Concrete Corner, the purpose of which was the promotion and distribution of heavy metal records. This was achieved at a retail level by creating a unified sales force from the blending of independent and select chain stores that would adopt the program thus promoting select hard rock/metal/hardcore/alternative releases.

The format of the program was a store within a store concept and featured point of purchase displays, instore play, sales pricing, clerk recommendations and 15,000 monthly sampler CDs. A free hard music magazine Concrete Corner was available for the consumer, while ‘Network Newz’ provided information for the store owner. Key reasoning behind these strategies was that small retailers fared better with niche markets such as heavy metal.

Occasionally for selected record launches, listening parties and midnight sales would be held the day before the release of the album proper. The first listening party and midnight sale, in which 318 of the 325 stores participated, was for a Metallica boxset.

Listening parties would be advertised through instore banners, syndicated radio shows, and in magazines that featured the SoundScan hard music chart, owned by Concrete. Invitations would go out to Concrete's 20,000 strong database of fans and stores would invite their targeted customers by mail.

The program was successful in offering more to the consumer who received freebies, discounts and won raffle prizes; to the store whose staff won prizes for the best display and to the label which could be certain that their product was being pushed to their target audience.

Other promotions that spun off Concrete Corner were "bonus disc" giveaways, where a bonus disc of artists from different labels was shrink wrapped to a highly anticipated new release from one of Concrete's clients. The first of these types of promotions was for Korn’s album Follow the Leader in which 100,000 copies of a compilation CD featuring tracks of breakthrough artists approved by Korn, as well as a previously unreleased Korn track were given away to each person who purchased the record. Baby band artists, at the time, featured on the first disc included Kid Rock, Powerman 5000, Orgy and Limp Bizkit. Subsequent programs like this were executed for Megadeth and Rob Zombie, among others.

In 1994, a Concrete Corner Tour was also put together. The concept of the tour was to initiate monthly events in each city where the tour was routed, with the focus of the shows being more on creating an affordable, fun evening of music rather than being based specifically on recognition of the bands' names. This club tour allowed for the exposure of the bands to ticketholders who may not have seen them otherwise. Shows featured raffles and giveaways, and the first in the tour series saw Greta, Varga and Shootyz Groove take to the road.

In 1998, Concrete Corner and Concrete Marketing won the ‘Related Products and Services Supplier of the Year’ award from National Association of Recording Merchandisers (NARM), the trade organization of music retail industry. This was the first time this award was ever presented. In subsequent years, Concrete was nominated two more times.

== RetailVision ==
RetailVision was a service Concrete provided which was based upon in-store video play. Concrete kept a database of 1200 stores nationwide, organized by genre in order to provide appropriate video reel compilations to each in the four genres of alternative (AlternateVision), rap (RapVision), hard rock (MetalVision) and pop music (HitVision). The appropriate video cassette was distributed to each of the stores which allowed the active consumer to see all the new hits, while at the same time let new bands reach a wider audience because of the ever-expanding record store network. With this program, Concrete could help promote 30 - 40 new bands/songs a month. Bands were selected for RetailVision via a regular weekly meeting of heavy metal fans who could vote for their favorite entries, thus helping the program maintain credibility and quality.

== Foundations and the Hard Music Soundscan Chart ==
Before producing Foundations, the first exclusively heavy metal trade publication, Concrete were contributing to Friday Morning Quarterback (FMQB). By the time they had worked the first Metallica record and the second Anthrax record and were beginning to amass a lot of metal clients, they decided it was time to begin their own newsletter, and so the first issue of Foundations was distributed in January 1988.

It was a bi-weekly publication that provided release information, tour itineraries and a breakdown of all of Concrete's current projects, the idea behind it being that it should mimic the underground fanzines that were rife within the scene. It also featured the Concrete/Soundscan Hard Music chart. This chart was also syndicated not only in US regional publications such as Radioactive, Good Times and The Aquarian, but also in worldwide publications like Entertainment Weekly, Metal Hammer and Guitar World, reaching a combined readership of somewhere in the region of three million.
