= Cringe (album) =

1995 compilation album by The Clay People

Compilation album by Clay People
- Released: 1995
- Recorded: 1993 – 1995
- Studio: Track in the Box (Baltimore, MD)
- Genre: Industrial metal, alternative metal
- Length: 64:10
- Label: Out of Line

Clay People chronology
The Iron Icon (1995)	Cringe (1995)	Strange Day (1996)

Cringe is a compilation album by The Clay People, released in 1995 by record label Out of Line. It compiles most of the band's second album The Iron Icon with remixes and two tracks from the debut.

== Track listing ==
All tracks are written by Clay People, except "Paranoid" by Geezer Butler, Tony Iommi, Ozzy Osbourne and Bill Ward.

No.	Title	From album (date)	Length
1.	"Pariah" (Uncensored)		4:30
2.	"Palegod"	The Iron Icon (1995)	4:08
3.	"Nothing"	Firetribe (1993)	3:54
4.	"Lethargic"	The Iron Icon (1995)	3:57
5.	"We Are All Sick"	The Iron Icon (1995)	4:22
6.	"Deadman" (Robin Graves Mix)		4:28
7.	"Rusted Iron Turning Wheel"	The Iron Icon (1995)	5:41
8.	"Spit" (Edit)	The Iron Icon (1995)	3:34
9.	"Victims"	The Iron Icon (1995)	3:48
10.	"Paranoid" (Black Sabbath cover)	Shut Up Kitty (1993)	3:38
11.	"Lethargic" (Moonday Remix)		3:53
12.	"We Are All Sick" (Criminal Remix)		5:52
13.	"Pariah" (Plow Encroach Mix)		4:58
14.	"Shroud"	Firetribe (1993)	3:42
15.	"Pariah" (Clean Radio Edit)		3:45

== Personnel ==
Adapted from the Cringe liner notes.

Clay People

- Kevin Bakerian – drums
- Alex Eller – keyboards, programming, production
- Daniel Neet – lead vocals
- Karla Williams – electric guitar

Additional musicians

- Duane Beer – loops, sampler
- Burton C. Bell – backing vocals (4, 5, 8, 12)
- Alex Welz – backing vocals (7)

Production and design

- Chase – art direction
- Van Christie – production, recording and mixing (4, 5, 7–9)
- James Galas – illustrations
- Jason McNinch – production, recording and mixing (4, 5, 7–9)
- Jeff Motch – design
- Mud – mastering
- Adam Yoffe – production, recording and mixing (4, 5, 7–9)

== Release history ==
Region	Date	Label	Format	Catalog
United States	1995	Out of Line	CD	OUT 002
