= Named =

Named may refer to something that has been given a name.

Named may also refer to:

- named (computing), a widely used DNS server
- Naming (parliamentary procedure)
- The Named (band), an American industrial metal group

In literature:

- The Named, a fantasy novel by Marianne Curley
- The Named, a fictional race of prehistoric big cats, depicted in The Books of the Named series by Clare Bell

== See also ==
- Name (disambiguation)
- Names (disambiguation)
- Naming (disambiguation)
