= Ditch the Attitude, Pally =

Studio album by Iron Lung Corp
- Released: November 12, 2002
- Studio: Cracknation (Chicago, IL)
- Genre: Electro-industrial
- Length: 60:35
- Label: Underground, Inc.
- Producer: Jamie Duffy; Jason Novak

Iron Lung Corp chronology
Big Shiny Spears (1997)	Ditch the Attitude, Pally (2002)	Body Snatchers (2013)

Ditch the Attitude, Pally is the second studio album of Iron Lung Corp, released in November 12, 2002 by Underground, Inc.

== Track listing ==
All tracks are written by Jamie Duffy and Daniel Neet, except where noted.

No.	Title	Writer(s)	Length
1.	"How We Rock It"	Jason Novak	4:57
2.	"Soulsteppa"	Daniel Neet	4:33
3.	"Canine Strap"	Jason Novak	3:47
4.	"I'm a Superstar"	Jason Novak	3:43
5.	"Amputee Non Gratis"		6:12
6.	"Digital Genius"		1:50
7.	"One in the Clip"	Jason Novak	3:42
8.	"Cool Life"	Daniel Neet	3:30
9.	"Rock Star Camp"	Jason Novak	4:58
10.	"Piehole"	Jason Novak	3:39
11.	"I'm Losing Me"	Daniel Neet	6:30
12.	"Liquid in the Lungs"		3:23
13.	"Nutpuncher"	Daniel Neet	6:42
14.	"Metal"		3:09

== Accolades ==
Year	Publication	Country	Accolade	Rank
2002	CMJ New Music Monthly	United States	"Dance"	135
"*" denotes an unordered list.

== Personnel ==
Adapted from the Ditch the Attitude, Pally liner notes.

Iron Lung Corp

- Dan Brill – drums
- Dan Dinsmore – drums
- Jamie Duffy – guitar, electronics, production, recording, mixing, mastering
- Eliot Engelman – bass guitar
- Gregory A. Lopez – bass guitar
- Daniel Neet – vocals
- Ethan Novak – drums
- Jason Novak – electronics, guitar, vocals, editing, production, recording, mixing, mastering

Additional musicians

- F.J. DeSanto (as FJ Lincoln) – additional synthesizer
- Jeff Mrozek – musical assistance (1)
- Giorgia Novak – vocals (5)
- Sarah Orloff – vocals (4)
- Paris – guitar (2)

Production and design

- Contemporary Design – design
- Rick Furr – photography

== Release history ==
Region	Date	Label	Format	Catalog
2002	United States	Underground, Inc.	CD	UIN1047
