= Body Snatchers (Iron Lung Corp album) =

Studio album of cover songs by Iron Lung Corp
- Released: September 2013
- Studio: Cracknation (Chicago, IL)
- Genre: Electro-industrial
- Length: 49:50
- Label: Cracknation
- Producer: Iron Lung Corp

Iron Lung Corp chronology
| Ditch the Attitude, Pally (2002) | Body Snatchers (2013) |

Body Snatchers is a cover album by Iron Lung Corp, released in September 2013 by Cracknation Records.

== Track listing ==
| No. | Title | Writer(s) | Length |
|---|---|---|---|
| 1. | "Intruder" (Peter Gabriel cover) | Peter Gabriel | 5:04 |
| 2. | "Edge of No Control Pt. Two" (Meat Beat Manifesto cover) | Jack Dangers | 3:57 |
| 3. | "The Blood" (The Cure cover) | Robert Smith | 4:06 |
| 4. | "Don't Crash" (Front 242 cover) | Valery Steele, Daniel B. | 4:43 |
| 5. | "Europa and the Pirate Twins" (Thomas Dolby cover) | Thomas Dolby | 3:30 |
| 6. | "Nemesis" (Shriekback cover) | Dave Allen, Barry Andrews, Martyn Barker, Carl Marsh | 4:03 |
| 7. | "Love on a Real Train" (Tangerine Dream cover) | Edgar Froese, Christopher Franke, Johannes Schmoelling | 2:34 |
| 8. | "Black Widow" (Alice Cooper cover) | Alice Cooper, Bob Ezrin, Kelley Jay | 3:52 |
| 9. | "A Question of Time" (Depeche Mode cover) | Martin Gore | 4:03 |
| 10. | "Promises" (Naked Eyes cover) | Pete Byrne, Rob Fisher | 3:31 |
| 11. | "Eighties" (Killing Joke cover) | Jaz Coleman, Paul Ferguson, Paul Raven, Kevin Walker | 5:10 |
| 12. | "Run Like Hell" (Pink Floyd cover) | David Gilmour, Roger Waters | 5:27 |

== Personnel ==
Adapted from the Body Snatchers liner notes.

Iron Lung Corp

- Wade Alin – programming (8)
- Dan Brill – drums (6, 11)
- Dan Dinsmore – drums (1, 8, 12)
- Eliot Engelman – bass guitar (8, 11, 12)
- Brian Elza – guitar (3, 6)
- Brian McGarvey – guitar (1, 8, 12)
- Gregory A. Lopez – bass guitar (3, 4, 6)
- Daniel Neet – guitar (1), vocals (8), cover art
- Jason Novak – programming (1, 3, 4, 5, 6, 8, 9, 10, 11), vocals (1, 3, 5, 6, 9, 11), guitar (2, 4, 6, 9), bass guitar (5)
- Ethan Novak – guitar (5, 7, 9, 11, 12), drums (1, 3), vocals (5),
- Sean Payne – programming (1, 2, 12)
- Eric Powell – vocals (4, 6), guitar (4), programming (4)
- Steven Seibold – programming (5, 6, 10), guitar (10), vocals (10), bass guitar (10)

Additional musicians

- Kelly Britton – guest vocals (3)

== Release history ==
| Region | Date | Label | Format | Catalog |
|---|---|---|---|---|
| 2013 | United States | Cracknation | CD | |
