= Fifth Column (disambiguation) =

A fifth column is a group of people who undermine a larger group from within.

Fifth Column may also refer to:

== Literature ==
- The Fifth Column, a 1938 play by Ernest Hemingway, published in the volume The Fifth Column and the First Forty-Nine Stories
- Fifth Column, a 1940 book by John Langdon-Davies

== Film and television ==
- The Fifth Column (film) (also known as Hinkerort zorasune), a 2010 short film set in Beirut
- "The Fifth Column", episode 2.35 of the military science fiction series Exosquad
- "The Fifth Column", a group of alien dissidents in the V science fiction franchise, first shown in the original miniseries.
- Die fünfte Kolonne (The Fifth Column), a German television series

== Music ==
- Fifth Column (band), an all-women post-punk band from Toronto, Canada
- The 5ifth Column, an album by industrial rock band Acumen Nation
- Fifth Column, a 2003 album by British musician U.N.P.O.C.
- The 5th Column, official street team of the rock band AFI
- Fifth Column Records, an industrial record label active in the 1990s

== Others ==
- Fifth Column (intelligence operation), a Second World War deception operation by MI5
- The Fifth Column, a political and media gossip page in Ireland's Sunday Independent
- Fifth Column (sotūn-e panjom), an editorial in the Iranian newspaper Jame'e written by Ebrahim Nabavi
- The 5th Column, a fictional Nazi group in the City of Heroes MMORPG computer game
- The Fifth Column Podcast, a libertarian-leaning podcast hosted by Kmele Foster, Michael C. Moynihan, Matt Welch.

== See also ==
- Sixth Column, a 1941 science fiction novel by Robert A. Heinlein
