= Unkind =

Unkind may refer to:

- Unkind, an EP by Acumen Nation, 1997
- "Unkind" (song), by Sloan, 2011
- "Unkind", a song by Acumen Nation from More Human Heart, 1997
- "Unkind", a song by Hurt from Vol. 1, 2006
- "Unkind", a song by the Mighty Lemon Drops from Sound ... Goodbye to Your Standards, 1991
- "An Unkind", a song by Soundgarden from Down on the Upside, 1996
