= Transmissions from Eville =

Debut album by Acumen Nation

Studio album by Acumen Nation
- Released: 1994
- Genre: Industrial rock
- Length: 47:39(Original release); 59:21 (Fifth Colvmn re-release); 74:56 (Conscience re-release)
- Label: Robot Records
- Producer: Keith "Fluffy" Auerbach and Acumen Nation

Acumen Nation chronology
Transmissions from Eville (1994)	Territory=Universe (1996)

Transmissions from Eville is the debut studio album by the American industrial rock band Acumen Nation. The album was initially recorded to an 8-track tape and was released as a demo under the name Acumen on Robot Records in 1994. Later, the band was signed to Fifth Colvmn Records, and the album was re-recorded with production from Keith Auerbach and was released on February 14, 1995. The album was then re-released again by Conscience Records on May 12, 1998.

== Track listing ==
=== Original Robot Records release ===
1. "Matador" – 6:04
2. "Eville" – 5:03
3. "Frozen Shallow" – 4:40
4. "The Worms" – 3:50
5. "Father in the Wall" – 4:56
6. "Noarmsnolegs" – 5:15
7. "Sutures" – 8:33
8. "Gun Lover '94" / "Ultraviolent" – 9:18

"Ultraviolent" is not shown on the CD track listing. "Frozen Shallow" later appears on the Iron Lung Corp album Big Shiny Spears.

=== 1995 re-release ===
1. "Initialize Transmission/Matador" – 6:24
2. "Eville" – 5:19
3. "Gun Lover" – 4:13
4. "The Words" – 3:48
5. "F.W.M." – 4:39
6. "Father in the Wall" – 4:57
7. "Noarmsnolegs" – 5:14
8. "Anchorite" – 3:25
9. "Chameleon Skin" – 9:22
10. "Sutures" – 8:28
11. "Finalize Transmission" – 3:32

=== 1998 re-release bonus tracks ===
1. "Matador (Remix)" – 6:17
2. "Gun Lover (Remix)" – 4:48
3. "Ultraviolent" – 4:30

All songs written and arranged by Jason Novak, except tracks 4 & 6, music co-written by Ethan Novak.

== Personnel ==
- Jason Novak – vocals, programming, backing guitars,
- Gregory A. Lopez – bass guitar, live drums on tracks 4 & 5
- Ethan Novak – guitars, live drums on tracks 2, 3, 8, 9, & 10
- Jamie "Kid" Duffy – guitars, "tech support" (Only on 1995 and 1998 releases)
