= Demon Hero and Other Extraordinary Phantasmagoric Anomalies & Fables =

2018 studio album by The Clay People

Studio album by The Clay People
- Released: September 28, 2018
- Studio: Overit Studios (Albany, NY)
- Genre: Industrial rock
- Length: 42:29
- Label: Magnetic Eye
- Producer: Brian McGarvey

The Clay People chronology
Waking the Dead (2007)	Demon Hero and Other Extraordinary Phantasmagoric Anomalies & Fables (2018)

Demon Hero and Other Extraordinary Phantasmagoric Anomalies & Fables is the fifth studio album by The Clay People, released on September 28, 2018 by Magnetic Eye Records. It contains reworked re-recordings of the previously released songs "Palegod" from The Iron Icon and "Strange Day" from Stone-Ten Stitches.

== Reception ==
ReGen gave the album a positive review, calling it a "celebration of the band's past" and "a solidified merging of alt. metal and coldwave along with more refined songwriting that is sure to please longtime fans as well as attract some new crowds."

== Track listing ==
All tracks are written by Dan Dinsmore, Brian McGarvey and Daniel Neet.

Side one
No.	Title	Length
1.	"Utopian Lie"	4:10
2.	"Bloodletter"	3:23
3.	"Now"	3:18
4.	"My Own Worst Enemy"	3:36
5.	"GenRx"	3:48
6.	"Illuminatus"	3:51

Side two
No.	Title	Length
1.	"Hex Machine"	3:40
2.	"Strange Day"	4:12
3.	"Palegod"	3:41
4.	"Colossus"	3:50
5.	"Firestarter"	5:01

== Personnel ==
Adapted from the Demon Hero and Other Extraordinary Phantasmagoric Anomalies & Fables liner notes.

Clay People

- Dan Dinsmore – drums, producer, executive-producer
- Brian McGarvey – vocals, production
- Daniel Neet – lead vocals, synthesizer, production

Production and design

- Alan Douches – mastering
- Scoops Dardaris – associate producer
- Neil Kernon – mixing

== Release history ==
Region	Date	Label	Format	Catalog
United States	2018	Magnetic Eye	DL, LP	MER063
