= Sean Payne =

Sean Payne may refer to:

- Cyanotic (band), member
- The Zutons, band member
