= Vanishing Kids =

American rock band

- Origin: Madison, Wisconsin, United States
- Genres: Doom metal, psychedelic rock, shoegaze, post-punk
- Years active: 2000–present
- Labels: Underground, Inc., Bright as Night, Svart, Aural Music
- Members: Nikki Drohomyreky; Jason Hartman; Jerry Sofran
- Website: vanishingkids.bandcamp.com

Vanishing Kids is an American rock band formed in Madison, Wisconsin, in 2000 by vocalist and keyboardist Nikki Drohomyreky and guitarist Jason Hartman. The group has moved between Madison and Portland, Oregon, and its music has combined post-punk, shoegaze, psychedelic rock, and doom metal. Bassist Jerry Sofran joined in 2013 and became part of the band's core lineup.

The band has released six studio albums, most recently Miracle of Death (2023), released by Aural Music.

== History ==
=== Formation and Portland years ===
Drohomyreky and Hartman formed Vanishing Kids in Madison in 2000. After relocating to the West Coast several times, the group settled in Portland and released its debut album, Rest the Glove That Wears You Down, in 2003. The Portland Mercury placed Vanishing Kids within the city's goth and post-punk scene and praised the album's guitar writing. The group followed it with the Invisible Home EP in 2004 and The Selfish Mirror in 2005. Martin Atkins worked on The Selfish Mirror, and Pitchfork described the record as drawing on 1980s new wave, shoegaze, and noise rock. A third album, Skies in Your Eyes, appeared in 2007.

After issuing a split single in 2009, Vanishing Kids stopped releasing music and performing. Drohomyreky and Hartman moved back to the Madison area in 2010. Sessions for the band's fourth album had begun in Portland in 2007 and continued through 2010; the record was mastered in 2012 and released as Spirit Visions in 2013 after a crowdfunding campaign. Vanishing Kids returned to the stage that fall.

=== Later albums ===
Sofran joined on bass in 2013, and drummer Hart Allan Miller joined soon afterward. By 2016 the quartet was writing collaboratively and had released the four-song EP Untitled. Their fifth album, Heavy Dreamer, was released by Svart Records in November 2018, their first full-length record in five years. Isthmus reported that the songs had been written over several years, mostly by Drohomyreky, and that the lineup with Miller and Sofran had been together for five years.

Vanishing Kids recorded Miracle of Death with Nick Johnson on drums and released it through Aural Music in October 2023. The album was produced by the band with Dustin Sisson and mixed by Randall Dunn. The group promoted the record with two United States tours, then announced a break from local performances after an August 2024 show while its core trio shifted to writing and tried out drummers. Vanishing Kids was listed on a Madison concert bill in May 2026.

== Musical style ==
Coverage of the band's early work emphasized goth, post-punk, new wave, shoegaze, and noise rock. In 2016, Tone Madison described the group's music as mixing post-punk, metal, progressive rock, and psychedelic rock, while noting that its newer material was slower and more influenced by doom metal. Reviews of Heavy Dreamer and Miracle of Death likewise identified elements of psychedelic rock, shoegaze, 1970s heavy rock, and doom metal. Decibel has called the band a doomgaze group.

== Discography ==
=== Studio albums ===
- Rest the Glove That Wears You Down (2003)
- The Selfish Mirror (2005)
- Skies in Your Eyes (2007)
- Spirit Visions (2013)
- Heavy Dreamer (2018)
- Miracle of Death (2023)

=== Extended plays ===
- Invisible Home (2004)
- Untitled (2016)
