= The Named (band) =

Industrial metal project

- Origin: Seattle, Washington, USA
- Genres: Digital hardcore, industrial metal
- Years active: 2009–present
- Labels: Glitch Mode Recordings, D-Trash
- Members: J.P. Anderson

The Named is an industrial metal project led by Rabbit Junk frontman JP Anderson, formed in 2009.

== History ==
Originally intended as a revival of turn-of-the-century digital hardcore group The Shizit, Anderson was forced to change the name of the project after legal threats from former The Shizit bandmate Brian Shrader. The Named released their self-titled album (originally released as The Shizit) in 2009 under D-Trash. In 2015, after 6 years of inactivity, Glitch Mode Recordings re-mastered and re-issued The Named with a brand new track, titled "Discipline", and a slightly altered track order.

== Discography ==
Albums

- The Named (2009, reissued 2015)

Singles

- "Fuck the Noise" (2009)
- "Discipline" (2015)
