= Strange Day (EP) =

1996 EP by The Clay People

EP by Clay People
- Released: 1996
- Recorded: 1995–1996
- Studio: Track in the Box (Baltimore, MD)
- Genre: Industrial rock
- Length: 46:03
- Label: Re-Constriction

Clay People chronology
Cringe (1995)	Strange Day (1996)	Stone-Ten Stitches (1997)

Strange Day is an EP by Clay People, released in 1996 by Re-Constriction Records.

== Track listing ==
All tracks are written by Daniel Neet, except where noted.

No.	Title	Writer(s)	Remixer(s)	Length
1.	"Strange Day" (Radio Version)			4:14
2.	"Pariah"			3:13
3.	"Pariah" (Flagrant Remix)		Wade Alin	4:15
4.	"Pariah" (Plow Encroach Remix)		Swamp Terrorists	4:58
5.	"Strange Day" (Blue in Black Remix)		George Hagegeorge	9:21
6.	"We Are All Sick" (Criminal Remix)	Kevin Bakerian, Alex Eller, Daniel Neet, Karla Williams	Joseph Bishara	5:51
7.	"Pariah" (Brain Clever Remix)		Swamp Terrorists	5:54
8.	"Jump Around" (House of Pain cover)	Larry Muggerud, Erik Schrody		3:49
9.	"Pariah" (Early Radio Version)			4:29

== Personnel ==
Adapted from the Strange Day liner notes.

Clay People

- Brian McGarvey – electric guitar, bass guitar, programming
- Daniel Neet – lead vocals, programming

Additional musicians

- Wade Alin – additional programming (8)
- Jared Cummings – guest vocals (8)
- Alex Eller – additional instrumentation (9)
- John Partridge – saxophone (5)

Production and design

- DJ Killroy – additional production (7)
- George Hagegeorge – production (1, 2, 5)
- STR – additional production (4)
- D. Patrick Walsh – art direction, design
- Brady McTague – art direction, design

== Release history ==
Region	Date	Label	Format	Catalog
United States	1996	Re-Constriction	CD	CS REC-026
