= Mutants of Sound =

Studio album by DJ? Acucrack
- Released: April 14, 1998
- Genre: Drum and bass
- Length: 60:07
- Label: Lost in Bass/Slipdisc Records
- Producer: Jason Novak

DJ? Acucrack chronology
Nation State EP (1998)	Mutants of Sound (1998)	The Mutants Are Coming and I Believe They Are of Sound (2000)

Professional ratings
Review scores
Source	Rating
AllMusic	3/5 stars
Pitchfork	7.8/10

Mutants of Sound is the first album by DJ? Acucrack, released in 1998. The album appeared on the CMJ RPM year-end charts for 1998.

== Critical reception ==
The Plain Dealer thought that "though tracks like 'Lust in Space', 'Bitch Universal' and the fidgety 'Get in Me' are so airy in parts that they seem free of gravity, they've also got a vigor that gives away the duo's industrial roots."

AllMusic wrote: "Pulling sounds from a variety of different styles, from drum'n'bass to ambient and big beat, they assemble the bits and pieces in a reasonably appealing fashion, yet with no real understanding of the form."

== Track listing ==
1. "High" – 1:00
2. "Allegra" – 6:18
3. "Swollen with Glee" – 6:32
4. "Lust in Space" – 4:43
5. "Nation State" – 10:54
6. "Bitch Universal" – 7:54
7. "Road Speed Governor" – 2:29
8. "Get in Me" – 6:47
9. "You're Not the Fastest Ship" – 6:14
10. "Strobe" – 2:48
11. "Scientists Playing God" – 4:28
