= Iron Lung Corp =

American electro-industrial music group

- Origin: Chicago, Illinois, United States
- Genres: Electro-industrial
- Years active: 1996–present
- Labels: Cracknation, Re-Constriction, Underground, Inc.
- Past members: Wade Alin; Dan Brill; Dan Dinsmore; Jamie Duffy; Eliot Engelman; Alex Eller; Brian Elza; Gregory A. Lopez; Brian McGarvey; Daniel Neet; Will Nivens; Ethan Novak; Jason Novak; Sean Payne; Eric Powell; Steven Seibold

Iron Lung Corp were an American electro-industrial group based in Chicago and originally formed by Jamie Duffy, Alex Eller, Gregory A. Lopez, Brian McGarvey, Daniel Neet, Will Nivens, Ethan Novak and Jason Novak. They released three full-length albums: Big Shiny Spears (1997), Ditch the Attitude, Pally (2002), Body Snatchers (2013).

== History ==
Iron Lung Corp was formed in 1996 by members of Chicago's Acumen Nation and Albany's The Clay People. The band's had been collaborating for a year when Chase saw them perform live at the Whiskey in Los Angeles and recommended that they pursue a side project. That year the band was signed Chase's label Re-Constriction Records and issued their debut studio album Big Shiny Spears. Underground, Inc. released their second album Ditch the Attitude, Pally which charted at one hundred thirty-five on CMJ Radio 200. In September 2013, the band released their third studio album Body Snatchers on Cracknation Records.

== Discography ==
Studio albums

- Big Shiny Spears (1997, Re-Constriction)
- Ditch the Attitude, Pally (2002, Underground, Inc.)
- Body Snatchers (2013, Cracknation)
