= Territory = Universe =

Territory=Universe

Studio album by Acumen Nation
- Released: March 12, 1996
- Genre: Industrial rock
- Length: 52:52; 63:54 (Conscience Records re-release)
- Label: Fifth Colvmn Records

Acumen Nation chronology
Transmissions from Eville (1994)	Territory=Universe (1996)	Unkind (1997)

Territory=Universe is the second album by Acumen Nation. It was originally released on Fifth Colvmn Records in 1996. A version with additional tracks was released on Conscience Records on May 5, 1998.

== Track listing ==
=== Fifth Colvmn Records version ===
1. "Stone Farm" – 6:01
2. "DJentrify" – 4:09
3. "Candy Prowled" – 4:58
4. "You Deal with This" – 6:16
5. "Queener" – 4:26
6. "Nothing Changes" – 4:35
7. "Mister Sandman I Am" – 3:44
8. "Crazy Stalked Eyes" – 8:15
9. "Fuckface" – 5:46
10. "Mike (Thyroid Mix)" – 4:36

=== Conscience Records version ===
1. "Stone Farm" – 6:01
2. "DJentrify" – 4:09
3. "Candy Prowled" – 4:58
4. "You Deal with This" – 6:14
5. "Queener" – 4:24
6. "Nothing Changes" – 4:35
7. "Mister Sandman I Am" – 3:44
8. "Crazy Stalked Eyes" – 8:15
9. "Fuckface" – 5:38
10. "Mike (Thyroid Mix)" – 4:36
11. "Mike (Remix)" – 4:55
12. "Queener (Remix)" – 6:25

== Personnel ==
- Jason Novak – programming, guitar, vocals
- Jamie Duffy – guitar, engineering
- Gregory Lopez – drums, bass, moog
- Ethan Novak – guitar, drums, bass guitar, washboard
