= Cheesy (album) =

Studio album by En Esch
- Released: August 31, 1993
- Genre: Industrial
- Length: 52:53
- Label: TVT
- Producer: En Esch

Cheesy is a solo album by En Esch of KMFDM and Slick Idiot. It was released on August 31, 1993, on TVT.

== History ==
Six tracks were recorded in Hamburg, Germany, with Günter Schulz and KMFDM's then-engineer Blank Fontana: "Cum", "Gypsy Queen", "Ich Bin", "Rule the Mob", "Granola", "Outro", and "The Past Is Beyond Recovery". These tracks would have composed En Esch's half of the KMFDM album Apart. Wax Trax! Records rejected Esch's tracks for not sounding enough like KMFDM. Instead, Sascha Konietzko added additional songs and remixes to those he had recorded for Apart and changed the name of the album to Money. The rest of the tracks for what was initially called Cheesy Fun were recorded later in various locations to fill out what then became Esch's solo album.

The track "Ich Bin" was sampled and used in the Pigface song "Alles Ist Mein" on the album Fook.

== Track listing ==
No.	Title	Writer(s)	Length
1.	"Go Insane"	Sean Joyce, Sande Satoskar, En Esch	2:35
2.	"Confidence"	Esch, Johann Bley	4:15
3.	"Cum"	Esch, Günter Schulz	4:23
4.	"Gypsy Queen"	Esch, Schulz	4:26
5.	"Ich Bin"	Esch, Schulz	3:50
6.	"Sweet Venus"	Esch	2:58
7.	"Rule the Mob"	Esch, Schulz	3:26
8.	"Soy Botones"	Esch, Bley	6:43
9.	"Daktari"	Esch, Andrew Weiss	11:53
10.	"Granola"	Esch, Schulz	3:50
11.	"Outro"	Esch	0:55
12.	"The Past Is Beyond Recovery"	Esch, Schulz	3:39

== Personnel ==
- En Esch – vocals, programming, guitar (1, 2, 8), drums (2, 4, 5, 9, 10), percussion (8, 9, 12), keyboards (9), harp (9), engineering (2, 6, 8, 9), production, mixing, digital editing, artwork
- Günter Schulz – guitars (3–5, 7, 10–12), programming (7, 10, 12), vocals (3)

=== Additional personnel ===
- Bibi Abel – vocals (4, 7)
- Bernadette – vocals (6)
- Blank Fontana – programming (10), engineering (3–5, 7, 10–12)
- Greg Frey – engineering (9)
- Monika Georg – vocals (3)
- Mandra Gora – programming (2, 8), vocals (2, 8), percussion (8)
- Rob Hagopian – bass (1)
- Sean Joyce – vocals (1), programming (1), production (1), mixing (1)
- Sascha Konietzko – digital editing, artwork
- Andre Meyer – vocals (4)
- Sande Satoskar – programming (1), engineering (1), production (1), mixing (1)
- Jacques Sehy – cover photo
- Christine Siewert – vocals (12)
- Sanne Sprenger – vocals (2, 8)
- Liisa Vihma – vocals (3, 11)
- Dean Ween – guitar (9)
- Andrew Weiss – bass (9), keyboards (9), percussion (9), engineering (9), production (9), mixing (9)
