= The Headhunter Demos =

2000 EP by The Clay People

EP by The Clay People
- Released: 2000
- Genre: Industrial rock
- Length: 19:37
- Label: Overit
- Producer: Neil Kernon

The Clay People chronology
The Clay People (1998)	The Headhunter Demos (2000)	Waking the Dead (2007)

The Headhunter Demos is an extended play record by The Clay People, released in 2000 by Overit Records.

== Track listing ==
All tracks are written by The clay people.

No.	Title	Length
1.	"My X-Ploding Head"	5:22
2.	"Broken Kisses"	4:01
3.	"Loves.Thrills.Breaks.Kills."	3:28
4.	"Pariah"	3:01
5.	"Stone"	3:47

== Personnel ==
Adapted from The Headhunter Demos liner notes.

Clay People

- Dan Dinsmore – drums
- Mike Guzzardi – guitar
- Brian McGarvey – bass guitar
- Daniel Neet – lead vocals

Additional performers

- Wade Alin – programming

Production and design

- Paul Benedetti – mixing (1–3)
- Neil Kernon – production (4, 5) and mixing (4, 5)

== Release history ==
Region	Date	Label	Format	Catalog
United States	2000	Overit	CD	
