= Humanoids from the Deep (album) =

Studio album by DJ? Acucrack
- Released: October 2, 2007
- Recorded: December, 2005 – August, 2007
- Genre: Drum and bass
- Length: 61:13
- Label: Cracknation
- Producer: Jason Novak

DJ? Acucrack chronology
| Killing Mobius (2005) | Humanoids from the Deep (2007) |

Professional ratings
Review scores
| Source | Rating |
|---|---|
| Popmatters | link |

Humanoids from the Deep (2007) is the sixth full-length studio album by DJ? Acucrack and the first to feature no contributions from member Jamie Duffy.

== Track listing ==
1. "Abomination Rise" – 3:56
2. "Terror Train" – 4:37
3. "Meninges" – 5:49
4. "Reptilian Race" – 6:19
5. "The Speed of Darkness" – 7:17
6. "Autodeceiver UK" – 3:47
7. "Destroy All Robots" – 7:54
8. "Rust Presses" – 4:00
9. "Wickerman" – 4:24
10. "Iced Ages" – 5:33
11. "Belial" – 7:37

== Credits ==
- Written, performed, and produced by Jason Novak
- Live bass and additional textures on tracks 5, 10, and 11 by Dean Garcia
- Backing vocals on track 10 by Kelly Britton
- Additional vocals on tracks 1 and 6 by MC Geist
