= Big Shiny Spears =

Studio album by Iron Lung Corp
- Released: March 25, 1997
- Recorded: 1996
- Genre: Electro-industrial
- Length: 48:05
- Label: Re-Constriction
- Producer: Iron Lung Corp

Iron Lung Corp chronology
Big Shiny Spears (1997)	Ditch the Attitude, Pally (2002)

Big Shiny Spears is the debut studio album of Iron Lung Corp, released on March 25, 1997, by Re-Constriction Records.

== Reception ==
Aiding & Abetting gave Big Shiny Spears a mixed review, praising the production but noting that "this sort of music works much better at a higher speed, and that's all there is to it" and "there's not much substance behind the great sound." The album was similarly received by Larry Dean Miles at Black Monday, who gave the album a mixed review but praised Nitzer Ebb's "Join in the Murderous Chant" and said "ILC have done justice here, creating another masterpiece from the parts of previous, god-like songs" Scott Hefflon of Lollipop Magazine compared the material favorably to Cubanate, saying "a few dull-as-a-dead-fuck instrumentals ensure their searching artiste credentials, and the White Zombified vocals ensure that the kids’ll just love it." A critic at Sonic Boom agreed, saying "the album appears very lopsided in places, and should probably be considered as a new Acumen release rather than a collaboration effort." However, they noted that "there are plenty of the usual tongue in cheek lyrical wonderments as well as a healthy dose of chunky guitars to thrill the headbanger in you."

== Track listing ==
No.	Title	Lyrics	Music	Length
1.	"Don't Touch Me"	Jamie Duffy, Ethan Novak		1:33
2.	"Pretty (Like a Porn Star)"	Daniel Neet	Jason Novak	4:35
3.	"Crobar America"	Alex Eller	Iron Lung Corp	4:06
4.	"The Great Nothing"	Ethan Novak	Jason Novak	4:44
5.	"Chemikaze"	Jason Novak	Jason Novak	4:15
6.	"Frozen Shallow"	Jason Novak	Jason Novak	4:20
7.	"(Theme From) Iron Lung"		Jason Novak	2:09
8.	"Skirt"	Duane Beer, Daniel Neet	Iron Lung Corp	3:47
9.	"Join in the Murderous Chant I" (Nitzer Ebb cover)	Bon Harris, Douglas McCarthy	Bon Harris, Douglas McCarthy	2:52
10.	"Join in the Murderous Chant II" (Nitzer Ebb cover)	Bon Harris, Douglas McCarthy	Bon Harris, Douglas McCarthy	4:00
11.	"Witchita"	Iron Lung Corp	Iron Lung Corp	9:26
12.	"Sick"		Jamie Duffy	2:18

== Personnel ==
Adapted from the Big Shiny Spears liner notes.

Iron Lung Corp

- Jamie Duffy (as Kidd Vicious) – guitar, recording, mixing
- Alex Eller (as Justin Tate) – vocals
- Gregory A. Lopez (as Nez Pierce) – bass guitar, Moog synthesizer (7)
- Brian McGarvey (as Brian Justice) – guitar
- Daniel Neet – vocals
- Will Nivens (as Lex) – electronics
- Ethan Novak (as Ethan Alien) – drums, guitar
- Jason Novak (as Jawson) – electronics, guitar, vocals, editing

Additional musicians

- Paul Dillon – guitar (11)
- Stella Katsoudas – additional vocals (5)
- Zlatko Hukic – electronics (12), assistant engineering

Production and design

- Jason Bacher – assistant engineering
- Jay Fisher (as Jay You Asshole) – assistant engineering
- Trey Fratt – assistant engineering
- Dirk Frederick – illustrations
- Matt Gibson (as Sour Matt) – assistant engineering
- Iron Lung Corp – production
- Mama Kidd – photography
- Mangus – photography
- Esther Nevarez (as Esther Bunny) – assistant engineering
- Solaris – cover art
- Mike Tholen – mastering
- Ed Tinley (as Apple Ed) – assistant engineering
- Whos Fred – assistant engineering

== Release history ==
Region	Date	Label	Format	Catalog
1997	United States	Re-Constriction	CD	REC-021
