= Anticore =

Studio album by Acumen Nation
- Released: September 19, 2006
- Recorded: 2004–2006
- Genre: Industrial rock
- Length: 65:48
- Label: Cracknation / Crash Music Inc.
- Producers: Jason Novak and Jamie Duffy

Acumen Nation chronology
What the Fuck?: 10 Years of Armed Audio Warfare (2005)	''Anticore'' (2006)	Psycho the Rapist (2007)

Professional ratings
Review scores
Source	Rating
Allmusic	3/5 stars
ReGen magazine	4.5/5 stars

Anticore (2006) is the seventh album by Acumen Nation.

== Track listing ==
1. "Bliss" - 3:14
2. "The Blind Pig" - 3:12
3. "Day Care" - 3:34
4. "Black Son Hole" - 4:21
5. "My Life's Last Breath" - 3:42
6. "Tools in the Blood Shed" - 6:34
7. "Branch Davidian Style" - 2:54
8. "Caustic Perimeter" - 5:21
9. "No Arms No Legs" - 4:01
10. "Jesus Loves You" - 4:11
11. "P.O.D.O.A." - 3:23
12. "Haliburton Rape Trail" - 3:37
13. "Destroyasaurus" - 5:44
14. "Polhemic" - 7:00
15. "Message From the Grave" - 5:00

All music and lyrics written by Jason Novak, except...

- "Bliss" co-written by Dan Brill
- "The Blind Pig" music by Acumen Nation
- "P.O.D.O.A." music by Jamie Duffy

== Personnel ==
- Jason Novak – vocals, guitars, electronics
- Jamie Duffy – guitars, electronics
- Eliot Engelman – bass
- Dan Brill – drums
- Brian Elza – guest guitars on "The Blind Pig" and "Black Son Hole"
- Lucia Cifarelli – guest vocals on "My Life's Last Breath"
