= More Machine Than Man =

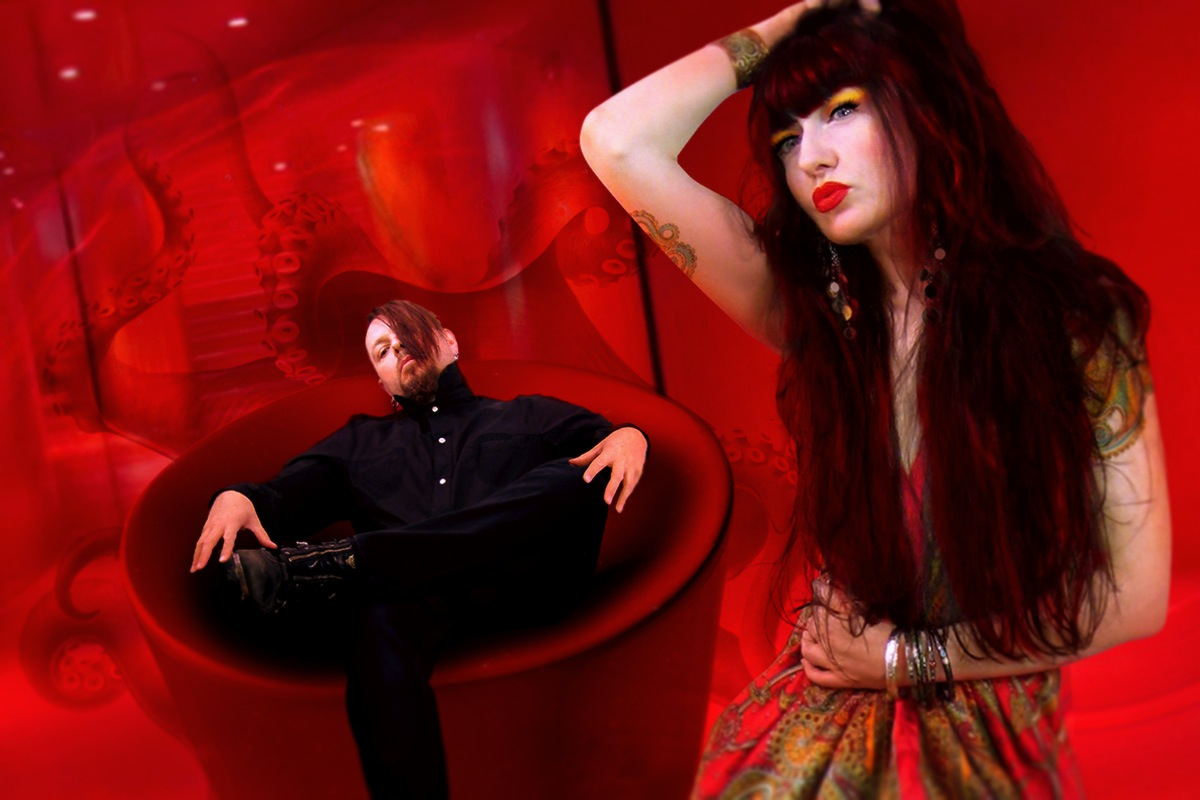
- MMTM promo photo from their album Dark Matter

Background information
- Origin: Boston, Massachusetts
- Genres: Industrial rock
- Years active: 1999–present
- Labels: Independent Artist, Black Flames Records, Underground, Inc.
- Members: Tasha Katrine – vocals, programming, arrangement, lyrics, and production Robzilla – vocals, guitar, programming, arrangement, lyrics and production
- Website: http://www.mmtm.net

More Machine Than Man is an American industrial rock / coldwave / goth rock band. It was formed by two musicians under the pseudonyms, Tasha Katrine and Tech (later changed to Robzilla). More Machine Than Man has independently released three full-length albums. More Machine Than Man released one EP on the label Underground Inc. and one album on Black Flames Records.

From Seattle, More Machine Than Man independently released the 12 song album titled, Dark Matter in August 2012. Dark Matter includes two songs produced by En Esch of Slick Idiot and one song with a keyboard performance by Romell Regulacion of Razed in Black.

The band's live performances integrate original video content, created by Tasha Katrine and Robzilla.

== Touring ==
- MMTM Summer Tour 2001
- MMTM Fall Tour 2002
- Razed in Black Damaged Tour 2003
- MMTM Incision 2004 Tour
- Eccentrik 2004
- Wave Gotik Treffen 2005
- Freaks United 2005
- Convergence (goth festival) 11 2005
- Slick Idiot xSCREWtiating tour 2006

== Discography ==
- Technophile, Demo, 1999 independently released
- Abduction Kit, EP, 1999 independently released
- Robot, LP, 2000 independently released
- Electrolust, LP, 2001 Black Flames Records
- Notes from the Real Underground #3, Compilation, 2002 Underground Inc.
- Mutations: A Tribute to Alice Cooper, Compilation, 2002 Ankhor Records
- Binary Sex, EP, 2003 Underground Inc and Black Flames Records
- Dark Matter, LP, 2012 independently released
- Something Ventured, Nothing Gained, LP, Sep 18, 2014 Nilaihah Records
