= Psycho the Rapist =

Studio album by Acumen Nation
- Released: October 2, 2007
- Recorded: December 2006 – August 2007
- Genre: Industrial rock
- Length: 65:35
- Label: Cracknation
- Producer: Jason Novak

Acumen Nation chronology
| Anticore (2006) | Psycho the Rapist (2007) |

Psycho the Rapist, released on October 2, 2007, is the eighth album by Acumen Nation.

== Name ==
The name Psycho the rapist is a jocular rebracketing of psychotherapist.

== Track listing ==
1. "Fanglorious" - 4:57
2. "Hatchet Harry" - 4:16
3. "Elective Surgical Strike" - 4:34
4. "Sirvix" - 5:05
5. "No Imagination" - 6:17
6. "Remedial Math" - 4:37
7. "Idle Lysergic Corpse" - 6:44
8. "Holy Terror" - 5:26
9. "200 Bodies Per Minute" - 5:05
10. "Penultimatum" - 7:57
11. "Acumen Trepanation" - 10:37

== Personnel ==
Written, performed and produced by Jason Novak
Live drums by Dan Brill
Additional sounds by Jamie Duffy
Additional programming on "Holy Terror" by Sean Payne
Special hi-hat programming on "Closer" by D. Broussier
