= Mona Mur =

German vocalist, composer and audio designer

- Born: Sabine Bredy; Hamburg, Germany
- Label: Give/Take

Sabine Bredy (born 29 July 1960), known professionally as Mona Mur, is a German vocalist, composer and audio designer.

== Early years ==
Sabine Bredy was born in Hamburg to Polish parents. In 1982 she collaborated with FM Einheit, Marc Chung and Alex Hacke of Einstürzende Neubauten.

In 1982, "Mona Mur and die Mieter" recorded the 12" Jeszcze Polska. This release received international attention, chosen as NME's single of the week slot by Chris Bohn and getting airplay by John Peel. However the group decided to disband soon after this release.

Another Mona Mur incarnation was in Berlin between 1984 and 1986. She played with members of Einstürzende Neubauten, Stricher Flucht nach Vorn and organist Nikko Weidemann in the Netherlands, Denmark, Sweden, Bremen with Sonic Youth and Berlin.

In 1986 Dieter Meier of Yello became her producer. They hired JJ Burnel and David Greenfield of The Stranglers and the album "Mona Mur" was released in 1988.

With Joachim Witt she wrote and recorded two songs called "Casablanca" and "Wild ist die Welt" for a 7". This, according to Mona Mur, was never released.

== After 1990 to present ==
In 1990, A second album, "Warsaw" was recorded with Grzegorz Ciechowski of Republika and the Warsaw Philharmonic Orchestra in Warsaw. It was unreleased until 2015. Polish singer Katarzyna Groniec released cover versions of four songs from "Warsaw", making a hit with one of the songs in Poland.

Mona took a break from singing and turned her energy to Taekwondo, achieving the 3rd DAN. She entered the German National Team and became International German Vice Champion twice.

Mona Mur collaborated with multi-instrumentalist and mediaevalist, Christian St.Claire or Raymond Watts in the 90s.

In 1996 she founded her company monamur music production, producing music and sound design for computer games Kane & Lynch 2: Dog Days (EIDOS 2010), Ballance (ATARI 2004), SABOTAGE (dtp 2007) and media-art projects, videos and installations by Franz John, Heiko Daxl and Ingeborg Fülepp among others.

In 2004, three of her tracks are to be found in the soundtrack of Fatih Akin's film Head-on.

In 2006, she performed at the M'era Luna Festival.

Her CD-compilation "Into Your Eye", a retrospective collection of her more than 20 years of work, which not only contains the typical 80s punk wave elements of her music and some of the orchestrated Warsaw tracks but also new dark wave songs written and produced with Christian St. Claire.

Since 2007 she has collaborated with En Esch and Slick Idiot as producer and guitarist for their 2009 collaboration album 120 Tage.

In 2014, she performed a demon in FM Einheit's Zurich theatre piece ‘Artaud_Into The Explosion’.

== Discography ==
- 2023: Warsaw (Re-Release)
- 2023: Delinquent (Re-Release)
- 2022: The Original Band 1984–86
- 2022: Mona Mur: Snake island
- 2019: Mona Mur: Delinquent
- 2018: Mona Mur & Miron Zownir : Those days are over (10 June)
- 2015: Mona Mur: Warsaw
- 2004: Into Your Eye
- 1991: Warsaw
- 1988: Mona Mur
- 1983: Casablanca – Nur Phantasie (unveröffentlicht)
- 1982: Mona Mur: Jeszcze Polska (12")

=== with En Esch ===
- 2011 Do With Me What You Want
- 2009 120 Tage - The Fine Art of Beauty and Violence
- 2019 REMIXES -No Devotion Records

=== with FM Einheit and En Esch ===
- 2013 Terre Haute
