= More Human Heart =

Studio album by Acumen Nation
- Released: September 30, 1997
- Genre: Industrial rock; electronic rock; industrial metal
- Length: 56:02
- Label: Conscience Records

Acumen Nation chronology
Unkind (1997)	More Human Heart (1997)	If You Were (1998)

Professional ratings
Review scores
Source	Rating
AllMusic	4/5 stars

More Human Heart (1997) is the third album released by Acumen Nation, on Conscience Records.

== Track listing ==
1. "Ventilator" (Jason Novak) – 6:01
2. "If You Were" (J. Novak) – 3:48
3. "Unkind" (J. Novak) – 3:38
4. "Cancerine (J. Novak/Ethan Novak) – 3:12
5. "Revelations per Minute" (J. Novak) – 4:57
6. "Bleed for You" (J. Novak) – 5:37
7. "The Funny Thing Is..." (J. Novak/E. Novak) – 5:10
8. "Fuck Yer Brains Out" (J. Novak) – 7:07
9. "Ugly on the Inside" (J. Novak) – 4:48
10. "Punkass" (J. Novak/E. Novak) – 2:44
11. "Dreamheart/Crush'd" (J. Novak) – 9:00

== Personnel ==
- Jason Novak
- Ethan Novak
- Jamie Duffy
- Gregory Lopez
