= Product naming =

Process of deciding a brand name for a product

In marketing, product naming is the discipline of deciding what a product will be called, and is very similar in concept and approach to the process of deciding on a name for a company or organization. Product naming is considered a critical part of the branding process, which includes all of the marketing activities that affect the brand image, such as positioning and the design of logo, packaging and the product itself. The process involved in product naming can take months or years to complete. Some key steps include specifying the objectives of the branding, developing the product name itself, evaluating names through target market testing and focus groups, choosing a final product name, and finally identifying it as a trademark for protection.

== See also ==
- Brand development
- Corporate identity
- List of renamed products
- Naming
- Naming firms
- Product naming convention
- Project code name
- Rebranding
- Seasonal packaging
