= Killing Mobius =

Studio album by DJ? Acucrack
- Released: August 30, 2005
- Recorded: Spring 2005
- Genre: Drum and bass
- Length: 62:54
- Label: Cracknation
- Producer: Jason Novak

DJ? Acucrack chronology
| Mako Vs. Geist (2004) | Killing Mobius (2005) |

Professional ratings
Review scores
| Source | Rating |
|---|---|
| Tiny Mix Tapes | 4.5/5 marks |
| Yip.org | favorable |

Killing Mobius (2005) is the fifth studio full-length album by DJ? Acucrack.

== Track listing ==
1. "Stop All Sounds" (Jason Novak) – 2:08
2. "Loudmouth" (Novak) – 5:03
3. "All Up in My Face" (Novak) – 3:57
4. "Slowly Regaining Consciousness" (Novak) – 3:54
5. "Temple of the Mourning Star" (Novak) – 5:34
6. "Gangland II" (Novak) – 5:41
7. "Pulling Birds in a Crisis Situation" (Novak) – 4:53
8. "Send More Paramedics" (Novak) – 5:07
9. "Behind the Wheel" (Novak) – 5:54
10. "Recalx" (Novak) – 5:02
11. "Thalidomide" (Novak) – 6:07
12. "Sniper Code (MC Geist Remix)" (Novak) – 5:29
13. "So to Speak (Sascha KMFDM Remix) (Novak/Toni Halliday) – 4:00

== Personnel ==
- Jason Novak
- Jamie Duffy
- Kelly Britton – Vocals (11)
- MC Geist – Remixing (12)
- Sascha Konietzko – Remixing (13)
- Toni Halliday – Vocals (13)
