= Name (disambiguation) =

A name is a word or term used for identification.

Name or NAME may also refer to:

== Arts, entertainment, and media ==
- "Name" (song), a song by Goo Goo Dolls from their album A Boy Named Goo
- NAME (group), a performing group
- The Name (play), a 1995 play by the Norwegian writer Jon Fosse
- "The Name" (The Amazing World of Gumball), a 2014 television episode
- "The Name" (Dilbert), a 1999 television episode

== Computing ==
- NAME (dispersion model), an atmospheric pollution dispersion model
- .name, a generic top-level domain for use on the Internet
- Name.com, a domain registrar
- Identifier (computer science), an entity name in programming languages and information processing systems

== Other uses ==
- Name (sports) (also known as: the jersey name, shirt name, squad name, or uniform name), is the name worn on a player's uniform
- "Name", a wealthy individual who pledges their wealth to underwrite losses at Lloyd's of London
- "Ha Shem", aka The Name, a reference to the Hebrew Tetragrammaton YHWH
- North American Midway Entertainment, or NAME, a fair midway service provider
- North Africa and the Middle East
- Personal name, the full set of names given to an individual

== See also ==
- Named (disambiguation)
- Names (disambiguation)
- Naming (disambiguation)
