= Waking the Dead (The Clay People album) =

2007 studio album by The Clay People

Studio album by The Clay People
- Released: May 27, 2007
- Studio: Scarlet East Studios (Albany, NY)
- Genre: Industrial rock
- Length: 53:00
- Label: Overit

The Clay People chronology
The Headhunter Demos (2000)	Waking the Dead (2007)	Demon Hero and Other Extraordinary Phantasmagoric Anomalies & Fables (2018)

Waking the Dead is the fourth studio album by The Clay People, released on May 27, 2007 by Overit Records.

== Track listing ==
All tracks are written by John Delehanty, Dan Dinsmore, Brian McGarvey and Daniel Neet, except "When Heavens Fall", "Burning Tao" and "Secret" co-written with Walter Flakus and "Burning Tao" co-written with John Stevens.

No.	Title	Length
1.	"Supersonic Overdrive"	3:23
2.	"Waking the Dead"	3:06
3.	"Swerve"	4:17
4.	"When Heavens Fall"	3:38
5.	"Burning Tao"	5:10
6.	"The Ancient One Interlude"	0:40
7.	"Obstacle (Failure)"	4:01
8.	"Never Give Up"	4:02
9.	"Secrets"	4:39
10.	"Be Mine"	1:35
11.	"Lost"	3:06
12.	"Saturn Vs. The Dreamer (Emptiness)"	4:35
13.	"Monsters"	3:21
14.	"Valentine"	3:46
15.	"Happy"	3:39

== Personnel ==
Adapted from the Waking the Dead liner notes.

Clay People

- John Delehanty – vocals, guitar, synthesizer, production, engineering, recording, mixing (4–6, 8–10)
- Dan Dinsmore – drums, executive-producer
- Brian McGarvey – vocals, production
- Daniel Neet – lead vocals, synthesizer, production

Additional performers

- Eric Schwanke – bass guitar

Production and design

- Andrew Ehrlich – recording assistant, engineering
- Neil Kernon – mixing (1–3, 7, 11–15)
- Philip Montelone – cover art, design

== Release history ==
Region	Date	Label	Format	Catalog
United States	2007	Overit	CD	
