= The Clay People (album) =

1998 studio album by The Clay People

Studio album by The Clay People
- Released: May 12, 1998
- Recorded: February 6 – March 6, 1998
- Studio: Village Productions (Tornillo, Texas)
- Genre: Industrial metal, alternative metal
- Length: 47:09
- Label: Slipdisc
- Producer: Neil Kernon

The Clay People chronology
Stone-Ten Stitches (1997)	The Clay People (1998)	The Headhunter Demos (2000)

Singles from The Clay People
- 1. "Awake" Released: 1998; 2. "Who Am I?" Released: 1998; 3. "Car Bomb" Released: 1999

The Clay People is the third studio album by American rock band the Clay People. It was released on May 12, 1998, by Slipdisc Records.

== Reception ==
Professional ratings
Review scores
Source	Rating
AllMusic	3/5 stars

In his review for The Clay People, Greg Prato of AllMusic praised the group embracing a more organic sound that would appeal to heavy metal enthusiasts. Aiding & Abetting gave the album a positive review, saying "Clay People has infused the metal guts with something very alive." Sonic Boom lambasted Neil Kernon's production as being responsible for "turning an excellent Coldwave act into nothing more than a glorified Metal band" but praised Daniel Neet's vocal contributions.

== Track listing ==
No.	Title	Length
1.	"Awake"	3:29
2.	"Plug"	5:17
3.	"Mechanized Mind"	4:02
4.	"Calling Spaceship: Damien Grief"	5:22
5.	"Car Bomb (Am I Human?)"	4:21
6.	"Fade Away"	4:16
7.	"Raygun Girls"	2:54
8.	"Dying to Be You"	4:02
9.	"Thread"	4:40
10.	"Ghostwishing"	3:56
11.	"Who Am I?"	4:49

== Personnel ==
Adapted from the album's liner notes.

Clay People

- Dan Dinsmore – drums, design
- Mike Guzzardi – guitar
- Brian McGarvey – guitar
- Daniel Neet – lead vocals
- D. Patrick Walsh – bass, design

Production and design

- Wade Alin – programming
- Frank Chackler – executive producer
- Joe Gastwirt – mastering
- Scott Gries – photography
- Neil Kernon – production, recording, mixing
- Jana Leon – cover art, photography
- Dana Schneider – cover art, sculpture

== Release history ==
Region	Date	Label	Format	Catalog
United States	1998	Slipdisc	CD	008 633 127-2
