= Naming firm =

A naming firm is a type of marketing service that specializes in the linguistic art and science of product and company onomastics.

Naming firms develop brand names and product names that are typically categorized as evocative, descriptive, invented or experiential. They often suggest taglines or positioning statements, and might also consult on logo design and corporate identity. Some agencies also include market research and consumer focus group testing.

Most naming professionals provide trademark services as part of their process, vetting names through a global trademark screening. Legal counsel is generally secured for trademark registration and application activities.
