= The 5ifth Column =

Studio album by Acumen Nation
- Released: 14 May 2002
- Genre: Crossover, industrial metal
- Length: 64:48
- Label: Cracknation, Underground Inc./Invisible Records
- Producer: Lord Pickles and Kidd Knobbs

Acumen Nation chronology
Live Farewell 2001 (2001)	The 5ifth Column (2002)	Coming Down: The Bastard Remix Album (2002)

The 5ifth Column is the fifth album by Acumen Nation. "Margasuck" and "Tone Deaf" are remixed tracks from Strike 4.

== Track listing ==
1. "Monster Zero" – 1:56
2. "Parasite Mine" – 3:47
3. "Just a Bastard" – 4:31
4. "Liquid Hater" – 4:25
5. "C-Cection" – 5:33
6. "Margasuck" – 3:04
7. "Dirty Fighter" – 3:28
8. "Demasculator" – 5:45
9. "Recaster" – 3:48
10. "Rally and Sustain" – 6:05
11. "Knowing This..." – 5:08
12. "Wraith of Calixto" – 7:51
13. "Tone Deaf" – 5:49
14. "Mothra" – 2:58
15. "Liquid Hater (Acucrack Remix)" – 6:38

All music and lyrics written by Jason Novak.

== Personnel ==
- Jason Novak – vocals, guitars, programming, bitching
- Jamie Duffy – guitars, programming, erotica
- Eliot Engelman – bass guitar, patience
- Dan Brill – drums, inflatables, comedy
- Ethan Novak – drums on tracks 6 & 13
