= 120 Tage =

Studio album by Mona Mur and En Esch
- Released: February 15, 2009
- Genre: Electro-industrial
- Length: 59:49
- Languages: German, English
- Label: Pale

Mona Mur and En Esch chronology
120 Tage (2009)	Do with Me What You Want (2011)

120 Tage - The Fine Art of Beauty and Violence is an electro-industrial studio collaboration between German musicians Mona Mur and En Esch (of KMFDM, Pigface, and Slick Idiot). It was released on February 15, 2009, on Pale Music International. The English translation of the album's title is 120 Days.

== Release ==
120 Tage was released on February 15, 2009, through Pale Music's web site, and later digitally through KMFDM's web store with two additional bonus tracks.

== Track listing ==
No.	Title	Lyrics	Music	Length
1.	"Candy Cane"	Mona Mur	En Esch, Mur	3:43
2.	"Die Ballade vom Ertrunkenen Mädchen" (arr. Esch, Mur, Nikko Weidemann)	Bertolt Brecht	Kurt Weill	3:14
3.	"120 Tage"			4:13
4.	"The Thin Red Line"	Mur	Esch, Mur	5:05
5.	"Visions & Lies"	Mur	Esch, Mur	5:10
6.	"Eintagsfliegen"	Mur	Alexander Hacke, FM Einheit, Mur, Weidemann, Siewert Johannsen, Thomas Stern	4:16
7.	"Snake"	Mur	Mur, Weidemann	6:47
8.	"Mon Amour"	Mur	Einheit, Mur, Weidemann	4:57
9.	"Surabaya Johnny" (arr. Esch, Mur, Weidemann)	Brecht	Weill	8:00
10.	"Der Song von Mandelay" (arr. Esch, Mur, Weidemann)	Brecht	Weill	3:32
11.	"The Wound"	Mur	Esch, Mur	10:51
12.	"Candy Cane (Acoustic Version)" (KMFDM web store bonus)			3:55
13.	"Candy Cane (Steve Morell Disco Death Tech Mix)" (KMFDM web store bonus)			6:52
Total length:				70:36
