= Firetribe =

1993 studio album by The Clay People

Studio album by Clay People
- Released: May 1993
- Studio: Various: (Albany, New York); Hyland Studios; (Albany, New York); Electric Music Foundation
- Genre: Industrial metal, alternative metal
- Length: 50:41
- Label: Re-Constriction
- Producer: Clay People, George Hagegeorge, Art Snay

Clay People chronology
Toy Box (1991)	Firetribe (1993)	The Iron Icon (1995)

Firetribe is the debut studio album of The Clay People, released in May 1993 by Re-Constriction Records.

== Reception ==
Professional ratings
Review scores
Source	Rating
AllMusic	1.5/5 stars

Jason Anderson of AllMusic gave the album a negative review, calling Firetribe "slightly ill-defined" and "one of the group's lesser offerings", but noted that the band would improve on following releases. Aiding & Abetting credited the band for providing the industrial music scene with a unique personality.

== Track listing ==
All tracks are written by Kevin Bakerian, Alex Eller, Daniel Neet and Karla Williams.

No.	Title	Length
1.	"Deadman"	2:00
2.	"Crudsong"	3:22
3.	"In Chaos"	4:47
4.	"Close My Eye"	3:42
5.	"Godsick"	2:30
6.	"Nothing"	3:40
7.	"Scripture"	2:43
8.	"Spit"	3:54
9.	"Skin"	3:25
10.	"Void"	4:25
11.	"Fire Eyes"	3:20
12.	"Teeth to Grind"	1:36

== Personnel ==
Adapted from the Firetribe liner notes.

Clay People

- Kevin Bakerian – drums
- Alex Eller – keyboards, programming
- Daniel Neet – lead vocals
- Karla Williams – electric guitar

Production and design

- Paul Benedetti – engineering (1–3, 5, 7, 10, 11)
- Rocco Nigro – cover art, illustrations
- Clay People – production, design
- Pete Pryor – cover art
- George Hagegeorge – production (1–3, 5, 7, 10, 11), engineering (4, 6, 8, 9, 12), pre-production (6, 8, 9)
- Mike Rose – design
- Art Snay – production (4, 6, 8, 9, 12), engineering (4, 6, 8, 9, 12)

== Release history ==
Region	Date	Label	Format	Catalog
United States	1993	Re-Constriction	CD	REC-006
