= Slick Idiot =

German band

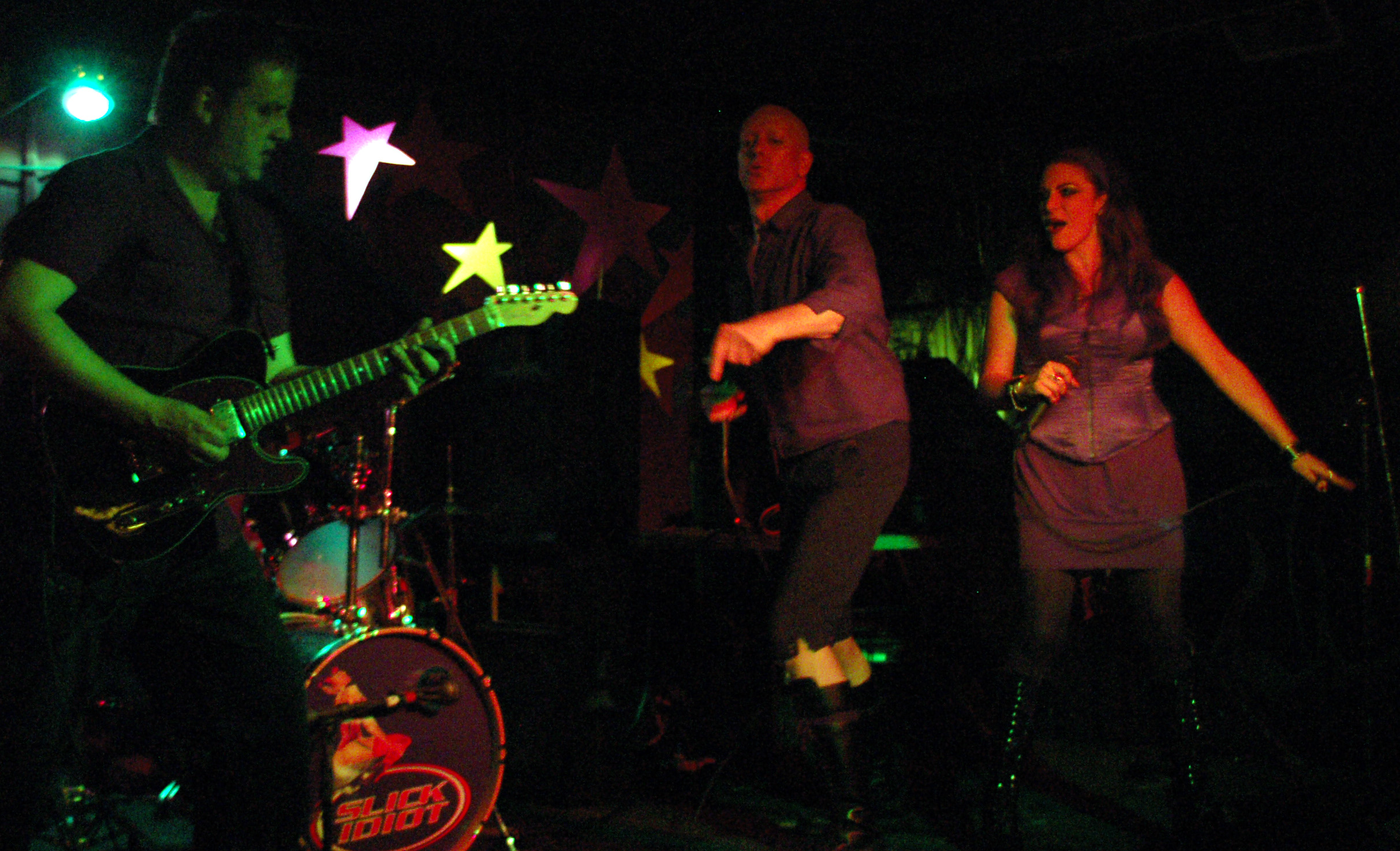
- Slick Idiot performing in 2010

Background information
- Origin: New York City, U.S.
- Genres: Industrial rock, electronic
- Years active: 1999–present
- Labels: Cleopatra, Itchy, Underground, Inc.
- Spinoff of: KMFDM
- Members: En Esch; Günter Schulz; Erica Dilanjian
- Past members: See below
- Website: slickidiot.de

Slick Idiot is a German electronic and industrial band.

== History ==
Slick Idiot was formed by former KMFDM members Günter Schulz and En Esch, following the 1999 breakup of KMFDM. Before taking on the name Slick Idiot, Esch and Schulz contributed a cover of Nine Inch Nails' "Terrible Lie" to Cleopatra Records' Covered in Nails 2: A Tribute to Nine Inch Nails. After releasing DickNity for purchase online, Slick Idiot, with core live members Mel Fuher and drummer/programmer Michael J. Carrasquillo, embarked on the "High Life for Low Lives" US tour in 2002. Cleopatra Records then re-released DickNity with a bonus remix by Christoph Schneider of Rammstein. In late 2003, Esch and Schulz joined as members of Pigface for the "United II" tour. In October 2004, Screwtinized was released online via their website and garnered rave reviews. En Esch toured again with Pigface on the "Free for All" US tour in 2005, while Schulz devoted his time to forming the side project SCHULZ with vocalist Jeff Borden. The band co-headlined, along with Hanzel und Gretyl, the first Gothicfest at the Odeum Expo Center in Illinois. In 2006, Slick Idiot completed a full US tour called the "xSCREWciating Tour", with More Machine Than Man. The tour saw the addition of live members Gregg Ziemba on drums and Victoria Levy on vocals.

As a tribute to the 2008 UEFA European Football Championship, which took place in Austria and Switzerland, and to the Austrian capital Vienna, Slick Idiot recorded a version of a famous traditional Austrian song, "Wien, Du Stadt meiner Träume", written by Rudolf Sieczynski. The song was released on 12 May 2008 as a digital download only.

Slick Idiot toured the US in late 2009, performing almost 50 shows in two months. The band released the album S U C K S E S S on 4 September 2009.

On 29 May 2010, Slick Idiot began the "Sucksess 2010 USA Tour" in Phoenix, Arizona, and continued the tour around the US. Accompanying Esch and Schulz were drummer Ziemba and singer Erica Dilanjian. Singer Mona Mur appeared as a featured guest to perform songs from 120 Tage – The Fine Art of Beauty and Violence, a collaboration album between Mur and Esch. Mur accompanied the band in 2010 and 2011 on two full Canada tours, and again in 2012 on the "Slick Idiot vs Mona Mur & En Esch Classick Tour 2012" with Dan Simoes (of Alvalanker) on guitar and Ethan Moseley (of Promonium Jesters) on drums. Mur again performed the Slick Idiot female vocal parts along with songs from the Mur and Esch collaboration.

== Members ==
=== Current line-up ===
- En Esch – vocals, percussion, guitars, programming (1999–present)
- Günter Schulz – guitars, programming (1999–present)
- Erica Dilanjian – vocals (2009–present)

=== Guest members ===
- Michelle Boback – vocals (1999–2004)
- Trixie Reiss – vocals (2000–2009, 2015–2016)
- Abby Travis – vocals (2004)
- Kasey James – vocals (2004)
- Krisa Duiton – vocals (2004)
- Charlie Zahn – saxophone (2004)
- Victor Con Fuse – trombone (2004)
- Rick Van Stonah – trumpet (2004)
- Chuck "Chains" Lenihan – guitars (2009)
- Hope Nicholls – vocals (2009)

=== Former members ===
- Michael J. Carrasquillo – live drums and keyboards (2002)
- Melanie Fuher – live vocals (2002)
- Gregg Ziemba – drums (2006–2010)
- Victoria Levy – vocals (2004–2009)
- Mark Durante – guitars (2009, 2011)
- Raymond Watts – vocals (2011, 2016)
- Mona Mur – vocals (2009–2012, 2016)
- Paul Wood – live drums (2011)
- Dan Simoes – live guitars (2012–2015)
- Ethan Moseley – live drums (2012–2016)
- Eric Gottesman – live keyboards (2016)
- Luke Dangler – live guitars (2016)
- Galen Waling – live drums (2016)
- Joshua Lutrell – live keyboards (2017)
- Wulf Del Reno – live drums (2017)

== Discography ==
=== Albums ===
| Album details | Track listing |
|---|---|
| DickNity: Date released: 21 March 2001, re-released 15 October 2002; First studio album; Record label: Itchy Records, re-released by Cleopatra Records | No. / Title / Writer(s) / Length; 1. / "It Won't Do" / En Esch, Günter Schulz, Reiss / 6:07; 2. / "Lazy" / Schulz, Esch, Big B., DJ RoCKSTeADY / 5:05; 3. / "Make Me Believe" / Esch, Schulz, Reiss / 5:21; 4. / "Merci Beaucoup" / Schulz, Esch / 5:01; 5. / "Xcess" / Esch, Schulz, Reiss / 5:59; 6. / "Forgive Me" / Schulz, Esch, Michelle Boback / 7:06; 7. / "Idiot" / Esch, Schulz, Rodriguez / 7:43; 8. / "Get Down – Give In" / Schulz, Esch, Boback, Reiss / 5:22; 9. / "I Feel Fine" / Esch, Schulz / 4:51; 10. / "Blast" / Schulz, Esch, Reiss / 6:16; 11. / "Naomi" / Esch, Schulz / 2:26; Total length: / / / 61:17; Re-release bonus track: No. / Title / Writer(s) / Length; 12. / "Xcess" (Remixed by Christoph Schneider) / Esch, Schulz, Reiss / 4:16; Total length: / / / 65:33 |
| Screwtinized: Date released: 29 October 2004; Second studio album; Record label: Itchy Records | No. / Title / Length; 1. / "Ain't Talkin' 'Bout Love" / 3:54; 2. / "Ogopogo" / 4:17; 3. / "Pulse" / 5:03; 4. / "Wonderful World" / 5:29; 5. / "NY Boogie" / 4:43; 6. / "Get Laid" / 2:50; 7. / "Mind over Matter" / 5:36; 8. / "Merry-Go-Round" / 4:11; 9. / "Halb und Halb" / 1:04; 10. / "Let It Rain" / 7:06; 11. / "Hallelujah" / 4:01; 12. / "Immer Wieder" / 5:08; 13. / "Extra" / 6:40; Total length: / / 60:02 |
| S U C K S E S S: Date released: 4 September 2009; Third studio album; Record label: Itchy Records | No. / Title / Writer(s) / Length; 1. / "Imago" / En Esch / 1:58; 2. / "I.I.W.I.I." (feat. Trixie Reiss) / Günter Schulz, Esch, Dilanjian, Dutton / 5:25; 3. / "Daydreams" / Esch, Schulz, Durante / 4:25; 4. / "Everyone's a Winner" / Errol Brown / 4:20; 5. / "Silly" / Esch, Plumb, Lenihan / 6:59; 6. / "Inshallah" / Esch / 5:21; 7. / "Dipso" / Esch / 5:13; 8. / "Ill Prepared" / Esch, Ziemba, Dilanjian / 6:05; 9. / "Burn for Me" (feat. Hope Nicholls) / Esch, Nicholls, Schulz / 6:11; 10. / "Wer Bist Du?" (feat. Madeline Dutton) / Esch, Ziemba, Dutton / 6:37; 11. / "Last Kiss" / Esch, Diablo? / 4:35; 12. / "Elle Te Prendra La Vie" (feat. Kristen Orb) / Esch, Turiot / 6:45; 13. / "Haller" / Esch / 1:55; 14. / "Hot Stuff" (Hardwire Tekno Vulva Mix) / Esch, Schulz, Gordon, Levy, Dutton / 5:58; 15. / "Die Schabe" (Mona Mur Remix) / Esch, Schulz / 4:50 |

=== Remix albums ===
Album details
Track listing
ReDickUlous
- Date released: 27 May 2003
- First remix album
- Record label: Itchy Records
- Eight tracks are remixes created by fans as part of a remix contest

| No. | Title | Length |
|---|---|---|
| 1. | "Get Down – Give In" (Remixed by Bard Torstensen of Clawfinger) | 5:06 |
| 2. | "It Won't Do" (Surfacex Remix by Terran Westbrook) | 4:47 |
| 3. | "I Feel Fine" (Soft Mix by Dead Combo) | 4:09 |
| 4. | "Lazy" (Horny Refix by En Esch) | 6:14 |
| 5. | "It Won't Do" (Grind Remix by Daniel Schmidt) | 3:42 |
| 6. | "Blast" (Reality Mix by Great Mutant Skywheel) | 4:37 |
| 7. | "Merci Beaucoup" (Merci Beauscrew by Loopy of Hanzel und Gretyl) | 2:32 |
| 8. | "Merci Beaucoup" (Equuleus Remix by Truth) | 4:53 |
| 9. | "Idiot" (Dummkopf Desert Remix by Vas Kallas of Hanzel und Gretyl) | 5:43 |
| 10. | "It Won't Do" (Hart Aber Hertzlich Remix by Pure-X) | 5:17 |
| 11. | "It Won't Do" (Chance's End Remix by Ryan Avery) | 5:24 |
| 12. | "Blast" (Kaldbold Mix by F.Turiot@Kristen.Orb) | 5:00 |
| 13. | "I Feel Fine" (Rodeo Mix by AL 9ER) | 4:30 |
| Total length: | | 61:54 |

xSCREWciating
- Date released: 2006
- Second remix album
- Record label: Itchy Records

| No. | Title | Length |
|---|---|---|
| 1. | "Hot Stuff" | 7:06 |
| 2. | "Let It Rain" (Remixed by B-Audio) | 6:07 |
| 3. | "Mind over Matter" (Remixed by Royce Fay and Gia Ionesco) | 5:19 |
| 4. | "Merry-Go-Round" (Remixed by Gregg Ziemba) | 5:16 |
| 5. | "Get Laid" (Remixed by Gravity Shock vs Fredx) | 3:39 |
| 6. | "Immer Wieder" (Remixed by God Project) | 5:51 |
| 7. | "Hallelujah" (Remixed by More Machine Than Man) | 5:09 |
| 8. | "Mind over Matter" (Remixed by Russell Weiss) | 5:35 |
| 9. | "NY-Boogie" (Remixed by B-Audio) | 4:43 |
| 10. | "Pulse" (Remixed by DJ Fila Flip) | 5:38 |
| 11. | "Wonderful World" (Remixed by Pure-X) | 4:07 |
| 12. | "Extra" (Remixed by Kristen Orb) | 5:07 |
| 13. | "Pulse" (Remixed by Pure-X) | 4:18 |
| 14. | "Wonderful World" (Remixed by B-Audio) | 6:43 |
| Total length: | | 74:44 |

=== Singles ===
- Wien – The Single (2008) – online single
