= Toy Box (EP) =

1991 EP by The Clay People

EP by The Clay People
- Released: 1991
- Studio: Mainframe (Baltimore, Maryland)
- Genre: Industrial metal; alternative metal
- Length: 26:38
- Label: Maltese
- Producer: Alex Eller; George Hagegeorge; Daniel Neet; Peter Porto; Kevin Michael Scott

The Clay People chronology
Toy Box (1991)	Firetribe (1993)

Toy Box is the debut EP of The Clay People, released in 1991 by Maltese Records. It was pivotal in revealing the band's early industrial approach making them staples of the cold wave scene. The song "Nothing" was previously recorded at Arabellum Studios in February 1990 and released on the B-side of The Calling 7" single, which was produced by Art Snay.

== Track listing ==
All tracks are written by Alex Eller, Daniel Neet, Peter Porto and Kevin Michael Scott.

No.	Title	Length
1.	"Nothing"	5:00
2.	"Close My Eye"	2:52
3.	"All From the Inside"	3:36
4.	"Means to an End"	4:21
5.	"Misery"	4:32
6.	"Nothing" (Club Mix)	6:17

== Personnel ==
Adapted from the Toy Box liner notes.

Clay People

- Alex Eller – keyboards, programming, production
- Daniel Neet – lead vocals, production
- Peter Porto – Bass, production
- Kevin Michael Scott – electric guitar, cover concept, production (3)

Production and design

- George Hagegeorge – production, engineering, mixing
- Mark Morgan – cover art, photography

== Release history ==
Region	Date	Label	Format	Catalog
United States	1991	Maltese	CD, LP	CLAY211
