= Rabbit Junk =

American band

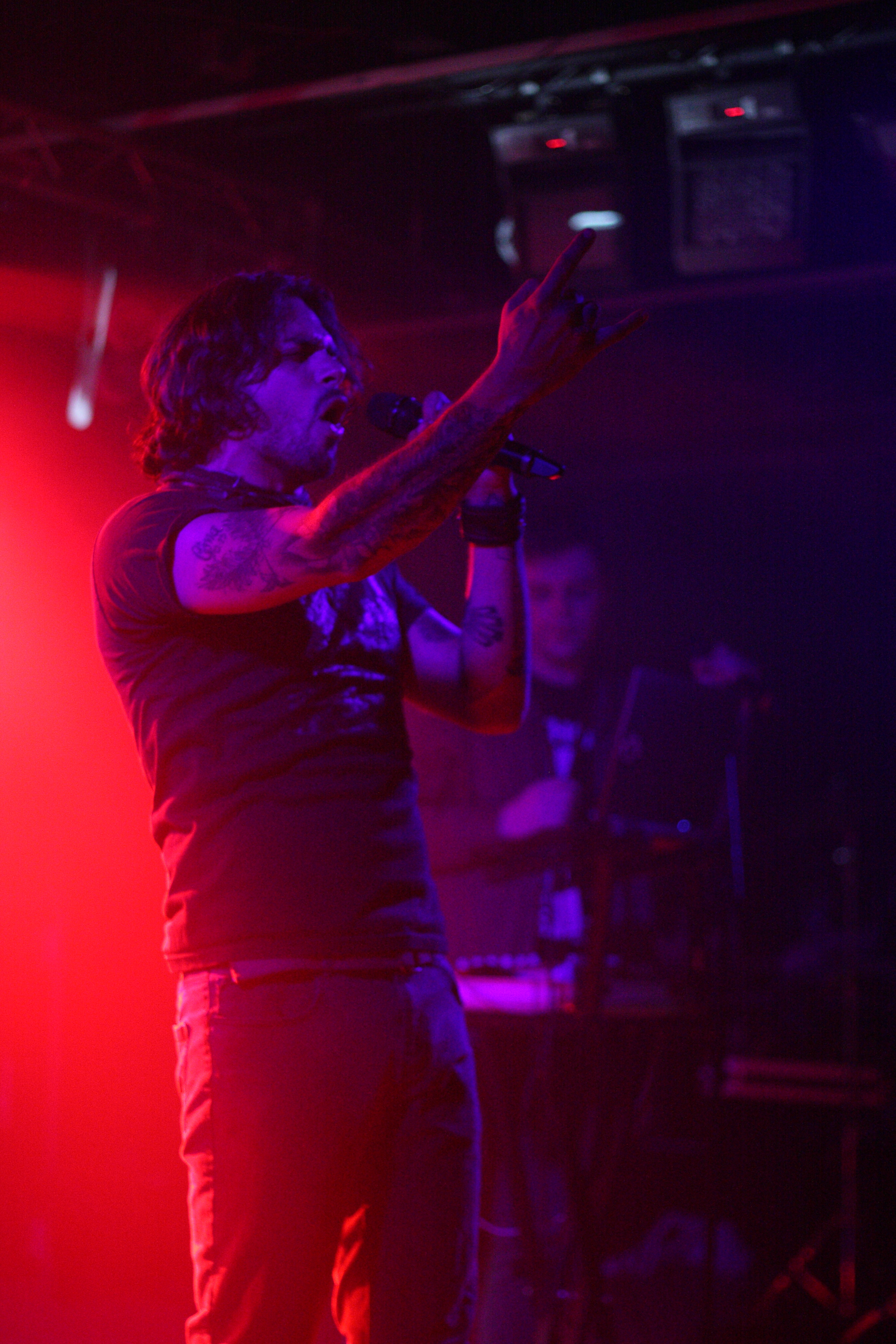
- JP Anderson in 2014

Background information
- Origin: Seattle, Washington, U.S.
- Genres: Digital hardcore; industrial rock; industrial metal; electropunk; electronica; nu metal
- Years active: 2004–present
- Labels: Glitch Mode; Full Effect
- Members: JP Anderson; Jennifer "Sum Grrl" Bernert
- Website: rabbitjunk.bandcamp.com

Rabbit Junk is an American digital hardcore/industrial metal duo made up of JP Anderson, former frontman of the Shizit, and his wife Jennifer "Sum Grrl" Bernert. The band formed in Seattle in 2004 and are currently active in southern California.

After achieving success with their second album Reframe and the release of their fourth album Project Nonagon, Rabbit Junk went on hiatus, but returned in 2014 after positive reception to several promotional singles. They have since released several EPs and three more studio albums, Rabbit Junk Will Die!: Meditations on Mortality (2018), Xenospheres (2020), and Apocalypse for Beginners (2022).

== History ==
=== Formation, self-titled album and REframe (2004–2006) ===
Rabbit Junk started in 2004 after the dissolution of JP Anderson's former band, the Shizit. Anderson asked his wife Jennifer "Sum Grrl" Bernert to provide additional vocals on a demo he was working on, and the duo self-released the demo recordings their debut album Rabbit Junk in 2004. One year later, the band signed to Glitch Mode Recordings and released their second album, REframe, which drew a wider fan base to the band.

A video for the song "In Your Head No One Can Hear You Scream" was produced by the Kandycore Design Company. Guitarists Coleman Thornburg and Dan Gardner, as well as drummer Kent Ames, joined Anderson and Bernert as the duo's touring band in 2006.

After REframe was released, Rabbit Junk contributed the song "Industrial Is Dead" to the Glitch Mode compilation CD Hordes of the Elite. Later, a cover of Atari Teenage Riot's "Start The Riot" appeared on the D-Trash Records Atari Teenage Riot tribute album The Virus Has Been Spread.

=== This Life and Project Nonagon (2007–2010) ===
In October 2007, the first two Rabbit Junk albums were remastered by Tom Baker (who has worked with Marilyn Manson, Nine Inch Nails and the Bloodhound Gang) when the band signed onto Full Effect Records. Rabbit Junk's third album, This Life Is Where You Get Fucked, was released on April 28, 2008. This Life is divided into three separate three-song suites, exploring different themes and genres within each.

In September 2008, Rabbit Junk released three new songs on their MySpace page for download, titled "Power", "Blood" and "Home", forming the first part of their follow-up to This Life, Project Nonagon – another album divided into three separate parts, all of which act as sequels to the three parts of their previous release. The band released the next three songs in 2009, and the final three were released on the full album in 2010.

After the release of Project Nonagon, Rabbit Junk cut ties with Full Effect Records. Anderson would later state that he felt "isolated" by the label's control over Rabbit Junk's image and interaction with fans, but didn't believe that the label did anything intentionally malicious.

=== "The Lost Years" (2011–2013) ===
After the band's departure from Full Effect Records, Anderson focused his efforts on various side projects throughout 2009 including steampunk-inspired Fighting Ice With Iron, folk metal Wolves Under Sail, and a revival of his old band the Shizit, later rebranded as the Named due to contract disputes with his former bandmembers. From 2011 to 2013, Rabbit Junk released a series of singles which Anderson claims were keeping the project "on life support" after the experiences with Full Effect. After the release of "Break Shins to This" in 2013, and the positive feedback that followed, Anderson decided to move Rabbit Junk's music into a more electronic direction. The band released "From the Ashes" (which contained a sampled riff from "Dead Embryonic Cells" by Sepultura) on a 2013 Christmas sampler by Glitch Mode Recordings, who have distributed all of Rabbit Junk's releases since. The success of these singles led to a 2016 compilation of remastered songs entitled Singles from the Lost Years 2011–2013.

=== Pop That Pretty Thirty and EPs (2014–2016) ===
Rabbit Junk released a new EP in 2014, titled Pop That Pretty Thirty, shortly followed by their first live EP, Live 2014. In January 2015 the band released the Invasion EP, with Anderson has since stating in interviews that Rabbit Junk will no longer release full-length albums and will only release extended plays, aiming for two per year, as it allows for more creative freedom and not being confined to fixed concepts.

Rabbit Junk released Beast on October 28, 2015. On February 9, 2016, the band released "Singles from the Lost Years 2011–2013", which contained remastered and alternate versions of all the singles that were released in between Project Nonagon and Pop That Pretty Thirty.

=== Rabbit Junk Will Die: Meditations on Mortality, Xenospheres, and Apocalypse for Beginners (2017–present) ===
Like the Flesh Does the Knife, an EP of remixes from Beast, Invasion, and Pop That Pretty Thirty, was released in 2017. Rabbit Junk officially announced the release of their "comeback" album, Rabbit Junk Will Die: Meditations on Mortality, in late 2017, and released it January 2018 following the singles "Gravity Hero" and "Become Hell".

In July 2019, Rabbit Junk confirmed that they had re-obtained the rights to their pre-2011 recordings and would be re-releasing the original albums Rabbit Junk, Reframe, This Life Is Where You Get Fucked, and Project Nonagon through Bandcamp with new original artwork by frequent collaborator Andrew Tremblay, and proceeded to release them over the next few months, alongside their newly recorded Reveal EP. In December of that year, Anderson announced another album with a tentative release date for 2020, later titling it Xenospheres. The first single "Bits & Razors" was released in April 2020 and was followed by "Prismatic" in July; the album was released to Bandcamp and streaming in late 2020.

After releasing the singles "Reckoning" and "Attendance", Anderson and Bernert relocated to southern California in 2021 after Anderson received his Ph.D. The band recorded and released the single "Denature" in their new studio space in late 2021. Anderson announced the band's forthcoming seventh album Apocalypse for Beginners in early 2022, teasing the release for later that year with the singles "Pathogenesis", "The Grind", and "Bodies".

Since 2021 JP Anderson is an assistant professor at San Diego State University. He graduated with a Ph.D. at the University of Washington.

Apocalypse for Beginners was released on October 21, 2022, and featured 9 tracks, including a feature with Amelia Arsenic. The album was completely independently produced, with JP having recorded, mixed and mastered all the tracks, with Sum Grrl being responsible for vocals on some of the tracks. The album art is a play on "90's how to manuals" and was made by The Iron Parasite. 3 of the album's songs (Bodies, Love Is Hell and The Grind) had been previously released as singles.

== Members ==
- JP Anderson – vocals, guitars, bass, drums, keyboards, programming
- Jennifer "Sum Grrl" Bernert – vocals, keyboards

Live band

- Amelia Arsenic – keyboards, electronics, vocals (2018)
- Coleman Thornburg – guitars (2006–2011)
- Dan Gardner – guitars (2006–2011)
- Kent Ames – drums (2006–2015)

== Discography ==
Studio albums

- Rabbit Junk (2004, remastered 2008, re-released 2019)
- Reframe (2006, remastered 2008, re-released 2019)
- This Life Is Where You Get Fucked (2008, re-released 2019)
- Project Nonagon (2010, re-released 2019)
- Rabbit Junk Will Die: Meditations On Mortality (2018)
- Xenospheres (2020)
- Apocalypse For Beginners (2022)

Compilations

- Singles from the Lost Years 2011–2013 (2016)
- Consolidate (2016)
- Deep Cuts (2026)

Remix albums

- Modified Mortality (2018)

Extended plays

- Hare Brained: The Remixes (Unofficial release) (2005)
- Project Nonagon: The Struggle II (2008)
- Drek Kick: Cyanotic vs Rabbit Junk (2009)
- Project Nonagon: Ghetto Blasphemer II – From the Stars (2009, reissued 2016)
- Pop That Pretty Thirty (2014)
- Invasion (2015)
- Beast (2015)
- Like the Flesh Does the Knife (Remix EP) (2017)
- Reveal (Extended) (2019)

Live extended plays

- Live 2014

Singles / Others

- "Industrial Is Dead" (2006, remastered 2021)
- "Start the Riot'"(2007)
- "What Doesn't Kill You Will Make You a Killer" (2011)
- "Lucid Summations" (2011)
- "Bubble" (2012)
- "Boy with the Sun in His Eyes" (2012)
- "Own Up" (2012)
- "Break Shins to This" (2013)
- "From the Ashes" (2013)
- "T Minus Everything" (2018)
- "Zero (Smashing Pumpkins Cover)" (2019)
- "We Saw the End" (2019)
- "Bits and Razors" (2020)
- "Prismatic" (2020)
- "Reckoning" (2021)
- "Attendance" (2021)
- "Denature" (2021)
- "Pathogenesis" (2022)
- "The Grind" (2022)
- "Bodies" (2022)
- "Love is Hell" (2022)
- "Fight me, Erebus" (2023)
- "Wrath of Viridis" (2024)
- "Splendid Chains" (2024)
- "Indoor Kids" (2025)
