= En Esch =

German musician

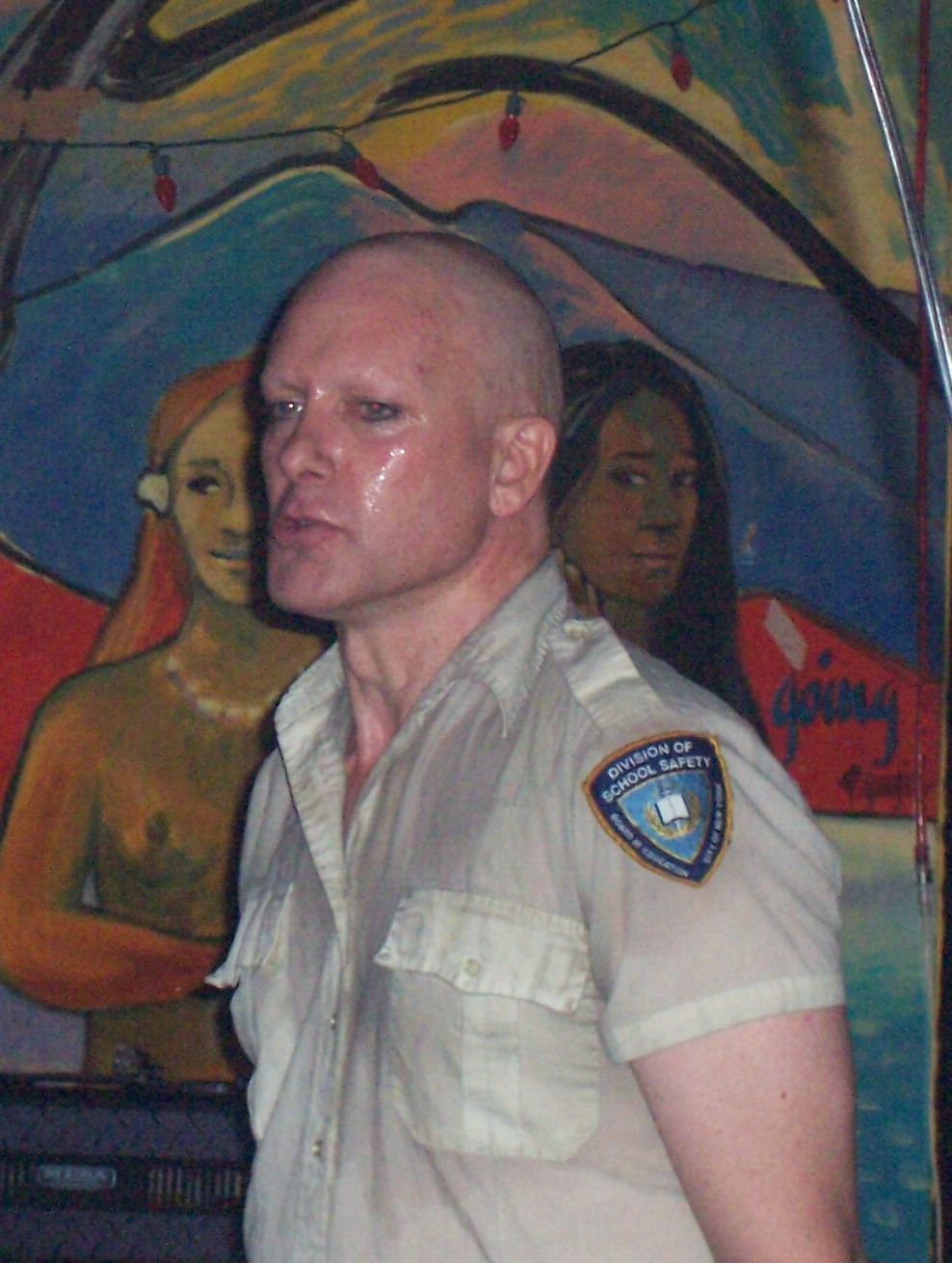
- En Esch, 2005

Background information
- Also known as: Klaus Schandelmaier, Nick
- Born: Nicklaus Schandelmaier; 23 March 1968 (age 58)
- Genres: Industrial rock; electro-industrial; industrial music
- Occupation: Musician
- Instruments: Vocals; percussion; drums; guitar
- Label: Give/Take
- Formerly of: KMFDM; Pigface; Slick Idiot; Mona Mur; <PIG>

Nicklaus Schandelmaier (born 23 March 1968), better known by his stage name En Esch, is a German musician and has been a member of the bands KMFDM, Pigface, Slick Idiot, and <PIG>.

== History ==
En Esch, born near Frankfurt, is an orchestra percussionist, drummer, programmer, producer, sound mixer, guitarist and singer. He was a member of the German industrial rock group, KMFDM, from 1985 to 1999, during which time he contributed to ten studio albums and more than a dozen singles as musician, composer and producer.

Sascha Konietzko claims to have given Esch his nickname because the latter felt that his real name was inappropriate for the stage. It is derived from the German pronunciation of his initials (N. Sch.). Esch lived in Germany until 1992, when he moved to Chicago to join Konietzko, who had moved there a year earlier.

It was at this time that Esch first worked with Pigface, whom he also toured with in the early 1990s. This would be the first time Esch "left" KMFDM and Sascha would proclaim Money as their last album together. After moving to New Orleans he released a solo album, Cheesy, in 1993. While Konietzko eventually relocated to Seattle, WA, Esch would adhere to his nomadic ways and eventually wind up in NYC in the mid to late 90's. Esch would also "leave the band" in 1996 resulting in minimal output into the album Xtort, although Sascha did not proclaim the band "done" this time, not until 1999's poignantly titled Adios. Esch would not return when KMFDM "reformed" in 2002 and has not appeared on any albums post-Adios.

When KMFDM broke up in 1999, Esch briefly worked with the band Pizza Whore, which changed its name to Barely Legal, and included Trixie Reiss of The Crystal Method. The band did not last, and Esch began traveling to Canada to visit Günter Schulz, the former KMFDM guitarist. They formed Slick Idiot, and released their first album in 2001. They have released two more albums under that moniker since then.

Esch has since begun working actively with Pigface again, joining them on tour in 2005.

Esch was rumored to be the replacement lead singer of industrial group Rammstein, but this turned out to be a hoax.

In 2007, he began collaborating with fellow German musician Mona Mur. The two released the album 120 Tage in February 2009, and toured together in support of the release over the next two years. Esch and Mur joined Schulz, Raymond Watts, and Mark Durante to perform at the Wax Trax! Retrospectacle in Chicago, a charity event celebrating the industrial music label, and performed KMFDM songs from the 1990s. A second album by the duo of Esch and Mur was released in 2011.

A second solo album, Spänk, was successfully crowdfunded and released in late 2014. His third solo album, Trash Chic, was originally scheduled for release on 31 May 2016, but was postponed to 1 July. Esch would hit the road in support of Trash Chic, opening for, and playing guitar, in <PIG>'s live band, alongside former Slick Idiot guitarist Guenter Shulz.

== Personal life ==
Esch is a vegetarian and an animal rights activist. He currently resides in Berlin.

== Partial discography ==
=== Solo ===
- Cheesy (1993)
- Confidence (single) (1993)
- Spänk (2014)
- Trash Chic (2016)
- Et Nos Unum Sumus (2023)
- Dance Hall Putsch (2024)

=== Slick Idiot ===
- DickNity (2001)
- ReDickUlous (2003)
- Screwtinized (2004)
- Xscrewciating (2006)
- Sucksess (2009)

=== with Jost Band ===
- W.A.S.A. (We Are Still Alive) (1980)

=== with Pigface ===
- Gub (1990)
- Welcome to Mexico... Asshole (1991)
- Fook (1992)
- Washingmachine Mouth (1992)
- Truth Will Out (1993)
- Easy Listening... (2003)
- 6 (2009)

=== with Mona Mur ===
- 120 Tage - The Fine Art of Beauty and Violence (2009)
- Do With Me What You Want (2011)

=== with FM Einheit and Mona Mur ===
- Terre Haute (2013)

=== with <PIG> ===
- The Gospel (2016)
- Risen (2018)
- Pain Is God (2020)
- Red Room (2024)
