= Names (disambiguation) =

Names are words or terms used for identification.

Names may also refer to:

- Names (EP), by Johnny Foreigner
- Names (journal), an academic journal of onomastics
- The Names (band), a Belgian post-punk band
- The Names (DeLillo novel), by Don DeLillo
- The Names (Knapp novel), a 2025 novel by Florence Knapp
- Names Hill, a bluff on the Green River in Wyoming, US
- "Names", a song by Cat Power from You Are Free

== See also ==
- The infernal names, biblical anti-figures in LaVeyan Satanism
- Name (disambiguation)
