= Naming =

Naming is assigning a name to something.

Naming may refer to:

- Naming (parliamentary procedure), a procedure in certain parliamentary bodies
- Naming ceremony, an event at which an infant is named
- Product naming, the discipline of deciding what a product will be called

== See also ==
- Name (disambiguation)
- Nomenclature
