= Unbound Saga =

2009 video game

- Developer: Vogster Entertainment
- Publisher: Vogster Entertainment
- Platforms: PlayStation Portable, Xbox 360
- Release: PSP: NA: July 16, 2009; Xbox 360: NA: December 1, 2010
- Genre: Beat 'em up
- Modes: Single-player, Multiplayer

Unbound Saga is a 2.5D side-scrolling beat 'em up video game developed and published by Vogster Entertainment and also a one-shot comic book published by Dark Horse Comics. It was released July 16, 2009 for the PlayStation Portable via the PlayStation Network, and on December 1, 2010, for the Xbox 360 via Xbox Live Arcade.

Unbound Saga is the story of Rick Ajax, a comic book character who is aware he is in a comic. Ajax and fellow comic character Lori Machete seek to confront the artist who created them and be freed from constantly fighting.

The game received moderate reviews from critics, with the PlayStation Portable version averaging 52.60% at GameRankings and 56/100 at Metacritic. Reviewers felt that the art direction was well done, with several reviewers praising the cutscenes, along with the voice acting. Some reviewers said the combat was unpolished, and that the upgrade system lacked depth. Others lauded the simplicity of combat, likening it to classic beat 'em up titles.

== Gameplay ==
Unbound Saga takes place inside a comic book and follows Rick Ajax, a character aware of being in a comic, and determined to confront his maker.

Unbound Saga is a 2.5D side-scrolling beat 'em up game. The game is played as though the character is reading a comic book. In individual comic panels, the player character fights off enemies using a combination of three attacks, which can be chained together in combos. When a character is defeated, the hand of The Maker appears and draws additional enemies. In order to complete a panel, the player must defeat all the enemies The Maker draws. As a panel is completed, the character jumps to the next one, similar to Comix Zone. The environment locales vary and include areas like sewers, city slums, jungles and tundra.

Each of the two playable characters has a unique animation set and fighting style. Rick uses a fighting style similar to wrestling and can also pick up and throw enemies. Lori's moveset is more reminiscent of kung fu, and she has the ability to use smoke pellets to sneak up on enemies. Character moves and abilities can be upgraded to gain more powerful attacks. Two players can team up to complete the game on the Xbox 360, each taking a respective character. Objects can also be picked up and thrown. These objects decay into smaller objects after each use.

== Plot ==
The game follows Rick Ajax, a bartending comic book character aware of the fact that he is in a comic. He knows of his creator, whom he refers to as The Maker. A second character, Lori Machete, is also available. They journey together through the fictional city of Toxopolis to confront The Maker.

== Development and promotion ==
Unbound Saga was first announced by Vogster Entertainment for the PlayStation Portable at New York Comic Con 2009. It was released on July 16, 2009. On April 23, 2010, Vogster announced that the game was being ported to the Xbox 360. The port was announced to have cooperative gameplay, a feature absent from the PSP version. It was subsequently released on Xbox Live Arcade on December 1, 2010. In an interview with Mike Kennedy from Vogster Entertainment, Kennedy said the game was influenced by Final Fight and Streets of Rage.

The art for the in-game cutscenes was done by Cliff Richards. A one-shot comic book was also created and published by Dark Horse Comics in conjunction with the game. Richards also created all of the art for the comic book. Mike Kennedy stated in an interview at St. Louis Comic-Con 2009 that the game and the comic had always been developed as one, rather than one being an adaptation of the other. The comic was launched on July 1, 2009. Limited edition figurines were also created to promote the game and comic book launch.

== Reception ==
Unbound Saga

Aggregate scores
| Aggregator | Score |
|---|---|
| GameRankings | 52.60% (PSP); 55.86% (X360) |
| Metacritic | 56/100 (PSP); 52/100 (X360) |

Review scores
| Publication | Score |
|---|---|
| Destructoid | 7.5/10 |
| GameSpot | 4/10 |
| IGN | 5.8/10 |
| Official U.S. PlayStation Magazine | 3.5/5 |

Unbound Saga received mixed reviews from critics. The game holds a score of 52.60% for the PSP at GameRankings and 56/100 for the PSP at Metacritic. GameRankings and Metacritic report similar numbers for the Xbox 360 version, with aggregate scores of 55.86% and 52/100, respectively. Scores across both versions ranged from a 30% approval rating from Kristan Reed of Eurogamer to a 75% approval rating from James Stephanie Sterling and Nick Chester of Destructoid. The Xbox 360 version moved over 3,900 units during the month of its release. It moved roughly 28,000 units as of the end of 2011.

Reviewers had mixed views on Unbound Saga's gameplay. The reviewer from Spazio Games, an Italian gaming site, compared the game to Double Dragon and Final Fight. The reviewer felt that the game seemed rushed, and this affected gameplay. Carolyn Petit of GameSpot was more critical of the game, calling it "dull" and "mindless. IGN's Greg Miller noted the inclusion of combos and upgradeable character statistics, but felt that they "never really amplify the fun in alternating between punch and kick." Destructoid's James Stephanie Sterling noted "While there are more complex combos to unlock during the course of the game, the meat and potatoes of Unbound Saga is the endless hammering buttons to punch, kick and throw enemies around each level." Co-reviewer Nick Chester called it "classic beat-’em-up game". Although giving the simple gameplay high marks, Chester felt that the PSP version should have received cooperative play. Mike Jackson of GamesRadar appreciated the addition of cooperative gameplay on the Xbox 360 version, but wished players could join or leave at will.

Critics were universal in praising the comic book art and voice acting present in the cutscenes. The reviewer from Spazio Games felt the cutscenes were well crafted and professionally done. GameSpot's Carolyn Petit stated that the "cutscenes are the game's high point and feature gorgeous comic-book artwork", and added "the voice actors do a fine job". Destructoid's James Stephanie Sterling called the visuals "gritty comic book feel that doesn't look obtusely cel-shaded" and added "the voice talent is damn good as well". Nick Chester agreed with his co-reviewer and added "without a doubt, the game’s animated comics-brought-to-life cut-scenes are absolutely marvelous." GamesRadar's Mike Jackson enjoyed the character's one-liners. He stated it was "pretty amusing with a tinge of adult humor." He also felt that the plot was well written, the characters were instantly likable, and the game had a "great comic book style". Brian Rowe of GameZone was surprisingly pleased with the soundtrack, and called it "unusually cool".
