= The Shizit =

American band

- Origin: Seattle, Washington, U.S.
- Genres: Digital hardcore; industrial metal; nu metal
- Years active: 1999–2003
- Labels: D-Trash, E115, MP3.com
- Members: J.P. Anderson; Brian Shrader; Jason Alberts

The Shizit was an American digital hardcore band from Seattle, Washington, initially formed by J.P. Anderson and Brian Shrader in early 1999. The music was an intense mix of gabber, breakbeat, drum and bass, hardcore techno, hardcore and heavy metal guitars, amped up with aggressive political lyrics. The band released two CDs on mp3.com, and as it was spread quickly among underground sources, the band steadily built up their following. In 2001, they began work on their third album, Soundtrack for the Revolution; The album was finally released at E115 Records, a Canadian indie label later that year, and tracks from it were released on Alec Empire's "Don't Fuck With US" compilation. The band also joined Alec on his European tour, and the band added turntablist Jason Alberts. In 2003, the band announced they were disbanding due to personal disputes between Anderson and Shrader. A posthumous album was released on D-Trash Records, with artists remixing the Soundtrack for the Revolution album as Remixed for the Revolution.

Anderson is currently working with his musical project Rabbit Junk. He also released a self-titled album under the name The Shizit in 2009 in a breach of contract with Shrader, but after being requested to cease and desist, the project was retitled to The Named.

== Members ==
- J.P. Anderson – lead vocals, rhythm guitar, programming (1999–2003)
- Brian Shrader – lead guitar, backing vocals, samples (1999–2003)
- Jason Alberts – turntables (2003)

== Discography ==
- Evil Inside (1999, MP3.com)
- Script Kiddie (2000, MP3.com)
- Soundtrack for the Revolution (2001, E115) (a.k.a. SoFTeR)
- Remixed for the Revolution (2004, D-Trash)
- Live at Club Spirit (2008, D-Trash)
- The Shizit (2009, D-Trash) (later reissued as The Named in 2010)
