= The Iron Icon =

1995 EP by The Clay People

EP by Clay People
- Released: August 1995
- Studio: Track in the Box (Baltimore, MD)
- Genre: Industrial metal, alternative metal
- Length: 27:54
- Label: Re-Constriction
- Producer: Van Christie, Daniel Neet, Adam Yoffe

Clay People chronology
Firetribe (1993)	The Iron Icon (1995)	Cringe (1995)

The Iron Icon is the second EP by The Clay People, released in August 1995 by record label Re-Constriction Records.

== Packaging ==
The Japanese porcelain artwork was chosen by Re-Constriction Records label owner Chase.

== Reception ==
Professional ratings
Review scores
Source	Rating
AllMusic	4/5 stars

Jason Anderson of allmusic gave The Iron Icon four out of five stars, calling the music "extremely loud and abusive industrial noise" and "repetitive in sonic texture, lyrical concept, and also in its bludgeoning tone." Aiding & Abetting gave the album a positive review and praised the band's change in artistic direction towards a more heavy metal sound. Sonic Boom credited Daniel Neet's vocals and the album's unique vocal mix as being among the highpoints of the album.

== Track listing ==
All tracks are written by Alex Eller, Brian McGarvey, Daniel Neet and Will Nivens.

No.	Title	Length
1.	"Lethargic"	3:59
2.	"We Are All Sick"	4:31
3.	"Palegod"	3:57
4.	"Victims"	3:47
5.	"Rusted Iron Turning Wheel"	5:41
6.	"Spit"	5:59

== Personnel ==
Adapted from The Iron Icon liner notes.

Clay People

- Alex Eller – keyboards, programming, pre-production
- Brian McGarvey – electric guitar
- Daniel Neet – lead vocals, production
- Will Nivens – drums

Production and design

- Duane Beer – loops, sampler
- Burton C. Bell – backing vocals
- Chase – design
- Van Christie – production
- James Galas – design
- Jason McNinch – production
- Jeff Motch – design
- Mud – sampler, mastering
- Will Nivens – production
- Steven – sampler
- Alex Welz – backing vocals
- Adam Yoffe – production, pre-production

== Release history ==
Region	Date	Label	Format	Catalog
United States	1995	Re-Constriction	CD	REC-015
