= DJ? Acucrack =

Electronic music duo

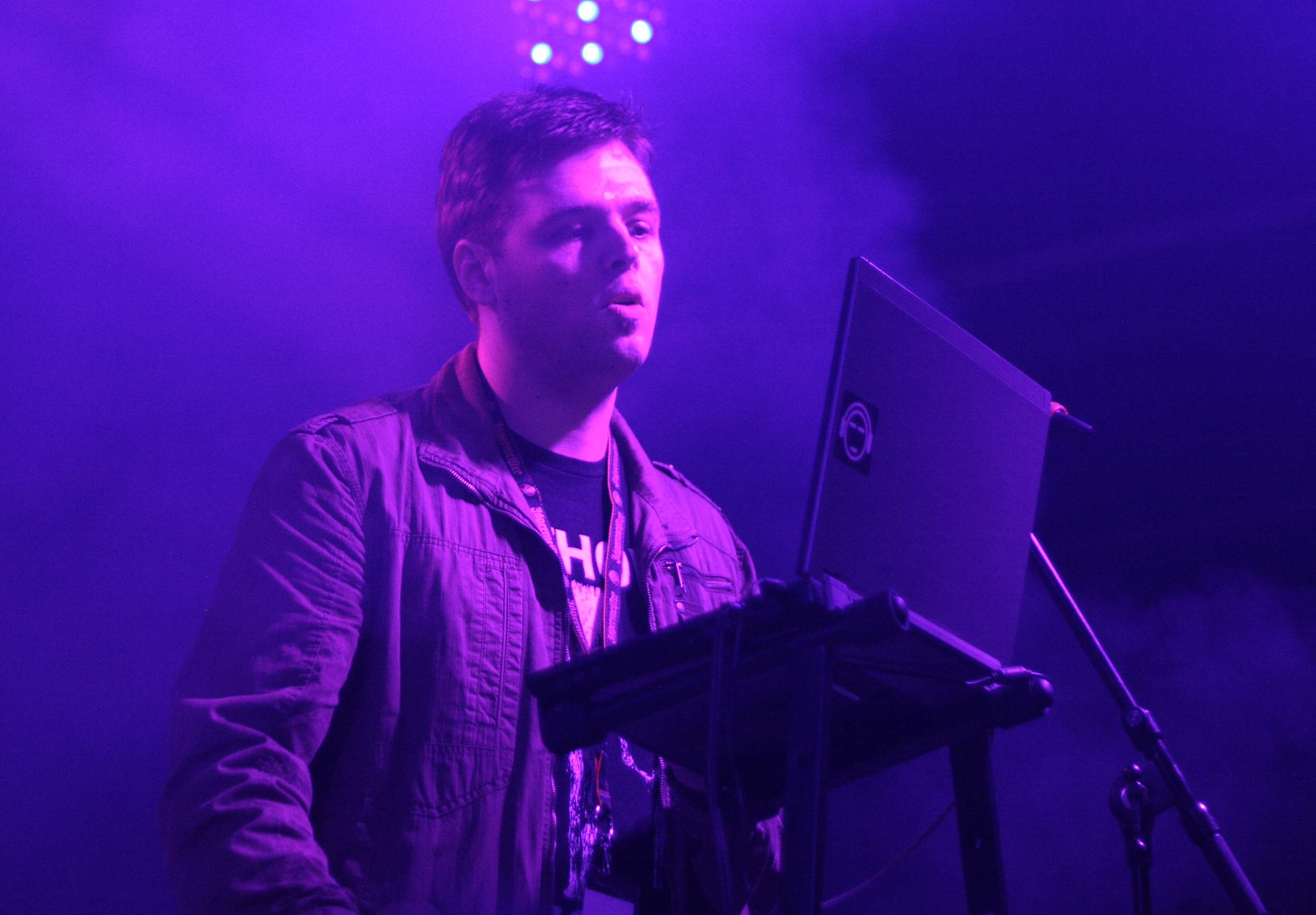
- At Infest 2014

Background information
- Origin: Chicago, Illinois, U.S.
- Genre: Drum n' Bass
- Years active: c. 1997–2014
- Past members: Jason Novak; Jamie Duffy

DJ? Acucrack is an electronic music duo based in Chicago, Illinois. DJ? Acucrack was formed by Jason Novak and Jamie Duffy as an Acumen Nation drum n' bass side project. The duo initially created the side project to "kill time" between releases for Acumen Nation, but their releases as Acucrack were so well received that the side project ended up taking precedence. Their first two releases — Nation State and Mutants of Sound — appeared on the CMJ RPM year end charts for 1998.

Their 2000 album, Sorted, peaked at #2 on the CMJ RPM Charts in the U.S. In 2004, DJ? Acucrack opened for KMFDM on their 20th Anniversary Tour.

In August 2005, DJ? Acucrack released a new album, Killing Mobius. In 2006, they toured with Front Line Assembly for their Artificial Soldier tour, which was cut short. Issues with the tour bus company have been cited for the cancellation.

Founding member Jamie Duffy died on June 21, 2012.

== Discography ==
- Nation State EP (1997)
- Mutants of Sound (1998)
- The Mutants Are Coming and I Believe They Are of Sound (2000)
- Sorted (2000)
- So to Speak (2000)
- The Dope King (2002)
- Mako Vs. Geist (2004)
- Killing Mobius (2005)
- Humanoids From The Deep (2007)
- The Mawn Reproduction (2013)

== Extra ==
"So to Speak" was featured in the episode "Hard-Hearted Hannah" of True Blood (Season 2, Episode 6).

They also have made a remix album of Pigface called Crackhead and have helped produce Chemlab's album Oxidizer.

Additionally, their remix of "Mercury" appeared on Voivod's 1998 compilation album Kronik.
