= Cyanotic (band) =

American industrial rock/metal band

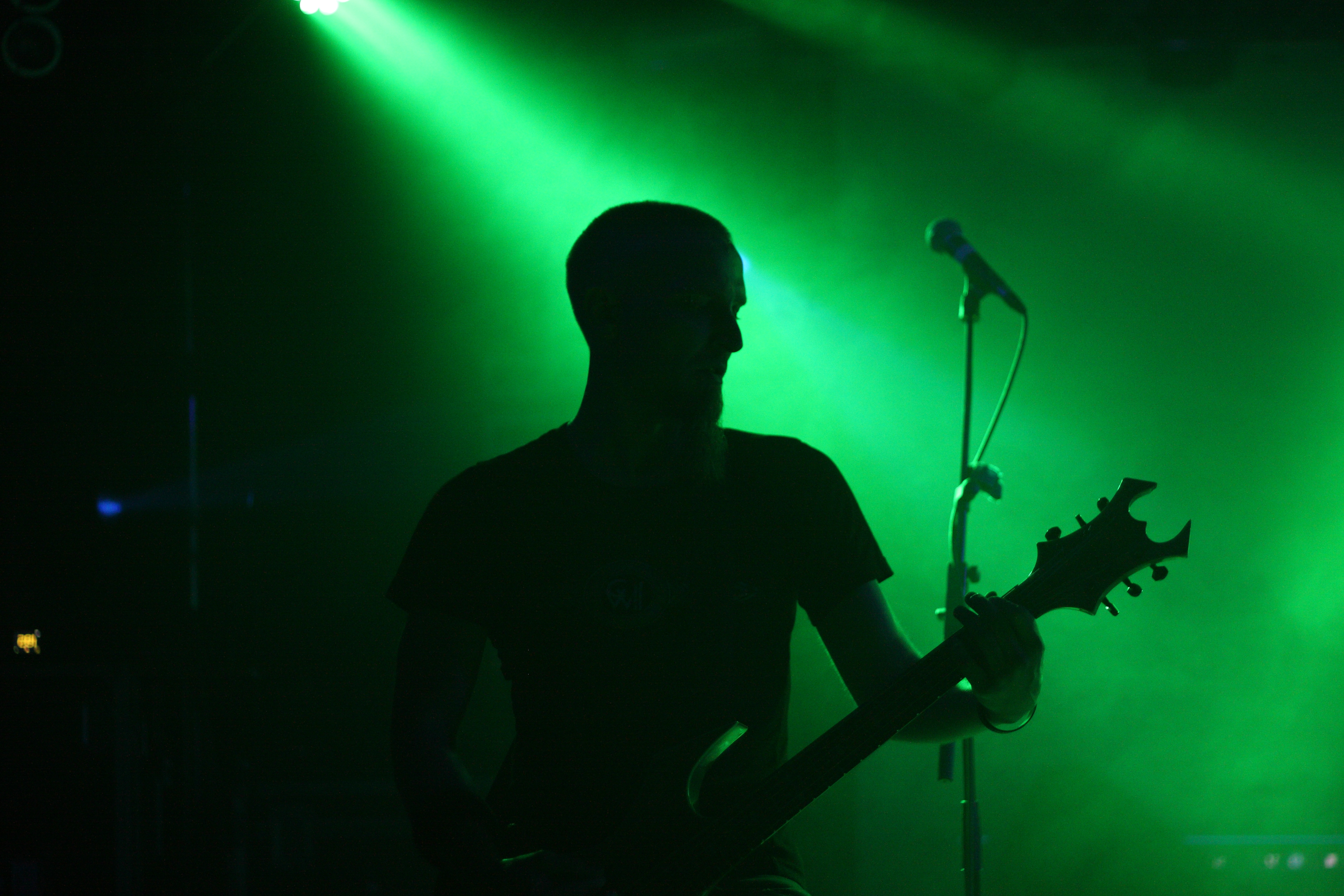
- Cyanotic in 2014

Background information
- Origin: Chicago, Illinois, U.S.
- Genres: Industrial rock, industrial metal, EBM, coldwave
- Years active: 2002–present
- Labels: Glitch Mode Recordings, Bit Riot Records
- Members: Sean Payne; Tal "Talon" Kliger; Jesse Hunt
- Past members: Chris H-Ski; Drew Rosander; Kevin Barron
- Website: cyanotic.net

Cyanotic is a Chicago-based industrial rock collective fronted by Sean Payne that formed in 2002 and released its first full-length album in 2005. Cyanotic is known for its genre-blending work, which fuses traditional industrial beats and vocals with drum n bass, sampling and heavy metal to create a hard, aggressive sound. The band's lyrics contain many tongue-in-cheek references to transhumanism.

== History ==
Fronted by Sean Payne, the project has appeared throughout North America and the United Kingdom live with the likes of Skinny Puppy, Front Line Assembly, The Dillinger Escape Plan, Meat Beat Manifesto, Chemlab, 16 Volt, Andrew W.K., Acumen Nation, DJ? Acucrack, Rabbit Junk and many more.

Sean Payne formed Cyanotic in 2002 and released the Mutual Bonding Through Violation demo EP in 2003 via their own Glitch Mode Recordings label. Transhuman was released in mid-2005, and was Cyanotic's first full-length album, featuring 12 tracks and co-production by Jason Novak of Acumen Nation / DJ? Acucrack. A two-disc deluxe edition, Transhuman 2.0, and the "Hail the Glitch 2k6" summer tour followed soon after. The double album features the original Transhuman, digitally remastered by Chris Cozort of iammynewt, as well a second disc featuring new songs, alternate mixes, bonus tracks and guest appearances from members of Front Line Assembly, 16 Volt, Acumen Nation, DJ? Acucrack, mindfluxFuneral and fellow Glitch Mode Recordings cohorts Rabbit Junk. Transhuman 2.0 saw its release via WTII Records and BitRiot Records in association with

The band's second full-length album, The Medication Generation saw release in summer 2010. Musically, the band continued to mature, and the partnership for co-producing with Acumen Nation's Jamie Duffy saw the band's song-writing and production improve. Since the release of The Medication Generation, Cyanotic has toured the United States multiple times in support of the release.

Cyanotic had done remixes and production work for several artists, including Chemlab, Front Line Assembly, 16 Volt, Acumen Nation, Pigface, 3Teeth, Author & Punisher. Sean Payne stayed active in producing Cyanotic, doing production work for others and maintaining multiple collaborations. Robohop saw Cyanotic and members of The Glitch Mode Squad collaborating with Chicago drill / hip hop artists to create a rough, glitchy and gritty industrial – hip hop release. "Prime Directives, 1-4" was met with positive reception, both within the Chicago hip-hop community and industrial scene.

"Worst Case Scenario", released September 9, 2014, was the band's final release with guitarist, Chris H, as well as co-producer Jamie Duffy following his death in July 2012. The band continued to rotate a live and studio secondary role during this time. Cyanotic performed live at The Cold Waves music festival in 2012, in honor of Jamie Duffy and has since reappeared twice (2014, 2017). Worst Case Scenario, vol. 1 was met with positive reviews for its continued path through various industrial influences.

In 2016, Cyanotic and guitarist Chris H separated, but a live act of Jordan Davis (Relic) on synthesizers, Dan Dickerscheid (Relic) on drums and Kevin Barron transitioning from live and studio synthesizer player to bass continued to perform live without guitars. The band completed a North American tour with iVardensphere, and performances with Tim Skold (KMFDM, Marilyn Manson) as a four piece. This heavily influenced the fourth studio album, Tech Noir. Audiences found immediate differences in Tech Noir for its almost complete lack of guitars, but the album received critical praise for its ability to communicate aggression without requiring guitars to do so. Tech Noir was re-released in 2018 with seven new tracks as T2.

During the band's history, Payne has created multiple remixes for bands and artists including Circle of Dust, Seep Away and more.

In 2019, Sean Payne was joined in-studio and on stage by Glitch Mode Recordings label mates CONFORMCO drummer Jesse Hunt and Nuclear*Sun's Tal Kliger on guitar and synths.

On May 12, 2022, Drew Rosander died from an apparent suicide by overdose, aged 37.

== Line-up ==
=== Studio ===
- Sean Payne – vocals, electronics (2002–present)
- Brad Huston – guitars, additional electronics (2019–present)
- Jesse Hunt – drums (2019–present)
- Connor Eck – bass, additional synths (2019–present)

=== Live ===
- Sean Payne: vocals, programming
- Brad Huston: guitars, additional synths
- Jesse Hunt: drums, additional percussion
- Connor Eck: synth
- David Kultgen: visuals/projection

=== Former & sessional ===
- Drew Rosander – guitars, synths (2002–2010, 2014, 2017)
- Chris Hryniewiecki – guitars (2005–2015)
- Kevin Barron – live bass, production/programming (2010–2019)
- Jordan Davis – live electronics, vocals (2012–present)
- Dan Dickerscheid – live drums (2016–present)
- Brian Blake – bass (2002–2007)
- Jairus Khan – additional programming (2005–2007)
- Tom Hutchinson – live synths (2005–2007)
- Ondrea Clarkson – live synths (2008)
- G. Benjamin Ensor – bass (2010)
- Michael Wert – live drums (2011)
- Benn 'tranQ' Guy – synths, percussion (2011)
- Phil DiSiena – additional synths, programming (2008–2011)
- Paul Wood – live drums (2012–2016)
- Armando Terrazas – additional programming (2013)
- Brandon Philipson – guitars (2013)
- ToneZone Beatz – additional programming (2013)
- Jason Prost – live drums/production
- Anthony Smith – live synth
- Eris – live drums
- Tal Kliger – guitars/live guitars/live synths (2019)
- Charles Levi – bass (2019)

== Discography ==
=== Albums ===
- 2005 Transhuman (Glitch Mode)
- 2007 Transhuman 2.0 (Bit Riot Records / WTII Records / Glitch Mode)
- 2010 The Medication Generation (Bit Riot Records / WTII Records / Glitch Mode)
- 2014 Worst Case Scenario: Vol. 1 (Glitch Mode)
- 2015 Worst Case Scenario: Vol. 2 (Glitch Mode)
- 2017 Tech Noir (Glitch Mode)
- 2018 T2 (Armalyte Industries / Glitch Mode)
- 2019 Trigger Effect (Glitch Mode)
- 2023 The After Effect

=== EPs ===
- 2003 Mutual Bonding Through Violation (Glitch Mode)
- 2006 Cyanotic vs Ad·ver·sary – Music for Jerks (Glitch Mode)
- 2008 Prehab 25mg-EP (Bit Riot Records / WTII / Glitch Mode)
- 2009 Cyanotic vs Rabbit Junk – Drek Kick (Bit Riot Records / WTII / Glitch Mode)
- 2012 MedPack Vol. 1 (Glitch Mode)
- 202? MedPack Vol. 2 (Glitch Mode)

=== Remixes/Collaborations ===
- 2004 Acumen Nation – Artifacts: 1990–1993 (Glitch Mode Squad Mix)
- 2004 Various Artists – Remixwars- Art Of War: Conquer Vol 1.1 Pti – Sleepless (Cyanotic Driveby Remix)
- 2005 The Aggression – Revisionist History – One Million Nights (Glitch Mode Remix)
- 2005 Various Artists – Darksonus Vol. 1
- 2005 Various Artists – Modern Destruction
- 2006 Chemlab – Rock Whore vs. Dance Floor – Atomic Automatic (Our Glitch Mode Squad is Dangerous Mix)
- 2006 16 Volt – Various Artists – Hordes of The Elite (Glitch Bitch v1.0 Mix)
- 2006 Various Artists – Escape From Earth (Das Bomb Props Mix)
- 2007 Project 44 – Coup De'Tat – The System Reworked (Glitch Mode Soulja Mix)
- 2007 Rabbit Junk – S/T reissue (Glitch Mode Googles the Green Party Mix)
- 2007 Various Artists – The Virus Has Been Spread : A Tribute to Atari Teenage Riot
- 2007 Various Artists – Songs from the Hydrogen Bar : A Tribute to Chemlab
- 2007 Caustic vs Justin Matthew Mooney (Glitch Mode's Tape-age Rape-age Mix)
- 2007 See Colin Slash – Fish in a Bag Retrospective (Goth Topic Mix)
- 2007 Acumen Nation – Psycho the Rapist (additional programming on "Holy Terror")
- 2008 UCNX – Absolute Zero (O.O remix)
- 2008 Circus Of Dead Squirrels – TPCM2 Judgement Day Remixing The Masscare – Utopia Burning (Cyanotic Celebu-Twat Mix)
- 2008 Cyanotic Presents – Gears Gone Wild [remixes for 16 Volt, Rabbit Junk and numerous others]
- 2009 Caustic – This Is Jizzcore – Agent Of Chaos (Cyanotic Mix)
- 2009 lammynewt – LOUsid (Cyanotic Remix)
- 2009 Ad-ver-sary – Ancients (Cyanotic Remix)
- 2009 The Gothsicles – Sega Lugosi's Dead (I Thought The CD Player Was Skipping... But It Was Just a Cyanotic Song)
- 2009 16 Volt – American Porn Songs (additional programming on numerous tracks)
- 2009 Left Spine Down – U Can't Stop The Bomb (Cyanotic Remix) on Smartbomb 2.3: The Underground Mixes
- 2009 The Named – formerly The Shizit (additional programming on numerous tracks)
- 2009 Slave Unit – Certificate Of Participation – Mold (Head-Fed Mix By Cyanotic)
- 2010 16 Volt – American Porn Songs Remixed (Hate Hegel Mix)
- 2010 am.psych – Reload (Ammo Depletion Mix By Cyanotic)
- 2011 Common Man Down – Self Addiction (Cyanotic Mix)
- 2013 Cold Waves II Sampler: Acumen vs. Cyanotic – Stages Of Grief
- 2013 Glitch Mode Presents: Merry Glitchmas
- 2014 Front Line Assembly – Heartquake (Cyanotic Remix)
- 2014 Ion Plasma Incineration – Outer Reality Engine – Skies Of Retribution (Cyanotic Remix)
- 2014 CRL Studios Presents: The Fourth Wavelength – Disconnect Me [Glitch.Mode.Edit]
- 2015 Worst Case Scenario: Cause + Effect – (Textbeak Remix)
- 2019 Nuclear*Sun – The Cleansing (redux) – Second Skin (Cyanotic mix) & The Cleansing (Glitch Mode Breaks mix)
