= Conscience Records =

Defunct record company in New York

Conscience Records was a record company in New York that existed between 1995 and 1998.

== History ==
Founded in 1995, Conscience Records signed East Coast band Powerman 5000, putting out their debut album The Blood Splat Rating System. Other artists included El Dopa, Acumen Nation, Grind and Mocean Worker. Powerman 5000 was signed to DreamWorks in 1996, where they re-released the Bloodsplat album as Mega! Kung Fu Radio, remastered and with two new songs added and new artwork (including the Conscience logo). El Dopa recorded, but never released a follow-up album to their debut called United In States Of Narcolepsy. Krishna Venkatesh, singer and founder of El Dopa, currently lives in New Jersey.

Mocean Worker made one album for Conscience (Home Movies from the Brain Forest), subsequently leaving for Palm Records, Chris Blackwell's latest foray into the music industry after founding Island Records. Conscience was distributed by the now defunct label Never/Proper Records Group. Principals in the company were Enno Vandermeer and Jen Kriesel. Eric Bohnenstiel, label manager, later went on to appear on VH-1's "Top Moments In Metal". The company folded in 1998.
