= Stone-Ten Stitches =

1997 studio album by The Clay People

Studio album by Clay People
- Released: November 1997
- Recorded: February – April 1996
- Studio: Track in the Box (Baltimore, MD)
- Genre: Industrial metal, alternative metal
- Length: 48:24
- Label: Re-Constriction
- Producer: George Hagegeorge

Clay People chronology
Strange Day (1996)	Stone-Ten Stitches (1997)	The Clay People (1998)

Stone-Ten Stitches is the second studio album by Clay People, released in November 1997 by Re-Constriction Records.

== Reception ==
Aiding & Abetting gave the album a positive review, saying "Clay People has infused the metal guts with something very alive." Sonic Boom credited the album's mix with revealing the talent of the performers and focusing on Daniel Neet's vocals. Black Monday gave the album a mixed review and criticized the music's inability to hold the listeners interest.

== Track listing ==
All lyrics are written by Daniel Neet, except "Spider's Bride" by Roger Fracé; all music is composed by Daniel Neet, except "T.M.S." by Mike Guzzardi.

No.	Title	Length
1.	"Intro (Stitches)"	1:26
2.	"Stone"	4:01
3.	"Bloodsuckers"	3:53
4.	"Pariah"	3:11
5.	"Spider's Bride"	4:35
6.	"Pandora Complex"	4:35
7.	"Mechanized Mind"	4:03
8.	"T.M.S."	4:35
9.	"Little Jack"	6:35
10.	"A Strange Day"	5:53
11.	"Stone" (Remix)	5:33

== Personnel ==
Adapted from the Stone-Ten Stitches liner notes.

Clay People

- Brian McGarvey – electric guitar, bass guitar, programming
- Daniel Neet – lead vocals, programming

Production and design

- George Hagegeorge – production, additional programming
- Melissa Sharlot – backing vocals (5)
- D. Patrick Walsh – cover art, art direction, design

== Release history ==
Region	Date	Label	Format	Catalog
United States	1997	Re-Constriction	CD	REC-026
