= Underground, Inc. =

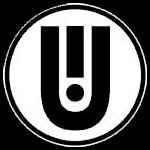
- Parent company: Invisible Records
- Founded: 2000; 26 years ago
- Founder: Martin Atkins
- Status: Defunct
- Distributor: Caroline Distribution
- Genre: Various
- Country of origin: United States
- Official website: invisiblerecords.com

Underground, Inc. was a Chicago-based subsidiary of Invisible Records, consisting of a collective of independent labels, producing various studio albums by Invisible Records artists, side projects and compilations with the same focus on being artist driven as its parent label. Music ranged from indie, goth, electro, punk, and industrial.

== Artists ==
- Acumen Nation
- Apocalypse Theater
- Asmodeus X
- Chemlab
- Chris Connelly
- Colony 5
- DJ? Acucrack
- Dkay.com
- Einstürzende Neubauten
- Hate Dept.
- Chris Haskett
- Keith Levene
- Kill Memory Crash
- Meg Lee Chin
- Mistle Thrush
- More Machine Than Man
- My Life with the Thrill Kill Kult
- Nocturne
- Rachel Stamp
- Pigface
- Public Image Limited
- Professional Murder Music
- Razed in Black
- Sheep on Drugs
- Slick Idiot
- SMP
- Sunshine Blind
- The Damage Manual
- Things Outside the Skin
- Tub Ring
