= The Clay People =

American rock band

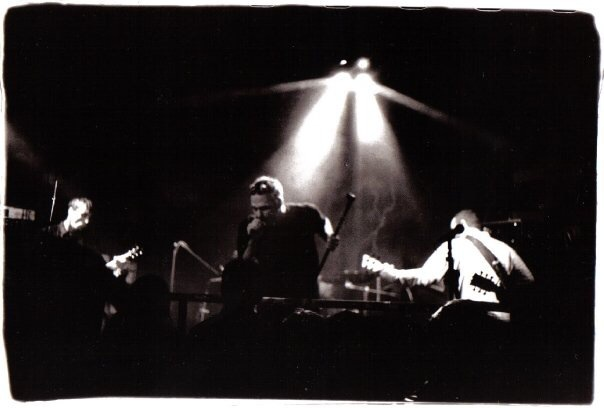

Background information
- Also known as: Clay People
- Origin: Albany, New York, U.S.
- Genres: Alternative metal; industrial metal; industrial rock; alternative rock
- Members: Daniel Neet; Dan Dinsmore; Brian McGarvey; Eric Braymer; Jared Weed
- Past members: Mike Guzzardi; Eliot Engelman; Peter E. Porto; Brendan Slater; D. Patrick Walsh; Walter Flakus; J. Alexander Eller; Eric Schwanke; Vegas Nacy; Karla Williams; Duane Beer; Will Nivens; Kevin Bakarian; John Stevens; David Bourgeois; Kevin Micheal Scott; Jon McClendon

The Clay People is an American rock band based in Albany, New York. Singer Daniel Neet has been the only constant member throughout the band's history, providing lyrics and a frontman persona. Guitarist Brian McGarvey and drummer Dan Dinsmore joined in '94 and '96 respectively. These three formed the core unit that would include an ever-changing lineup of musicians, as its style evolved from American coldwave to post-grunge rock and metal.

== History ==
Forming in 1989 as "Clay People", the band debuted with the 1991 EP Toy Box before signing to Re-Constriction Records and issuing their debut album Firetribe in May 1993. Clay People's second EP The Iron Icon and studio album Stone-Ten Stitches followed in 1995 and 1996 respectively. The group added "The" to their name with the release of their 1998 self-titled album, marking a change in direction from their dance club roots to a live rock band with a lineup featuring Neet, Brian McGarvey (guitar), Mike Guzzardi (guitar), D. Patrick Walsh (bass) and Dan Dinsmore (drums). The album was produced by Neil Kernon for Slipdisc Records and was the band's most successful release. Songs from the record were included in the soundtracks to the films Strangeland, Universal Soldier: The Return, and Marked for Death.

Internal conflicts caused the band to go on hiatus in the early 2000s as members pursued solo and side projects or launched new bands. A new album from The Clay People, Waking the Dead, was released on May 22, 2007 via Overit Records with a lineup featuring only Neet, Dinsmore and McGarvey from the 1996 band. Along with the new release was a music video for the album's first single, "Supersonic Overdrive". Metroland, the local Albany weekly newspaper, featured the band on their front page as "The Return of The Clay People", following the album's release and a successful performance at Edgefest, a local radio station music festival. Shortly following the release of Waking the Dead, the band once again become inactive.

In June 2012, Neet, McGarvey and Dinsmore revived The Clay People to perform at the Cold Waves festival "The Jamie Duffy Memorial Concert" in Chicago in honor of the guitarist from Acumen Nation who killed himself earlier that year. The Clay People began recording again, however, continuing internal conflicts and ongoing problems associated with substance abuse led to more band member lineup changes and an unfinished album as of five years later. The Clay People released a new album, Demon Hero And Other Extraordinary Phantasmagoric Anomalies & Fables, featuring a revolving door of recording musicians, on the Magnetic Eye label in September 2018. They began to play shows in the northeast and midwest US again citing their "return" as a band, but were disrupted by COVID-19 lockdown in 2020 and focused on recording, which led to their album Cult Hypnotica in July 2022, which was accompanied by a comic book, Colossus, and hometown shows in Albany. This album was released by the Overit creative agency and recording studio in Albany, which Dan Dinsmore had founded in 1993.

== Members ==
- Daniel Neet – vocals
- Brian McGarvey – guitar
- Dan Dinsmore – drums
- Jared Weed – guitar
- Eric Braymer – bass

=== Former members ===
- Mike Guzzardi – guitar
- Phil Montelone – bass
- Eliot Engelman – bass
- D. Patrick Walsh – bass
- Brendan Slater – bass
- Eric Schwanke – bass
- John Delehanty – guitar
- J. Alexander Eller – keyboards and programming
- Peter E. Porto (co-founder) – bass
- Walter Flakus (ex-Stabbing Westward) – guitar, keyboards, backing vocals
- Karla Williams – guitar
- Duane Beer – guitar
- Will Nivens – guitar
- Bill Rettie – keyboards
- Kevin Bakarian – drums
- David Bourgeois – drums
- Kevin Micheal Scott – guitar
- Jon McClendon – drums
- William Ralph – drums

== Discography ==
- The Calling b/w Nothing 7" (1990)
- Toy Box (1991) Production credit George Hagegeorge
- Firetribe (1993) Production credit George Hagegeorge
- Cringe (Germany Release) (1995) production credit George Hagegeorge, Van Christie, Jason McNinch
- The Iron Icon (1995) production credit Van Christie, Jason McNinch
- Strange Day (1996) production credit George Hagegeorge
- Stone-Ten Stitches (1997) production credit George Hagegeorge
- The Clay People (1998) production credit Neil Kernon
- The Headhunter Demos (2001)
- Waking the Dead (2007)
- Demon Hero and Other Extraordinary Phantasmagoric Anomalies & Fables (2018)
- Cult Hypnotica (2022)

=== Compilation appearances ===
- Shut Up Kitty: A Cyber-Based Covers Compilation (various artists) (1994) - "Paranoid"
- Tribute to Black Sabbath: Eternal Masters (various artists) (1994) - "Paranoid"
- Thugs 'N' Kisses (various artists) (1995) - "Pale God (Raw Version)"
- Operation Beatbox (various artists) (1996) - "Jump Around"
- Strangeland (various artists, film soundtrack) (1998) - "Awake"
- Universal Soldier: The Return (various artists, television soundtrack) (1998) - "Awake"
- ColdWaves II (various artists) (1997/2013) - "Stone" (Remix by Chris "Boom" Paige)
