= Acumen Nation =

American industrial rock band

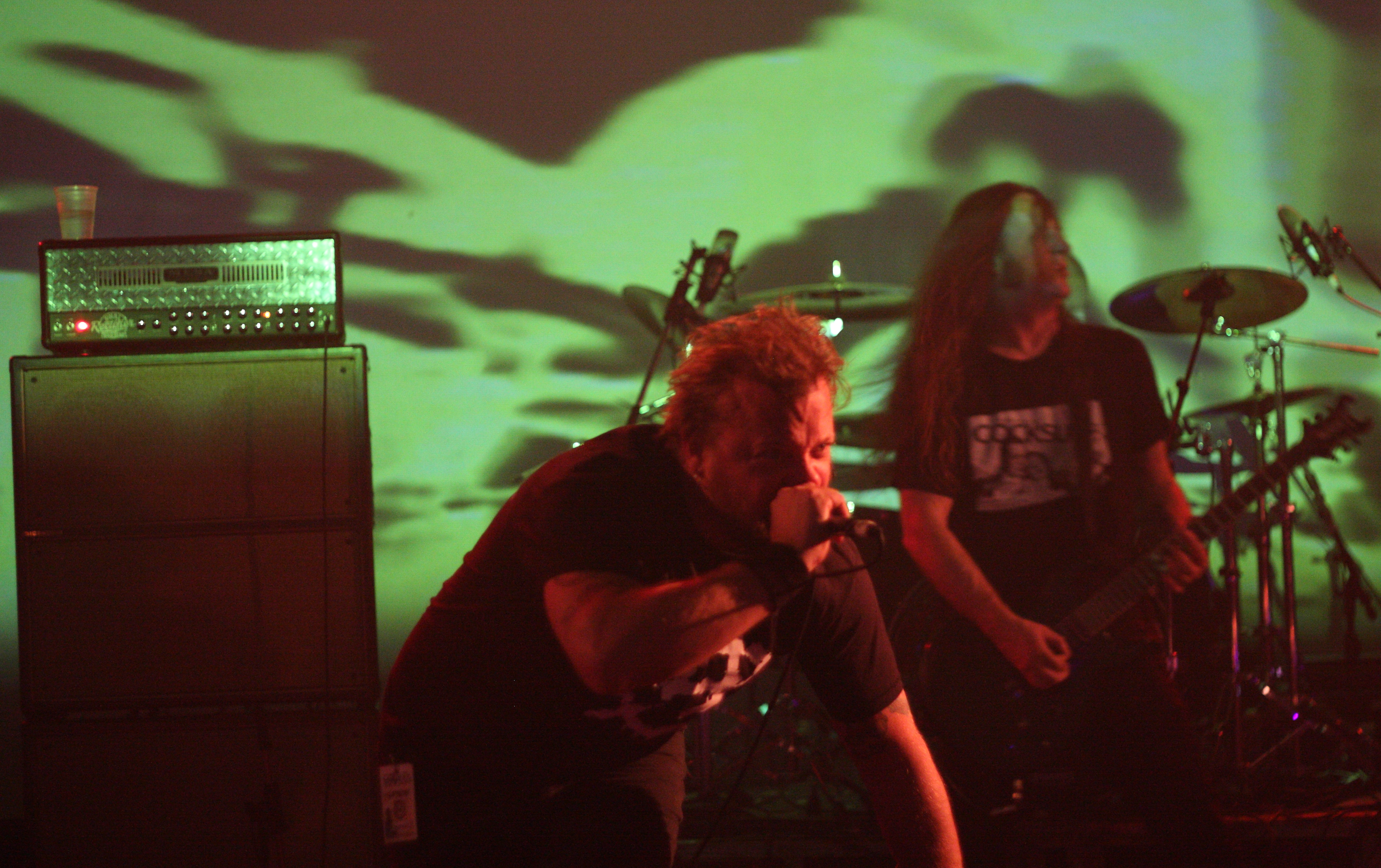
- Acumen Nation performing in 2014

Background information
- Born: Acumen
- Origin: Chicago, Illinois, U.S.
- Genres: Industrial metal, industrial rock
- Years active: 1988–present
- Members: Jason Novak; Ethan Novak; Nez Llrlrr
- Past members: Gregory Lopez; Jamie Duffy; Eliot Engelman; Dan Brill; Brian Elza; Eric Alvarez

Acumen Nation is an American industrial rock/metal band from Chicago, Illinois.

== History ==
=== Early career ===
Formed in 1988 as Acumen by Jason Novak and Ethan Novak, the band released several cassette demos before self-releasing the CD demo Transmissions from Eville in 1994. Along with bassist Greg Lopez, they put the record out themselves under the name Robot Records. During shows for this period, the band added Jamie Duffy as a guitarist/engineer, and shortly afterwards the four-piece band was noticed by independent industrial label Fifth Colvmn Records, who signed the band and reissued Transmissions from Eville worldwide.

The band subsequently embarked on national tours with The Clay People and 16 Volt, before heading back to Chicago Trax Studios to record their follow-up, entitled Territory=Universe, with a denser multi-layered sound than the previous record. Acumen was invited to join another national tour with industrial rock pioneers Chemlab, as well as shorter stints supporting industrial rock veterans KMFDM and Monster Voodoo Machine.

Although the peak of the Industrial rock scene in Chicago had passed by the time Acumen emerged as a national act, Acumen were able to establish themselves on the circuit through continuous touring and work on a number of different projects. The Iron Lung Corp. was a band composed of Acumen and The Clay People from Albany, New York. Their first record Big Shiny Spears (1996) featured covers of Nitzer Ebb's hits "Join in the Chant" and "Murderous".

=== Name dispute ===
In 1997, the band were forced to change their name due to a legal dispute with a preexisting progressive rock band also called Acumen. The band split their project into two halves—the drum and bass influenced DJ? Acucrack, and the more traditional rock format of Acumen Nation. Tours for both projects followed. In 1998, Greg Lopez left the band to pursue other interests, and was replaced by Eric Alvarez. The four recorded 2000's Strike 4. Alvarez left the band before the record was released and was replaced by Eliot Engelman.

=== Later career ===
In 2000, Jason Novak and Jamie Duffy launched their own record label, CrackNation Records, through which all future Acumen-related material would be released. In 2005, the label released Cyanotic's debut album, Transhuman.

The end of 2001 saw the release of Live Farewell 2001, which was to signal a hiatus for the band, as the recording was the final performance featuring Ethan Novak, who left to form the band Cordy. He was replaced in the lineup by Dan Brill.

Eliot Engelman left following the release of Anticore in 2006 and the subsequent tour with Front Line Assembly in mid-2007, although the band maintained for some time that he had not left, before they finally admitted it. Ethan Novak returned to play bass during the "PsychoTransHumanoid" 2007 and 2008 tours of the east and west coasts with Cyanotic, promoting the simultaneous release of Acumen Nation's Psycho the Rapist, DJ? Acucrack's Humanoids from the Deep, and Cyanotic's Transhuman 2.0. In 2009, Jason Novak and Brill composed the soundtrack for the video game Unbound Saga. It featured new compositions, albeit with pieces taken from Acumen Nation and DJ? Acucrack material. In 2010, the soundtrack was released by CrackNation, credited to both Acumen Nation and DJ? Acucrack.

On June 21, 2012, Acumen Nation guitarist Jamie Duffy died due to an overdose of sleeping pills, which was made public via his personal Twitter account early that morning. The tweet "this is how the end begins..." along with a link to a photo of a plate with three white bottles of sleeping pills and a plate full of the bright blue pills themselves. The photo was later removed, but the tweet remained.

=== Cold Waves: The Jamie Duffy Memorial Concert ===
On July 6, 2012, a memorial concert was announced entitled "Cold Waves: The Jamie Duffy Memorial Concert", to be held at Chicago's Bottom Lounge on September 7, 2012. Artists appearing at the event included Paul Barker, Chris Connelly, Jared Louche, Martin Atkins, Steven Seibold, Jim Marcus, Jason Novak, and Eric Powell, performing tracks by Revco/Revolting Cocks, Chemlab, 16volt, Acumen Nation, Damage Manual, Hate Dept, The Clay People, and Go Fight!/Die Warzau. Additional artists to perform were Czar, Cyanotic, i:Scintilla, and The Final Cut, with DJ sets by Zoltar, host of the satellite radio show Subterranean and a former Q101 Chicago and WXRT Chicago radio host.

The concert also noted that Duffy had worked at many Chicago venues including The House of Blues, The Cubby Bear, The Abbey Pub and The Cabaret Metro/Metro Chicago as stage manager and sound engineer, provided engineering and technical support at Chicago Trax recording studios, and had contributed to releases on many different larger and independent record labels including 21st Circuitry, Bit Riot Records, BMG/RCA/D-Tribe Records, Cargo Music/Re-constriction Records, Conscience Records, Cracknation Records, Crash Music Inc., E-Magine Records, Failure To Communicate Records/FTC Records, Fifth Colvmn Records, Glitch Mode Recordings, Underground, Inc., Island/Def Jam Records, Katharsis Records, Metropolis Records, MOGworld Records, Tinman Records, TVT Records, Warner Bros. Records, Wax Trax! Records, WTII Records and Zoth Ommog Records, working with artists such as 16Volt, Acumen Nation, Armageddon Dildos, Chemlab, Chris Connelly, Cyanotic, Dean Garcia, DJ? Acucrack, Hypefactor, Iron Lung Corp, Lard, Method Man (featuring Mary J. Blige), Ministry, Monster Voodoo Machine, Pigface, Sister Machine Gun, Sister Soleil, Toni Halliday and The Wake.

== Members ==
Starting in 2012, Acumen Nation's activity drastically decreased, reuniting only for sporadic one-off live shows and brief tours, with various members joining Jason Novak in a variety of roles.

=== Current members ===
- Jason Novak – vocals, rhythm guitar, programming (1988–present)
- Ethan Novak – lead guitar (2026–present), drums, bass (1991–2001, 2007–2012)
- Nez Llrlrr – drums (2026–present)

=== Past members ===
- Gregory Lopez – bass (1993–1998)
- Jamie Duffy – lead guitar, programming (1994–2012; died 2012)
- Eric Alvarez – bass (1998–2000)
- Eliot Engelman – bass (2000–2007)
- Dan Brill – drums (2001–2012)
- Brian Elza – lead guitar (2003–2006)

=== Timeline ===
Color denotes main live duty.

== Discography ==
=== Studio albums ===
- Transmissions From Eville (1995, Fifth Colvmn Records) (Note: Originally released under the "Acumen" band name.)
- Territory=Universe (1996, Fifth Colvmn Records)
- More Human Heart (1997, Conscience Records)
- Strike 4 (2000, CrackNation Records)
- The 5ifth Column (2002, Invisible Records)
- Lord of the Cynics (2003, CrackNation Records)
- Anticore (2006, CrackNation Records/Crash Music Inc.)
- Psycho the Rapist (2007, CrackNation Records)
- Unbound Saga (2010, CrackNation Records) (Note: Originally released as a soundtrack album credited to both Acumen Nation and DJ? Acucrack.)

=== Demo albums ===
- Youthinasia (1992, Independent)
- Ultraviolent (1992, Independent)
- Unkind (1993, Robot Records)
- Transmissions From Eville (Demo) (1994, Robot Records)

=== Live albums ===
- Live Farewell 2001 (2001, CrackNation Records)

=== Remix albums ===
- Coming Down: The Bastard Remix Album (2002, Invisible Records)

=== Compilations ===
- Artifacts: 1990–1993 Volume 1 (2004, CrackNation Records/Invisible Records)
- What the Fuck?: 10 Years of Armed Audio Warfare (2005, CrackNation Records/WTII Records)
- Artifacts II: 1989–1994 (2008, CrackNation Records)
- Artifacts III: 1988–1993 (2014, CrackNation Records)

=== Singles ===
- "Unkind" (1997, Conscience Records)
- "If You Were" (1998, Conscience Records)

== Side projects ==
- DJ? Acucrack
- Iron Lung Corp
- Fawn
- Glytsch
- Czar
- Cocksure
- The Splynter Group
- Vampyre Anvil
- Ahnusse
