= KMFDM discography =

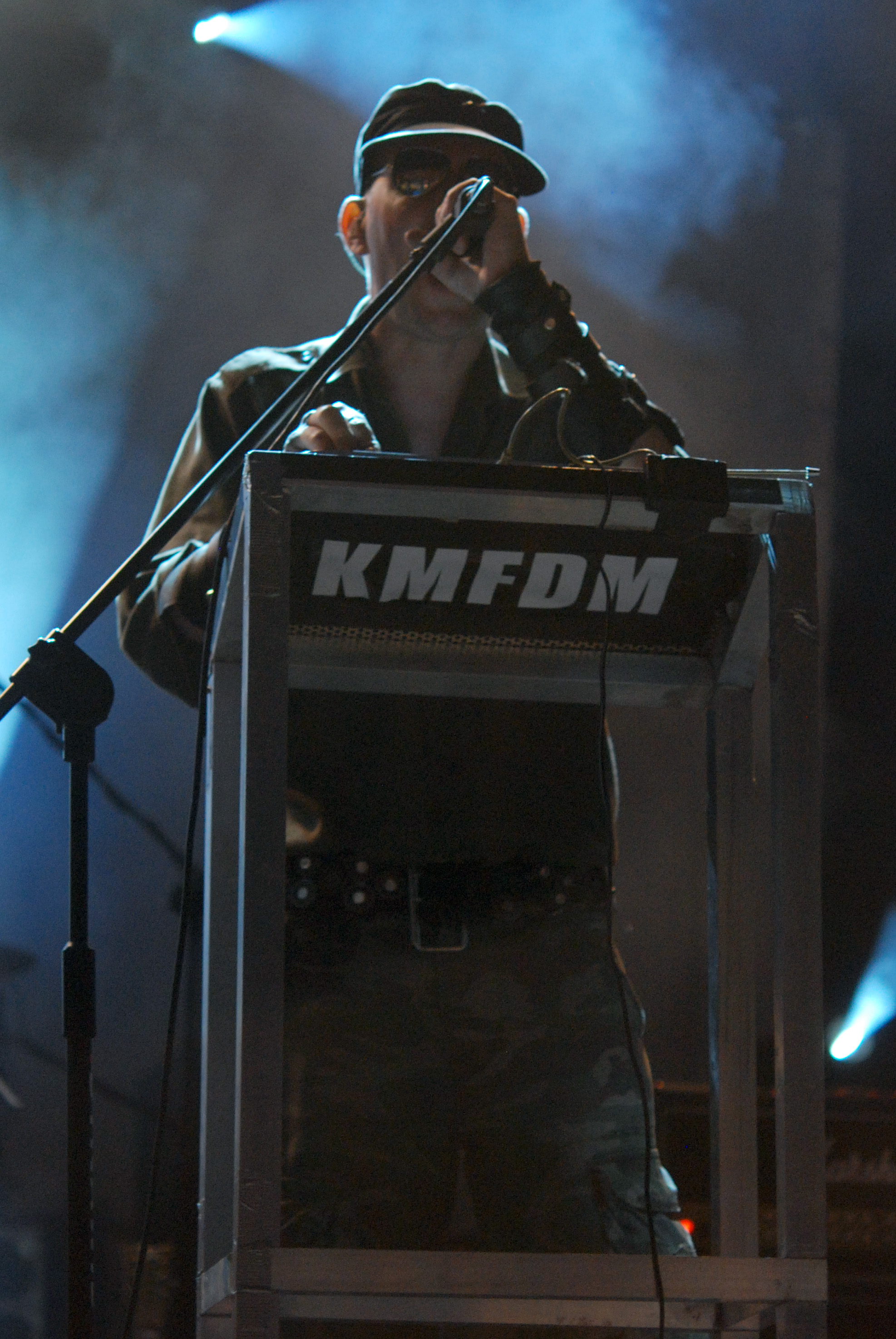
- Sascha Konietzko performing live
- Studio albums: 23
- Soundtrack albums: 13
- Live albums: 4
- Compilation albums: 10
- Singles: 24+
- Video albums: 6
- Remix albums: 6
- Collaborations: 2
- Other appearances: 3
- Remixes: ~100

The industrial rock band KMFDM has released more than two hundred songs in their over-forty-year-long career spanning more than fifty unique releases.

== Artwork ==
Beginning with the British release of 1986's What Do You Know, Deutschland?, British artist Aidan "Brute!" Hughes has designed the artwork for twenty-one of KMFDM's twenty-three studio albums and all but two of their singles. He has also designed the artwork for their three remix albums and two live albums, and their 2010 compilation releases.

All of his work shares a distinct visual style inspired by Golden Age comic artists, Russian Constructivists, Italian Futurists, and woodcut artists. The design and complexity of the works have varied over time from primarily simple mono- or bi-color motifs (early albums) to highly detailed multi-color schemes (Attak, WWIII).

The remaining cover artwork has been a mixture of photos and work done by other artists.

== Albums ==
=== Studio albums ===
Title	Details	Peak chart positions			Notes
Title	Details	US	US Ind.	US Dance	
What Do You Know, Deutschland?	Released: 12 December 1986; Label: Z Records, Skysaw	—	—	—	Was not released domestically in the US until 1991 by Wax Trax! Records. Reissued in 2006 on Metropolis/KMFDM Records.
Don't Blow Your Top	Released: 12 February 1988; Label: Skysaw, Wax Trax!	—	—	—	Reissued in 2006 on Metropolis/KMFDM Records.
UAIOE	Released: 7 October 1989; Label: Wax Trax!	—	—	—	US release on Wax Trax! Records did not contain the songs "More & Faster"/"Rip the System"/"Naff Off", whereas the domestic, German-based label Cashbeat Records version did (and the UK version by Strike Back Records adds the additional song "Virus" as well). Wax Trax! instead offered a domestic US release of a 12" single entitled 'More & Faster' containing the 3 aforementioned songs. The song "Virus" could also only be found on a Wax Trax! single release. Reissued in 2006 on Metropolis/KMFDM Records.
Naïve	Released: 15 November 1990; Label: Wax Trax!	—	—	—	Removed from distribution in 1993 due to an unlicensed sample of Carl Orff's "O Fortuna" on the track "Liebeslied". It was reissued as Naïve/Hell to Go in 1994 with several tracks remixed, and reissued again in 2006 with tracks from both releases on Metropolis/KMFDM Records. Only the original release of Naïve contains the original version of "Liebeslied" and has become a collector's item.
Money	Released: 1 February 1992; Label: Wax Trax!	—	—	—	Reissued in 2006 on Metropolis/KMFDM Records.
Angst	Released: 12 October 1993; Label: Wax Trax!/TVT	—	—	—	Reissued in 2006 on Metropolis/KMFDM Records.
Nihil	Released: 4 April 1995; Label: Wax Trax!/TVT	—	—	—	Nihil is one of only a handful of KMFDM releases that do not feature cover artwork by Brute!. The cover features a painting by Francesca Sundsten, wife of drummer Bill Rieflin. Reissued in 2007 on Metropolis/KMFDM Records. 209,000 copies sold.
Xtort	Released: 25 June 1996; Label: Wax Trax!/TVT	92	—	—	Reissued in 2007 on Metropolis/KMFDM Records. 200,000+ copies sold.
Symbols	Released: 23 September 1997; Label:Wax Trax!/TVT	137	—	—	Reissued in 2007 on Metropolis/KMFDM Records.
Adios	Released: 20 April 1999; Label: Wax Trax!/TVT	—	—	—	Adios was intended to be KMFDM's final album due to an escalating rift among the core members of the band. It marks the last appearance of core members En Esch and Günter Schulz on a KMFDM record. Reissued in 2007 on Metropolis/KMFDM Records.
Attak	Released: 19 March 2002; Label: Metropolis	—	11	—	Attak marked the return of KMFDM after a three-year hiatus and the last to feature Tim Sköld as a main collaborator (he would later contribute to Blitz and the collaborative record, Skold vs. KMFDM). See also MDFMK.
WWIII	Released: 23 September 2003; Label: Sanctuary	—	—	3	The last album to feature contributions from Raymond Watts until 2019's Paradise.
Hau Ruck	Released: 13 September 2005; Label: Metropolis/KMFDM	—	48	5	While it was initially promoted with a working title of FUBAR, Hau Ruck broke a long-standing KMFDM tradition of five-letter album titles. It includes a cover of "Mini Mini Mini" by Jacques Dutronc.
Tohuvabohu	Released: 21 August 2007; Label: Metropolis/KMFDM	—	29	4	In biblical Hebrew, the phrase "tohu va bohu" means "without form and void" or "chaos and utter confusion".
Blitz	Released: 24 March 2009; Label: Metropolis/KMFDM	—	—	9	Includes a cover of "Being Boiled" by The Human League.
WTF?!	Released: 26 April 2011; Label: Metropolis/KMFDM	—	—	8	Originally titled Zilch
Kunst	Released: 26 February 2013; Metropolis/KMFDM	—	49	10	
Our Time Will Come	Released: 14 October 2014; Metropolis/KMFDM	—	—	12	
Hell Yeah	Released: 18 August 2017; Label: earMUSIC/KMFDM	—	20	14	
Paradise	Released: 27 September 2019; Label: Metropolis/KMFDM	—	45	—	
Hyëna	Released: 9 September 2022; Label: Metropolis/KMFDM	—	—	—	Sources:
Let Go	Released: 2 February 2024; Label: Metropolis/KMFDM	—	—	—	
Enemy	Released: 6 February 2026; Label: Metropolis/KMFDM	—	—	—	
"—" denotes a recording that did not chart or was not released in that territory.

=== Archival albums ===
Release date	Title	Label	Notes
2002	Opium	First World Records	Originally recorded in either the 1980s or 1990s, but not released until 2002

=== Live albums ===
Release date	Title	Label	Notes
3 June 2003	Sturm & Drang Tour 2002	Metropolis	Includes highlights from KMFDM's comeback world tour in support of their album Attak.
27 July 2004	WWIII Live 2003	Sanctuary	Chronicles KMFDM's world tour in support of their album WWIII.
4 September 2014	WE ARE	Metropolis/KMFDM	KMFDM self-released video version in 2015 is titled 'We Are KMFDM'. The DVD version released in 2016 as a companion disc to the deluxe edition of the compilation/remix album 'ROCKS (Milestones Reloaded)' is simply entitled 'Live 30th Anniversary Concert'.
26 October 2018	Live in the USSA	earMUSIC	Songs compiled from the 2017 Hell Yeah Tour

=== Compilation albums ===
Release date	Title	Label	Notes
1995	Year of the Pig	Wax Trax!/TVT	Collection of four previously released songs. Released on 12" vinyl.
1995	The Year of the Pig Collection	Wax Trax!/TVT	Collection of seven previously released songs included as a bonus disc with the Canadian release of Juke Joint Jezebel.
17 November 1998	Agogo	Wax Trax!/TVT	Collection of rare and unreleased tracks. It includes a cover of U2's "Mysterious Ways".
17 November 1998	Retro	Wax Trax!/TVT	Retro was originally a promotional disc released to radio stations as a playlist. It was reissued as a "greatest hits" compilation in 1998. All tracks are taken from earlier KMFDM albums.
11 October 2004	84–86	KMFDM	84–86 is a two-disc collection of previously unreleased material from KMFDM's early career. It includes cover versions of "Get It On/Bang a Gong" by T. Rex and "Too Much Monkey Business" by Chuck Berry.
3 June 2008	Extra, Vol. 1	Metropolis/KMFDM	First in a series of three two-disc collections of songs from out-of-print singles and other rare tracks not otherwise available on the studio albums.
5 August 2008	Extra, Vol. 2	Metropolis/KMFDM	Second in a series of three two-disc collections of songs from out-of-print singles.
8 October 2008	Extra, Vol. 3	Metropolis/KMFDM	Third in a series of three two-disc collections of songs from out-of-print singles.
28 September 2010	Würst	Metropolis/KMFDM	Single-disc greatest hits compilation.
28 September 2010	Greatest Shit	Metropolis/KMFDM	Two-disc greatest hits compilation; first disc is identical to Würst.
9 September 2016	Rocks – Milestones Reloaded	earMUSIC	CD+DVD media book, including the DVD We Are KMFDM

=== Remix albums ===
Release date	Title	Label	Notes
1 March 1994	Naïve/Hell to Go	Wax Trax!/TVT	Reissue of Naïve with several tracks remixed and the unlicensed sample removed. Unique tracks included on the 2006 reissue of Naïve.
9 May 2006	Ruck Zuck	Metropolis/KMFDM	Remixes of songs from 2005's Hau Ruck. Includes a cover of "Der Mussolini" by D.A.F.
19 February 2008	Brimborium	Metropolis/KMFDM	Remixes of songs from 2007's Tohuvabohu.
5 January 2010	Krieg	Metropolis/KMFDM	Remixes of songs from 2009's Blitz.
21 August 2020	In Dub	Metropolis	Reggae and dub mixes of previously released songs.
23 May 2025	Hau Ruck 2025	Metropolis	Original album remixed and remastered.

=== Collaborations ===
Release date	Title	Label	Notes
1 December 1994	KMFDM vs. Pig: Sin Sex & Salvation	Wax Trax!/TVT	Collaborative EP with PIG; out of print.
24 February 2009	Skold vs. KMFDM	KMFDM	Joint project between Sascha Konietzko and former KMFDM/MDFMK member Tim Skold.
19 January 2024	KMFDM vs. Pig: Sin Sex & Salvation (Deluxe)	Armalyte Industries	Collaborative EP with PIG; Includes remastered and alternate versions of songs from the original Wax Trax!/TVT and Polystar releases.

== Singles/EPs ==
Most of these singles have been reissued as special edition 7" records (limited to 250 copies each) from March 2008 to February 2010 in a series called 24/7.

Release date	Title	Label	24/7 series number	Notes
1987	"Kickin' Ass"	Z Records	1, 25	Out of print.
November 1988	"Don't Blow Your Top"	Wax Trax!	2	Out of print.
June 1989	"More & Faster"	Wax Trax!	3	Out of print.
August 1989	"Virus"	Wax Trax!	4	Out of print.
August 1990	"Godlike"	Wax Trax!	5	Out of print.
June 1991	"Naïve" / "Days of Swine & Roses"	Wax Trax!	6	Split single with My Life with the Thrill Kill Kult. Out of print. #21 Billboard Dance Club Songs
25 June 1991	"Split"	Wax Trax!	7	Out of print. #46 Billboard Dance Club Songs
8 January 1992	"Vogue"	Wax Trax!	8	Out of print. #19 Billboard Dance Club Songs
28 April 1992	"Money" / "Bargeld"	Wax Trax!	9	Out of print. #36 Billboard Dance Club Songs
15 September 1992	"Help Us—Save Us—Take Us Away"	Wax Trax!	10	Out of print.
October 1992	"Sucks"	Wax Trax!/TVT	11	Out of print.
September 23, 1993	"A Drug Against War"	Wax Trax!/TVT	12	Out of print. #17 RPM Alternative 30
15 February 1994	"Light"	Wax Trax!/TVT	13	Out of print. #31 Billboard Dance Club Songs
31 October 1994	"Glory"	Wax Trax!/TVT	14	Out of print.
28 February 1995	"Juke Joint Jezebel"	Wax Trax!/TVT	15	Out of print. #27 Billboard Dance Club Songs
1995	"Juke Joint Jezebel": The Giorgio Morodor Mixes	Wax Trax!/TVT		Out of print.
31 October 1995	"Brute"	Wax Trax!/TVT	16	Out of print.
31 October 1995	"Trust"/"Juke Joint Jezebel"	Wax Trax!/TVT	17	German-only single. Out of print.
15 August 1996	"Power"	Wax Trax!/TVT	18	Promotional release only. Out of print.
12 October 1996	"Rules"	Wax Trax!/TVT	19	Out of print.
1997	"Megalomaniac"	Dragnet Records	20	Out of print. #22 Billboard Bubbling Under 100
1997	"Anarchy"	Wax Trax!/TVT	21	Promotional release only. Out of print.
20 January 1998	MDFMK	Wax Trax!/TVT		Out of print.
5 February 2002	"Boots"	Metropolis		First release following the reforming of KMFDM.
1 December 2009	"D.I.Y."	KMFDM	22	Limited release of 250 7" vinyl singles.
1 January 2010	"Adios"	KMFDM	23	Limited release of 250 7" vinyl singles.
1 February 2010	"Day of Light"	KMFDM	24	Limited release of 250 7" vinyl singles.
14 September 2010	"Godlike 2010"	KMFDM		Limited release of 1,000 CD singles. Also available indefinitely as a download.
17 December 2010	"Light 2010"	KMFDM		Limited release of 1,000 CD singles. Also available indefinitely as a download.
8 March 2011	"Krank"	KMFDM/Metropolis		#3 Billboard Dance Singles Sales
15 October 2011	"A Drug Against Wall Street"	KMFDM/Metropolis		Released as free download at the KMFDM home page in support of the October 15th, 2011 Global Day of Action "Occupy Wall Street" movement
22 May 2012	"Amnesia"	KMFDM/Metropolis		
10 July 2015	"Salvation"	KMFDM/Metropolis		
23 June 2017	"Yeah!"	earMUSIC		
13 September 2019	"Paradise" (Single Edit)	Metropolis		Digital single tract release.
Early 2021	"Juke Joint Jezebel 2021" (single 2021 edit)	KMFDM		

== Other appearances ==
=== Soundtracks ===
Release date	Title	Song	Notes
1992	Hellraiser III: Hell on Earth	"Ooh La La"	Track re-released on Agogo.
1995	Bad Boys	"Juke Joint Jezebel"	Single Mix
1995	Hideaway	"Go to Hell"	Fuck MTV Mix
1995	Johnny Mnemonic	"Virus"	Pestilence Mix
1995	Mortal Kombat	"Juke Joint Jezebel"	Giorgio Moroder Metropolis Mix
1995	Street Fighter II: The Animated Movie	"Ultra"	
1997	Mortal Kombat Annihilation	"Megalomaniac"	Single Mix
1997	Wing Commander: Prophecy	"Stray Bullet"	
1998	Test Drive 5	"Megalomaniac", "Leid und Elend", "Anarchy"	Instrumental versions
1999	Beowulf	"Witness"	
2004	Spider-Man 2	Entire score	
2009	Brütal Legend	"Free Your Hate", "Rip The System"	
2009	NCIS: The Official TV Soundtrack	"Love Is Like"	Different lyrics than album version
2011	Saints Row: The Third	"WWIII"	

=== Compilations ===
Release date	Song	Album	Label	Notes
1992	"Mysterious Ways"	Shut Up Kitty: A Cyber-Based Covers Compilation	Re-Constriction Records	Cover of U2 song
1994	"Virus", "Godlike"	Black Box – Wax Trax! Records: The First 13 Years	Wax Trax! Records	12" versions
1999	"Material Girl"	Virgin Voices: A Tribute to Madonna, Vol. 1.	Cleopatra Records	Cover of Madonna song
2016	"Make Love"	Electronic Saviors: Industrial Music To Cure Cancer, Vol.4: Retaliation	Metropolis	Unreleased Track from 1994
2025	"King Nothing (Tepid Mix)"	Load Deluxe Box Set	Blackened Recordings	
