= Greatest Shit =

Compilation album by KMFDM
- Released: September 28, 2010
- Recorded: 1986–2010
- Genre: Industrial rock
- Length: 145:33
- Label: Metropolis/KMFDM

KMFDM compilations chronology
Würst (2010)	Greatest Shit (2010)

Greatest Shit is a compilation album by KMFDM. It was released on September 28, 2010. This special edition version of Würst has the same track listing as that album on its first disc, and comes with a second disc of additional mixes and edits of new and classic KMFDM tracks.

== Track listing ==
=== Disc 1 ===
No.	Title	Album	Length
1.	"D.I.Y." (Edit)	Adios	4:19
2.	"Tohuvabohu" (Edit)	Tohuvabohu	4:44
3.	"Son of a Gun (Overhauled Mix)" (Edit)	Xtort	3:33
4.	"Juke Joint Jezebel (Single Mix)"	Nihil	4:10
5.	"Naïve" (Edit)	Naïve	3:44
6.	"Sucks (12" Mix)" (Edit)	Angst	3:57
7.	"Hau Ruck" (Edit)	Hau Ruck	3:26
8.	"More & Faster (12" Mix)"	UAIOE	3:32
9.	"Money (Radio Mix)"	Money	3:50
10.	"Megalomaniac (Single Mix)" (Edit)	Symbols	3:10
11.	"Virus (12" Mix)" (Edit)	Naïve	4:11
12.	"Light (Cellulite Radio Mix)"	Angst	3:49
13.	"Anarchy" (Edit)	Symbols	4:04
14.	"Vogue" (Edit)	Money	3:00
15.	"Split (12" Mix)" (Edit)	non-album single	3:54
16.	"WWIII" (Edit)	WWIII	4:29
17.	"Godlike (12" Mix)" (Edit)	Naïve	4:04
18.	"A Drug Against War (Single Mix)"	Angst	3:42
19.	"Power (Single Mix)" (Edit)	Xtort	3:08

=== Disc 2 ===
No.	Title	Album	Length
1.	"Go to Hell (Fuck MTV Mix)" (Edit)	Naïve	4:06
2.	"Don't Blow Your Top" (Edit)	Don't Blow Your Top	3:10
3.	"Looking for Strange" (Edit)	Tohuvabohu	3:57
4.	"Ultra" (Album Edit)	Nihil	3:41
5.	"Itchy Bitchy"	What Do You Know, Deutschland?	3:36
6.	"Dogma"	Xtort	4:07
7.	"Strut" (Edit)	Blitz	4:38
8.	"Kickin' Ass" (Edit)	What Do You Know, Deutschland?	2:44
9.	"Free Your Hate" (Edit)	Hau Ruck	4:47
10.	"Terror" (Edit)	Nihil	4:20
11.	"Rules" (Edit)	Xtort	3:24
12.	"Never Say Never" (Edit)	Blitz	3:49
13.	"Sturm & Drang" (Edit)	Attak	3:42
14.	"Glory" (Edit)	Angst	3:23
15.	"Attak/Reload" (Edit)	Attak	3:35
16.	"Waste"	Symbols	3:40
17.	"Trust" (Edit)	Nihil	3:42
18.	"Adios"	Adios	3:55
19.	"That's All" (Edit)	Adios	4:38
