= Extra, Vol. 1 =

Compilation album by KMFDM
- Released: June 3, 2008
- Genre: Industrial rock
- Label: Metropolis/KMFDM

KMFDM compilations chronology
84–86 (2004)	Extra, Vol. 1 (2008)	Extra, Vol. 2 (2008)

Extra, Vol. 1 is a rarities double album by KMFDM. It was released on June 3, 2008. It is the first of a three volume, double-disc set collection of tracks that were not included in any of the ten KMFDM Classic albums.

== Release ==
These songs are absent from this volume: "Crazy Horses" a The Osmonds cover song, which was on the original release of the "Godlike (song)" single (CD ONLY) in 1990, as well as these 6 songs on the compilation album Agogo (album) (which in itself has never been re-released either): "Thank You"/ "Ooh La La"/"Mysterious Ways"/"Agogo", "Godlike (Chicago Trax version)", and "Hole in the Wall (Scott Burns remix)". None of the aforementioned songs have ever been re-released in any other format.

== Track listing ==
=== Disc one ===
No.	Title	Length
1.	"Sieg-Sieg" (Z-Records Version)	6:57
2.	"Don't Blow Your Top" (Adrian Sherwood Mix)	5:02
3.	"Disgust" (12" Mix)	4:33
4.	"Oh Look II"	2:42
5.	"Rip the System" (Original 12" Version)	3:34
6.	"More & Faster" (Original 12" Version)	3:31
7.	"Naff Off"	4:17
8.	"Virus" (Original 12" Version)	5:38
9.	"M + F 244" (High & Geil)	5:23
10.	"Godlike" (12" Mix)	6:34
11.	"Friede" (12" Mix)	4:45
12.	"Naïve" (My Life with the Thrill Kill Kult Remix)	10:27
13.	"Naïve 1991" (TKK Mix Edit)	4:21

=== Disc two ===
No.	Title	Length
1.	"Split" (Original 12" Version)	6:47
2.	"Piggybank" (Shock Version)	5:58
3.	"Go to Hell" (Fearing & Burning)	4:40
4.	"Vogue" (12" Mix)	5:30
5.	"Sex on the Flag" (12" Mix)	3:48
6.	"Split" (Apart Version)	4:28
7.	"Split" (Mirrorball Mix)	5:39
8.	"Money" (Radio Mix)	3:53
9.	"Bargeld" (Radio Mix)	4:02
10.	"Money" (Cover Charge Mix)	6:36
11.	"Bargeld" (Rubber Club Dub)	4:26
12.	"Money" (Metal Mix)	5:58
13.	"Bargeld" (Jezebeelzebuttfunk Mix)	5:46
14.	"Money" (Death Before Taxes Mix)	3:09
