= Beat Up =

Beat Up may refer to:

- Beat Up, a 1984 7" single album by American band The Toasters
- "Beat Up", a 2000 episode of Japanese television series Mirai Sentai Timeranger
- "Beat Up", a 2006 remix by German band KMFDM
- "Beat Up", a 2007 entry in Japanese manga series Petit Eva: Evangelion@School
- "Beat Up", a 2008 song by British band Mock & Toof
- "Beat Up", a song by American singer Izzy Stradlin on his 2010 album Wave of Heat

== See also ==
- Beat 'em up, a video game genre
- Upbeat (disambiguation)
- Beat It Up (disambiguation)
- Beat Me Up (disambiguation)
- Beat You Up (disambiguation)
- Up (disambiguation)
- Beat (disambiguation)
