= Retro (KMFDM album) =

Compilation album by KMFDM
- Released: 17 November 1998
- Genre: Industrial
- Length: 65:35
- Label: Wax Trax! Records/TVT Records

KMFDM compilations chronology
The Year of the Pig Collection (1995)	Retro (1998)	Agogo (1998)

Professional ratings
Review scores
Source	Rating
Allmusic	4.5/5 stars
Robert Christgau	(2-star Honorable Mention)

Retro (stylized as RETЯO) is a KMFDM compilation album featuring a sampling of the band's more popular songs. It was initially released in 1996 as a promotional item, and released for sale to the public in 1998.

== Track listing ==
No.	Title	Length
1.	"Power" (from Xtort)	5:26
2.	"Juke Joint Jezebel" (from Nihil)	5:40
3.	"Brute" (from Nihil)	4:25
4.	"A Drug Against War" (from Angst)	3:43
5.	"Light" (from Angst)	6:06
6.	"Money" (from Money)	5:27
7.	"Vogue" (from Money)	4:04
8.	"Godlike (Doglike Mix)" (from Naïve/Hell to Go)	5:37
9.	"Virus (Pestilence Mix)" (Naïve/Hell to Go)	5:07
10.	"Liebesleid/Leibeslied" (originally titled "Leibesleid (Infringement Mix)" from Naïve/Hell to Go)	4:38
11.	"More & Faster" (originally titled "More & Faster 243" from UAIOE)	2:53
12.	"Rip the System" (originally titled "Rip the System (Duck & Cover Mix)" from UAIOE)	3:16
13.	"What Do You Know?" (from What Do You Know, Deutschland?)	5:34
14.	"Don't Blow Your Top" (from Don't Blow Your Top)	3:39
