= Wurst =

Wurst may refer to:

- The ground (minced) meat product sausage
- The KMFDM compilation album Würst, released in 2010
- Conchita Wurst
