= OTWC =

OTWC may refer to:

- Oceanic Time Warner Cable, a Spectrum telecommunications brand in Hawaii
- OldTown White Coffee, a Malaysian restaurant chain
- Our Time Will Come (album), a 2014 album by KMFDM
- Our Time Will Come (film), 2017 Chinese war film
