= Don't Blow Your Top =

Don't Blow Your Top can refer to two different things:

- Don't Blow Your Top (album), a 1988 album by industrial band KMFDM.
- "Don't Blow Your Top" (song), the title track from the album of the same name.
