= Extra, Vol. 3 =

Compilation album by KMFDM
- Released: October 8, 2008
- Recorded: 1993–1997
- Genre: Industrial rock
- Label: Metropolis/KMFDM

KMFDM compilations chronology
Extra, Vol. 2 (2008)	Extra, Vol. 3 (2008)	Würst (2010)

Extra, Vol. 3 is a rarities double album by KMFDM. It was released on October 8, 2008. It is the last of a three volume, double-disc set collection of tracks that were not included in any of the ten KMFDM Classic albums. The song "Material Girl" is absent, and has never been re-released in any other format.

== Track listing ==
=== Disc one ===
No.	Title	Length
1.	"Move On" (Scott Burns Remix)	4:23
2.	"Glory" (Cajun Mix)	5:31
3.	"Juke-Joint Jezebel" (Single Mix)	4:09
4.	"Kraut"	4:57
5.	"Juke-Joint Jezebel" (Poly-Matrix Mix)	4:17
6.	"Juke-Joint Jezebel" (Metropolis Mix)	5:15
7.	"Juke-Joint Jezebel" (Paradox Mix)	4:27
8.	"Juke-Joint Jezebel" (Poly-Matrix X-tended Mix)	6:15
9.	"Juke-Joint Jezebel" (Poly-Matrix X-tended Mix Instrumental)	6:10
10.	"Brute" (Single Mix)	4:01
11.	"Brute" (Kun$t Mix)	4:15
12.	"Brute" (In Your Face Mix)	3:34
13.	"Brute" (Punch Mix)	4:16
14.	"Revolution II"	5:26

=== Disc two ===
No.	Title	Length
1.	"Son of a Gun" (Overhauled Mix)	3:40
2.	"Inane" (Undermined Mix)	8:27
3.	"Rules" (Reapplied Mix)	8:14
4.	"Power" (Single Mix)	3:38
5.	"Megalomaniac" (Single Mix)	4:19
6.	"Anarchy" (Payola Mix)	4:04
7.	"Megalomaniac" (Excessive Force Remix)	6:13
8.	"Anarchy" (Fusako Mix)	4:54
9.	"Megalomaniac" (Uxii Mix)	6:53
10.	"Unfit" (Death Before Taxes Mix)	5:46
11.	"Anarchy" (God and the State Mix)	5:45
12.	"Megalomaniac" (Tvva Mix)	7:37
