= Extra, Vol. 2 =

Compilation album by KMFDM
- Released: August 5, 2008
- Genre: Industrial rock
- Label: Metropolis/KMFDM

KMFDM compilations chronology
| Extra, Vol. 1 (2008) | Extra, Vol. 2 (2008) | Extra, Vol. 3 (2008) |

Extra, Vol. 2 is a rarities double album by KMFDM. It was released on August 5, 2008. It is the second of a three volume, double-disc set collection of tracks that were not included in any of the ten KMFDM Classic albums.

== Track listing ==
=== Disc one ===
| No. | Title | Length |
|---|---|---|
| 1. | "Help Us/Save Us/Take Us Away" (Weiner Mix) | 4:17 |
| 2. | "Help Us/Save Us/Take Us Away" (Jager Mix) | 5:24 |
| 3. | "Help Us/Save Us/Take Us Away" (Meister Mix) | 5:19 |
| 4. | "Help Us/Save Us/Take Us Away" (Oktoberfest Mix) | 5:14 |
| 5. | "Bargeld" (Cashflow Mix) | 6:20 |
| 6. | "Sucks" (No Shit Radio Mix) | 4:00 |
| 7. | "Sucks" (P-O-T-A-T-O Mix) | 3:43 |
| 8. | "Sucks" (Goodbye Barb Mix) | 5:20 |
| 9. | "Sucks" (12" Mix) | 4:01 |
| 10. | "More 'N' Faster" | 4:21 |
| 11. | "A Drug Against War" (Single Mix) | 3:43 |
| 12. | "A Drug Against War" (Overdose Mix) | 5:28 |
| 13. | "A Drug Against War" (Hookah Mix) | 3:36 |
| 14. | "Blood" (Single Mix) | 4:01 |

=== Disc two ===
| No. | Title | Length |
|---|---|---|
| 1. | "Light" (Cellulite Mix) | 3:49 |
| 2. | "Light" (Aerobic Mix) | 5:43 |
| 3. | "Light" (Rubber Gloves Dub Mix) | 5:25 |
| 4. | "Light" (Fat Back Mix) | 7:30 |
| 5. | "Light" (Vengeance Mix) | 5:39 |
| 6. | "Light" (Complete Orgasm Mix) | 5:00 |
| 7. | "Light" (Diet Mix) | 6:00 |
| 8. | "Light" (Lighthouse Mix) | 5:05 |
| 9. | "Light" (White Cotton Balls Mix) | 5:10 |
| 10. | "Trust" (Never Mix) | 4:37 |
| 11. | "Glory" (War & Slavery Dub) | 3:48 |
| 12. | "Lust" (Chem-lust Mix) | 5:28 |
| 13. | "Glory" (Exploitation Mix) | 4:02 |
