= Upbeat =

Up beat may refer to:

- Upbeat, in music, the last beat in the previous bar which immediately precedes the downbeat
- Anacrusis, a note (or sequence of notes) which precedes the first downbeat in a bar in a musical phrase
- Upbeat (album), by the Fred Frith Guitar Quartet, 1999
- Upbeat (TV program), an American musical show 1964–1971
- Upbeat Records, an independent record label
- The Upbeat, a Californian band

== See also ==
- Up (disambiguation)
- Beat (disambiguation)
- Beat Up (disambiguation)
