= Kickin' Ass =

Single by KMFDM
- Released: 1987
- Recorded: 1987
- Genre: Industrial rock
- Length: 12:22
- Label: Z, KMFDM
- Songwriter(s): Sascha Konietzko, Raymond Watts
- Producer(s): Sascha Konietzko

KMFDM singles chronology
"Kickin' Ass" (1987)	"Don't Blow Your Top" (1988)

"Kickin' Ass" is a song by industrial rock group KMFDM from their 1986 album What Do You Know, Deutschland?. All songs on the single are also on the 1991 and 2006 releases of the album. All tracks were recorded at Zitty Zound in Hamburg, Germany.

In 2008, KMFDM Records re-released this as a 7" vinyl single, limited to 250 copies. In 2010, the band released another version of the 7" release, also limited to 250 copies, which was sold with a bag that could hold all the 7" records from the complete 24/7 series of singles. This release featured a different colour scheme for the cover, and was pressed on red vinyl.

== Track listings ==
1987 release

No.	Title	Music	Length
1.	"Kickin' Ass"	Sascha Konietzko, Raymond Watts	4:01
2.	"Itchy Bitchy"	Jr. Blackmale, Konietzko, Watts	3:33
3.	"Lufthans"	Blackmale	4:48
Total length:			12:22

7" reissue

No.	Title	Length
1.	"Kickin' Ass"	4:01
2.	"Itchy Bitchy"	3:35
Total length:		7:36
