= Agogo (album) =

Compilation album by KMFDM
- Released: 17 November 1998
- Genre: Industrial
- Length: 42:24
- Label: Wax Trax! Records/TVT Records

KMFDM compilations chronology
Retro (1998)	Agogo (1998)	84–86 (2004)

Professional ratings
Review scores
Source	Rating
Allmusic	3/5 stars

Agogo is a rarities album by KMFDM. Agogo comprises numerous tracks either previously unreleased, released on other compilations, or otherwise not widely available. The only KMFDM album (from the so-called 'Classic' Era of 1984 to 1999) to never be re-released in any other way or format (including mp3), possibly due to copyright concerns.

== Track listing ==
No.	Title	Length
1.	"Thank You" (previously unreleased, originally to appear on the Apart album)	0:44
2.	"Godlike (Chicago Trax Version)" (originally from the first pressing of the Naïve album)	3:34
3.	"Virus (Dub)" (originally from the first pressing of the Naïve album)	6:25
4.	"Rip the System" (originally from the More & Faster single and limited editions of the UAIOE album)	3:34
5.	"Naff Off" (originally from the More & Faster single and limited editions of the UAIOE album)	4:17
6.	"Mysterious Ways" (U2 cover, originally from the Shut Up Kitty compilation)	3:10
7.	"Ooh La La" (originally from the Hellraiser III soundtrack)	4:02
8.	"Hole in the Wall (Scott Burns Remix)" (previously unreleased, originally to appear on the Glory single)	4:23
9.	"Agogo" (previously unreleased, originally recorded during the Money era)	7:01
10.	"Zip" (originally from the first pressing of the What Do You Know, Deutschland? album)	5:12
