= Split (KMFDM song) =

Single by KMFDM
- B-side: "Piggybank"
- Released: June 25, 1991
- Genre: Industrial
- Length: 22:00
- Label: Wax Trax!
- Songwriters: Sascha Konietzko, Klaus Schandelmaier, Günter Schulz

KMFDM singles chronology
"Naïve/The Days of Swine & Roses" (1991)	"Split" (1991)	"Vogue" (1992)

Professional ratings
Review scores
Source	Rating
AllMusic	3/5 stars

"Split" is a song by industrial rock band KMFDM, released in 1991 between their albums Naïve and Money. The song reached No. 46 on Billboard's Dance/Club Play Songs Chart in July 1991. The tracks on the single are also included on the singles compilation album, Extra, Vol. 1.

== Track listing ==
All songs written and composed by En Esch and Sascha Konietzko.

=== 1991 release ===
No.	Title	Length
1.	"Split"	6:56
2.	"Piggybank (Shock Version)"	6:00
3.	"Go to Hell (Fearing & Burning)" (not on 12")	4:44
4.	"Naïve 1991 (TKK Mix-Edit)" (not on 12")	4:20
Total length:		22:00

=== 2008 7" reissue ===
No.	Title	Length
1.	"Split (12" Mix)"	6:49
2.	"Go to Hell (Fearing & Burning Mix)"	4:40
Total length:		11:29

== Personnel ==
- Sascha Konietzko – vocals (1–4), bass, synths, programming (1–4)
- Günter Schulz – guitars (1–4)
- En Esch – vocals (1, 3, 4)
- Rudolph Naomi – drums (2–4)
- Christine Siewert – vocals (2–4)
- Dorona Alberti – vocals (1)
