= Beat It Up =

Beat It Up may refer to:

== Music ==
- Beat It Up! album by The Kaisers

=== Songs ===
- "Beat it Up", song by Gucci Mane from Burrrprint 2
- "Beat It Up", song by hip hop duo Big Tymers featuring Tateeze from album Big Money Heavyweight
- "Beat It Up", song by Keak da Sneak from Hi-Tek (album)
- "Beat It Up", single by Bertell Merovingian Music Twista discography 2010
- "Beat It Up", song by T. Mills featuring Juicy
- "Beat It Up", song by Kane & Abel from Rise to Power (Kane & Abel album)
- "Beat It Up", song by Bama Boyz from Meet the Bamaz (mixtape)
- "Beat It Up", song by Slim Thug featuring Dallas Blocker
- "Beat It Up", song by Bumpy Knuckles & Statik Selektah -Statik Selektah production discography
- "Make Her Say (Beat It Up)", song by Estelle from True Romance (Estelle album)
- "Whistle (Beat It Up)", song by Cakes da Killa
- "Beat it Upright", song by Korn from Untouchables (album)

== See also ==
- Beat Me Up (disambiguation)
- Beat You Up (disambiguation)
