= 84–86 =

2004 compilation album by KMFDM

84-86

Compilation album by KMFDM
- Released: October 11, 2004
- Recorded: 1984–1986
- Genre: Industrial
- Length: 98:14
- Label: KMFDM

KMFDM compilations chronology
Agogo (1998)	84-86 (2004)	Extra, Vol. 1 (2008)

84–86 is a double compilation album released by the industrial music band KMFDM in 2004. The album's 27 tracks on two compact discs were recorded from 1984 to 1986 but previously unreleased on CD. Certain noted selections have never been released at all prior to this album. Personnel featured on this recording include Sascha Konietzko, En Esch, Jr. Blackmail, Nico Blank, "Tamsi" Tamsjadi, and several others.

== Release ==
A cassette release of these tracks was assembled by En Esch and made available through the KMFDM Enterprises mailorder catalog in 1992. It included the first 19 tracks appearing on the CD release, but several tracks were dubbed at an incorrect tape speed (later fixed on the CD as "official" versions). These tracks were available for download at the KMFDM Store prior to the actual release of 84–86, limited to 1000 numbered copies. The CD was also sold on the band's 20th anniversary tour in October and November 2004, limited to an additional 1000 copies un-numbered.

== Track listing ==
=== Official release ===
Disc One
No.	Title	Length
1.	"Get It"	3:07
2.	"Disgusting Discovery"	4:12
3.	"Preisraetsel"	3:28
4.	"Don't Get Your" (previously unreleased "official" version)	5:48
5.	"Attention"	2:41
6.	"Moon"	2:26
7.	"Add"	4:51
8.	"#1 (Ichiban)"	2:46
9.	"TV-TV" (previously unreleased "official" version)	2:20
10.	"Too Much"	1:37
11.	"East German American Killed"	3:13
12.	"Fleisch Sehen"	3:11
13.	"I Can Absolutely Not" (previously unreleased "official" version)	4:02
14.	"Bewitched"	2:02
15.	"Indo" (previously unreleased "official" version)	3:31
16.	"Turn"	2:53

Disc Two
No.	Title	Length
1.	"Laminated Love"	2:39
2.	"To Sascha"	4:21
3.	"O.T."	1:53
4.	"Links In Die Ecke" (never before released)	5:28
5.	"Bad Turn" (never before released)	12:25
6.	"Very Bad Boys" (never before released)	2:57
7.	"TV-TV (Kopfschmerz variante)" (never before released)	2:25
8.	"Preisraetsel (Wuerstchen Mix)" (never before released)	4:03
9.	"Schnell Raus – kartoffein" (never before released)	2:10
10.	"Big Shit (Live@klecks, HH October 1985)" (never before released)	4:38
11.	"Liquid Pigs Under Pressure (Live @schwarzer Saal, Hannover May 1984)" (never before released)	3:07

=== 1992 KMFDM Enterprises mailorder cassette release ===
No.	Title	Length
1.	"Get It"	3:02
2.	"Disgusting Discovery"	4:13
3.	"Preisraetsel"	3:25
4.	"Don't Get Your"	3:18
5.	"Attention"	2:22
6.	"Moon"	2:22
7.	"Add"	4:50
8.	"#1"	2:44
9.	"TV-TV"	2:09
10.	"Too Much"	1:31
11.	"East German American Killed"	3:15
12.	"Fleisch Sehen"	3:10
13.	"I Can Absolutely Not"	3:44
14.	"Bewitched"	2:01
15.	"Indo"	4:16
16.	"Turn"	2:48
17.	"Laminated Love"	2:33
18.	"To Sascha"	4:23
19.	"O.T."	1:48

Note: Tracks 3, 4, 9, and 13 are different versions on the cassette than on the official CD release.

== Personnel ==
- Sascha Konietzko
- En Esch
- Rudolf Naomi
- Nico Blank
- Sintawati Tamsjadi
- Jr. Blackmail
- Tom Oz
- Willi Knop
- EASi
