= More & Faster =

Single by KMFDM
- Released: June 1989
- Genre: Industrial dance
- Length: 11:16
- Label: Wax Trax!
- Songwriter(s): Sascha Konietzko, Klaus Schandelmaier
- Producer(s): F. M. Einheit

KMFDM singles chronology
"Don't Blow Your Top" (1988)	"More & Faster" (1989)	"Virus" (1989)

Professional ratings
Review scores
Source	Rating
Chicago Tribune	3/4 stars

"More & Faster" is a KMFDM single released in 1989. The songs on this release also appeared on some European versions of UAIOE, and alternate versions of "More & Faster" and "Rip the System" both appeared on UAIOE. "More & Faster" later appeared on Virus, and "Rip the System" and "Naff Off" later appeared on the rarities collection Agogo. In 2008, KMFDM Records re-released this as a 7" vinyl single, limited to 250 copies.

== Reception ==
Tom Popson of the Chicago Tribune said the song's vocals "actually exhibit some feeling-a bit of a novelty in a field where the singing often tends toward flat-toned, apocalyptic-doom stylings." Andy Hinds of Allmusic called it "probably the first KMFDM classic".

== Track list ==
=== Original 1989 release ===
No.	Title	Length
1.	"More & Faster"	3:30
2.	"Rip the System"	3:30
3.	"Naff Off"	4:16
Total length:		11:16

=== 2008 7" reissue ===
No.	Title	Length
1.	"Rip the System"	3:32
2.	"More & Faster"	3:34
Total length:		7:06
