= Enemy (KMFDM album) =

Studio album by KMFDM
- Released: 6 February 2026
- Genre: Electro-industrial, industrial rock, industrial metal
- Length: 44:40
- Label: Metropolis

KMFDM chronology
Let Go (2024)	Enemy (2026)

Enemy is the 23rd studio album by German industrial band KMFDM. It was released on 6 February 2026.

== Reception ==
Professional ratings
Review scores
Source	Rating
Blabbermouth.net	8/10
Sputnikmusic	3.4/5
Spill Magazine	7/10

Enemy received mostly favorable reviews. Dom Lawson of Blabbermouth.net called it "one of their strongest and most wildly entertaining efforts to date". Trista Whitman of Spill magazine said Enemy "remains consistent with the KMFDM concept while showcasing impressive versatility in sound". Raul Stanciu of Sputnikmusic was less enthusiastic, saying that "Enemy boasts the features long-time fans will be happy to hear again" but also commenting that "the second half quickly loses momentum".

== Track listing ==
All tracks written by KMFDM except where noted.

No.	Title	Writer(s)	Length
1.	"Enemy"		4:19
2.	"Oubliette"		4:22
3.	"L’état"		4:02
4.	"Vampyr"		3:39
5.	"Yoü"		4:10
6.	"Outernational Intervention"		3:50
7.	"A Okay"		3:23
8.	"Stray Bullet 2.0"		4:17
9.	"Catch & Kill"		3:59
10.	"Gun Quarter Sue"		4:07
11.	"The Second Coming"	William Butler Yeats	4:26
Total length:			44:40

== Personnel ==
- Sascha Konietzko
- Lucia Cifarelli
- Andy Selway
- Tidor Nieddu
- Annabella Konietzko
