= Beat You Up =

Beat You Up may refer to:

- "Beat You Up", a song by The Prissteens from Jawbreaker (film), 1999
- "Beat You Up", a song from Killer (Tech N9ne album), 2008

== See also ==
- Beat It Up (disambiguation)
- Beat Me Up (disambiguation)
