= Beat Me Up =

Beat Me Up may refer to:

- "Beat Me Up", a song from Just Like You (Allison Iraheta album), 2006
- "Beat Me Up", a song from Afraid of Heights (Wavves album), 2013

== See also ==
- Beat Me, a 2006 album by Electric Eel Shock
- Beat It Up (disambiguation)
- Beat You Up (disambiguation)
