= Hell Yeah (KMFDM album) =

Studio album by KMFDM
- Released: 18 August 2017
- Genre: Industrial rock, electro-industrial, industrial
- Length: 51:14
- Label: earMUSIC/KMFDM
- Producer: Sascha Konietzko

KMFDM chronology
Our Time Will Come (2014)	Hell Yeah (2017)	Paradise (2019)

Professional ratings
Review scores
Source	Rating
AllMusic	3.5/5 stars
Blabbermouth.net	8/10
PopMatters	5/10 stars

Hell Yeah is the 19th album by industrial band KMFDM. It was released on earMUSIC and KMFDM Records on 18 August 2017.

== Track listing ==
All tracks are written by Sascha Konietzko unless otherwise indicated.

No.	Title	Writer(s)	Length
1.	"Hell Yeah"		5:06
2.	"Freak Flag"	Lucia Cifarelli, Sascha Konietzko	4:50
3.	"Oppression 1/2"		0:42
4.	"Total State Machine"		4:24
5.	"Oppression 2/2"		0:31
6.	"Murder My Heart"	Cifarelli, Konietzko	4:28
7.	"Rip the System v. 2.0"		4:50
8.	"Shock"	Cifarelli, Konietzko	4:34
9.	"Fake News"		4:21
10.	"Rx 4 the Damned"	Cifarelli, Konietzko, Doug Wimbish	3:41
11.	"Burning Brain"		4:42
12.	"Only Lovers"	Cifarelli, Konietzko	4:02
13.	"Glam Glitz Guts & Gore"		5:03
Total length:			51:14

== Personnel ==
All information from CD booklet.

- Sascha Konietzko – bass (1–9, 11–13), drums (1–5, 7, 9–13), synths (1–13), vocals (1–2, 4–13)
- Lucia Cifarelli – vocals (2, 5, 6, 8–10, 12)
- Andy Selway – toms (1), drums (2, 4, 6, 8–9, 11–13)

=== Guest musicians ===
- Anabella Asia – spoken word (1), synth solo (10)
- Gared Dirge – Hammond B3 (6)
- Chris Harms – guitars (1–2, 4, 6–13), vocals (4, 13)
- Mika Harms – spoken word (1)
- Jules Hodgson – guitars (1)
- Abby Martin – spoken word (3)
- Doug Wimbish – bass (10)
- Sin Quirin – guitars (13)

== Charts ==
Chart (2017)	Peak position
US Top Dance Albums (Billboard)	14
