= Virus (KMFDM song) =

Single by KMFDM
- Released: August 1989
- Recorded: 1988–1989
- Genre: Industrial, industrial metal
- Length: 18:19
- Label: Wax Trax! Records
- Songwriters: Sascha Konietzko, Klaus Schandelmaier, Günter Schulz
- Producers: Adrian Sherwood, Sascha Konietzko

KMFDM singles chronology
"More & Faster" (1989)	"Virus" (1989)	"Godlike" (1990)

Professional ratings
Review scores
Source	Rating
Allmusic	3/5 stars

"Virus" is a KMFDM song from their fifth album, Naïve. In 2008, KMFDM Records re-released this as a 7" vinyl single, limited to 250 copies. The album version is considered a remix, entitled "Virus (Dub)", making the single version the original version. The "Pestilence Mix" was included on the soundtrack to the 1995 film Johnny Mnemonic.

== Reception ==
The original four track EP was called "easily their strongest" in 1996. AllMusic's Johnny Loftus described the title track as "innocent new wave gone very naughty in a PVC hell." Eric Olsen called the song one of industrial's best, with the same "razor-sharp guitars, hummable tune, clever lyrics, and danceable beat in the funky-to-brutal range" as many of the band's other songs.

== Track listing ==
Wax Trax! Records version
No.	Title	Length
1.	"Virus"	5:40
2.	"More & Faster" (only on CD)	3:35
3.	"Don't Blow Your Top" (only on CD)	3:41
4.	"High & Geil"	5:23
Total length:		18:19

Deutschland Strikeback Records version
No.	Title	Length
1.	"Virus"	5:40
2.	"Murder"	3:26
3.	"M & F 244 (High & Geil)"	5:21
Total length:		14:27

Promotional Cash Beat Records version
No.	Title	Length
1.	"Virus"	5:35
2.	"M + F 244 (High & Geil)"	5:21
Total length:		10:56

2008 7" reissue
No.	Title	Length
1.	"Virus (12" Mix)"	5:36
2.	"More & Faster (High & Geil Mix)"	5:22
Total length:		10:58
