= Our Time Will Come (album) =

Studio album by KMFDM
- Released: 14 October 2014
- Genre: Industrial metal, electro-industrial
- Length: 48:23
- Label: Metropolis/KMFDM
- Producer: Lucia Cifarelli, Sascha Konietzko

KMFDM chronology
Kunst (2013)	Our Time Will Come (2014)	Hell Yeah (2017)

Professional ratings
Review scores
Source	Rating
AllMusic	3.5/5 stars
Sputnikmusic	3.0/5
PopMatters	6.0/10 stars

Our Time Will Come is the 18th album from German industrial rock band KMFDM. It was released on 14 October 2014 on Metropolis/KMFDM Records on both CD and vinyl.

== Track listing ==
No.	Title	Writer(s)	Length
1.	"Genau"	Sascha Konietzko	5:14
2.	"Shake the Cage"	Lucia Cifarelli, Jules Hodgson, Konietzko	4:51
3.	"Respekt"	Konietzko, Tom Stanzel	5:18
4.	"Our Time Will Come"	Cifarelli, Hodgson, Konietzko, Andy Selway	4:35
5.	"Salvation"	Cifarelli, Konietzko	5:33
6.	"Blood vs. Money"	Konietzko	3:53
7.	"Get the Tongue Wet"	Cifarelli, Konietzko, Steve White	3:47
8.	"Brainwashed"	Hodgson, Konietzko	4:22
9.	"Playing God"	Cifarelli, Konietzko	4:29
10.	"Make Your Stand"	Paul Aleinikoff, Konietzko, Stanzel, William Wilson	6:21
Total length:			48:23

== Personnel ==
=== KMFDM ===
- Lucia Cifarelli – composition, production
- Jules Hodgson – composition, engineering, mixing
- Sascha Konietzko – composition, engineering, mixing, production
- Andy Selway – composition
- Steve White – composition

=== Additional personnel ===
- Paul Aleinikoff – composition
- Annabella Asia – vocals (1)
- Bradley Bills – drums (3, 7), percussion (3, 7)
- Mickie D (Michael Duwe) – solo guitar (5)
- Justin Gammon – layout
- Brian Gardner – mastering
- Tom Stanzel – bass (3, 10), composition, drums (3, 10), engineering, mixing, synthesizer (3, 10), vocals (3)
- William Wilson – composition, engineering, mixing, vocals (10)

== Salvation ==
"Salvation"

Single by KMFDM
- Released: June 10, 2015
- Recorded: 2014
- Genre: Industrial rock, electro-industrial, Alternative Rock
- Label: Metropolis, KMFDM
- Songwriters: Lucia Cifarelli, Sascha Konietzko
- Producer: KMFDM

KMFDM singles chronology
"Amnesia" (2012)	"Salvation" (2015)	"Yeah!" (2017)

"Salvation" is a song by industrial band KMFDM from their album Our Time Will Come.

== Track listing ==
No.	Title	Writer(s)	Remixer	Length
1.	"Salvation (Album Version)"	Cifarelli, Konietzko	KMFDM	5:33
2.	"Blood Vs. Money (Chant)"	Konietzko	Chant	4:33
3.	"Salvation (Mindless Self Indulgence)"	Cifarelli, Konietzko	Mindless Self Indulgence	3:58
4.	"Brainwashed (KMFDM)"	Hodgson, Konietzko	KMFDM	3:50
5.	"Salvation (Dope Stars Inc.)"	Cifarelli, Konietzko	Dope Stars Inc.	4:46
6.	"Blood Vs. Money (Tritoxin)"	Konietzko	Tritoxin	5:08
Total length:				27:51
