= KMFDM =

German industrial band

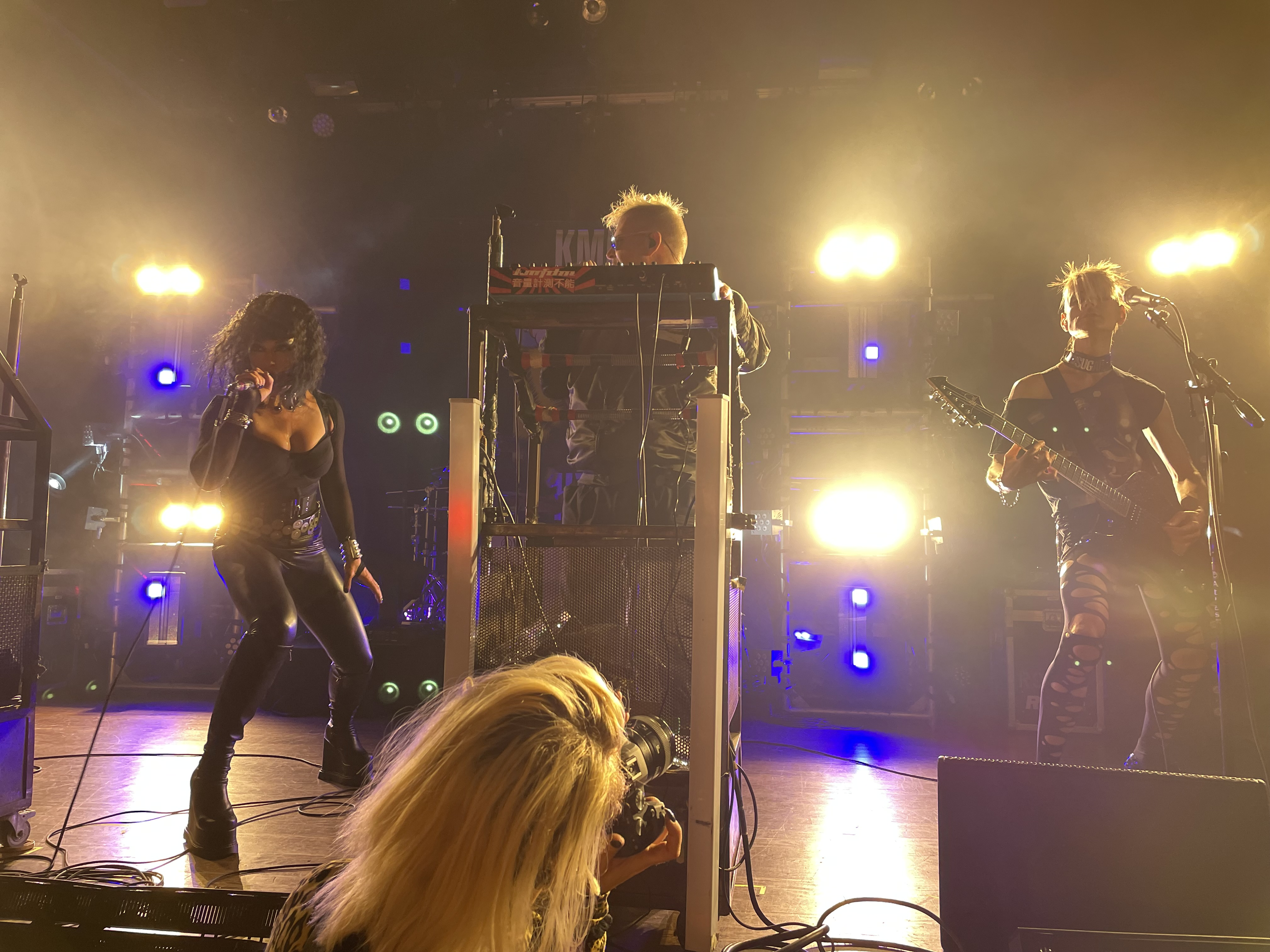
- KMFDM live in 2022

Background information
- Origin: Hamburg, Germany
- Genres: Industrial rock; industrial metal; electro-industrial
- Years active: 1984–1999; 2002–present
- Labels: KMFDM; Metropolis; Z; Skysaw; Wax Trax!; Sanctuary; TVT
- Spinoffs: Excessive Force
- Members: Sascha Konietzko; Lucia Cifarelli; Andy Selway; Tidor Nieddu
- Past members: Rudolph Naomi; Jennifer Ginsberg; Mark Durante; Günter Schulz; En Esch; Tim Sköld; Bill Rieflin; Raymond Watts; Steve White; Jules Hodgson; Andee Blacksugar
- Website: kmfdm.net

KMFDM (originally Kein Mehrheit Für Die Mitleid, loosely translated by the band as "No Pity for the Majority") is a multinational industrial band from Hamburg led by Sascha Konietzko, who founded the band in 1984 as a performance art project.

The band's earliest incarnation included German drummer En Esch and British vocalist Raymond Watts, with Watts leaving and rejoining the group several times over its history. The trio recorded the band's earliest albums in Germany before Konietzko and Esch moved to the United States, where they found much greater success with seminal industrial record label Wax Trax!. German guitarist Günter Schulz joined in 1990. Both he and Esch continued with the band until KMFDM broke up in 1999. In 2002, Konietzko resurrected KMFDM on Metropolis Records. Esch and Schulz declined to rejoin.

By 2005, Konietzko had assembled a consistent line-up that included American singer Lucia Cifarelli (whom he married), British guitarists Jules Hodgson and Steve White, and British drummer Andy Selway. In 2007, Konietzko and Cifarelli moved back to Germany, while the rest of the band stayed in the U.S. Hodgson and White moved on to other pursuits between 2015 and 2017, leaving the band a working trio unofficially. In addition to these core members, dozens of other musicians have worked with the group across its twenty-two studio albums and over two dozen singles, with sales totaling in excess of two million records worldwide.

Critics consider KMFDM one of the first bands to bring industrial music to mainstream audiences, though Konietzko refers to the band's music as "The Ultra-Heavy Beat". The band incorporates heavy metal guitar riffs, electronic music, samples, and both male and female vocals in its music, which encompasses a variety of styles including industrial metal and electronic body music. The band is fiercely political, with many of its lyrics taking stands against violence, war, and oppression. KMFDM normally tours at least once after every major release, and band members are known for their accessibility to and interaction with fans, both online and at concerts. Members, independently or working together and with other musicians, have recorded under many other names, primarily Watts' Pig, Konietzko's Excessive Force, and Esch and Schulz's Slick Idiot.

== History ==
=== Origin (1984) ===
KMFDM was officially founded in Paris, France, on February 29, 1984, as a performance art project between Sascha Konietzko and German painter and multimedia artist Udo Sturm at the opening of an exhibition of young European artists at the Grand Palais. The first show consisted of Sturm playing an ARP 2600 synthesizer, Konietzko playing bass guitars with their amplifiers spread throughout the building, and four Polish coal miners (whom Konietzko had met at a bordello) pounding on the foundations of the Grand Palais.

==== Name ====
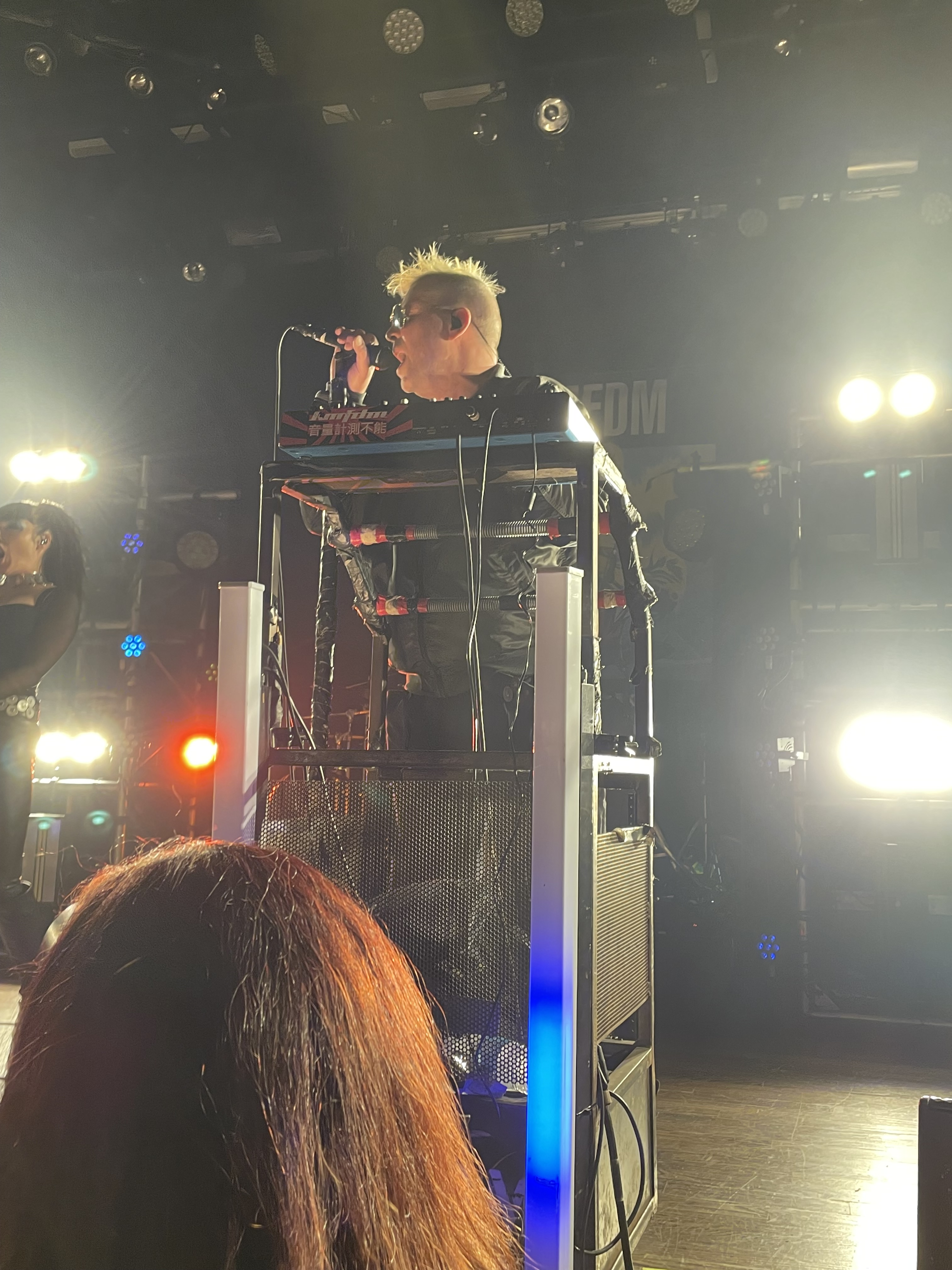
Sascha Konietzko performing in 2022

KMFDM is an initialism for the nonsensical and grammatically incorrect German phrase Kein Mehrheit Für Die Mitleid, which, keeping the same word order, literally translates as "no majority for the pity", but is typically given the loose translation of "no pity for the majority". In the original phrase, the articles preceding the nouns Mehrheit and Mitleid are inflected for the wrong gender, as the proper declension would be Keine Mehrheit für das Mitleid. Swapping the two nouns yields the grammatically correct Kein Mitleid für die Mehrheit, which translates directly as "no pity for the majority".

The initialism has jokingly been said to stand for "Kill Mother-Fucking Depeche Mode", coined by the band on their first U.S. tour and used as recently as the album Kunst, where a lyric referencing this is in the titular track.

=== Early years in Germany (1984–1989) ===
Sturm left early on, but Konietzko continued performing, at one point having twenty people in his troupe, which by then was engaged in antics such as fire eating and throwing entrails at audiences. Konietzko then returned to Hamburg, where he joined up with Peter Missing in his new band Missing Foundation. Drummer Nicklaus Schandelmaier, who had recently moved to Hamburg from Frankfurt, joined the group, and took the stage name En Esch. Although the group did some live performances, Konietzko and Esch dropped out of Missing Foundation before any recordings were made and went back to work as KMFDM, collaborating with Hamburg-based studio owner Raymond Watts.

Cassette copies of the band's demo album, Opium, began circulating through the underground clubs and bars of Hamburg in 1984. KMFDM released its debut album, What Do You Know, Deutschland?, in December 1986. It was recorded from 1983 to 1986, with some of the songs recorded by Konietzko and Watts before Esch was a member of the band, and indeed, before the band officially existed. Skysaw Records gave the album a second UK release in 1987 and introduced the band to visual artist Aidan Hughes, usually credited as Brute! Hughes redesigned the album's cover, and went on to design almost every KMFDM album cover.

Watts left the group after working on just three songs on 1988's Don't Blow Your Top to start his own project, Pig. After working the Hamburg underground music scene and releasing albums on European labels, the band began its long-standing relationship with Wax Trax! Records when Don't Blow Your Top was licensed to the label for US distribution. The album was produced by Adrian Sherwood, and was described by AllMusic critic Dave Thompson as "[highlighting] the producer as much as the band".

=== Success in the US (1990–1994) ===
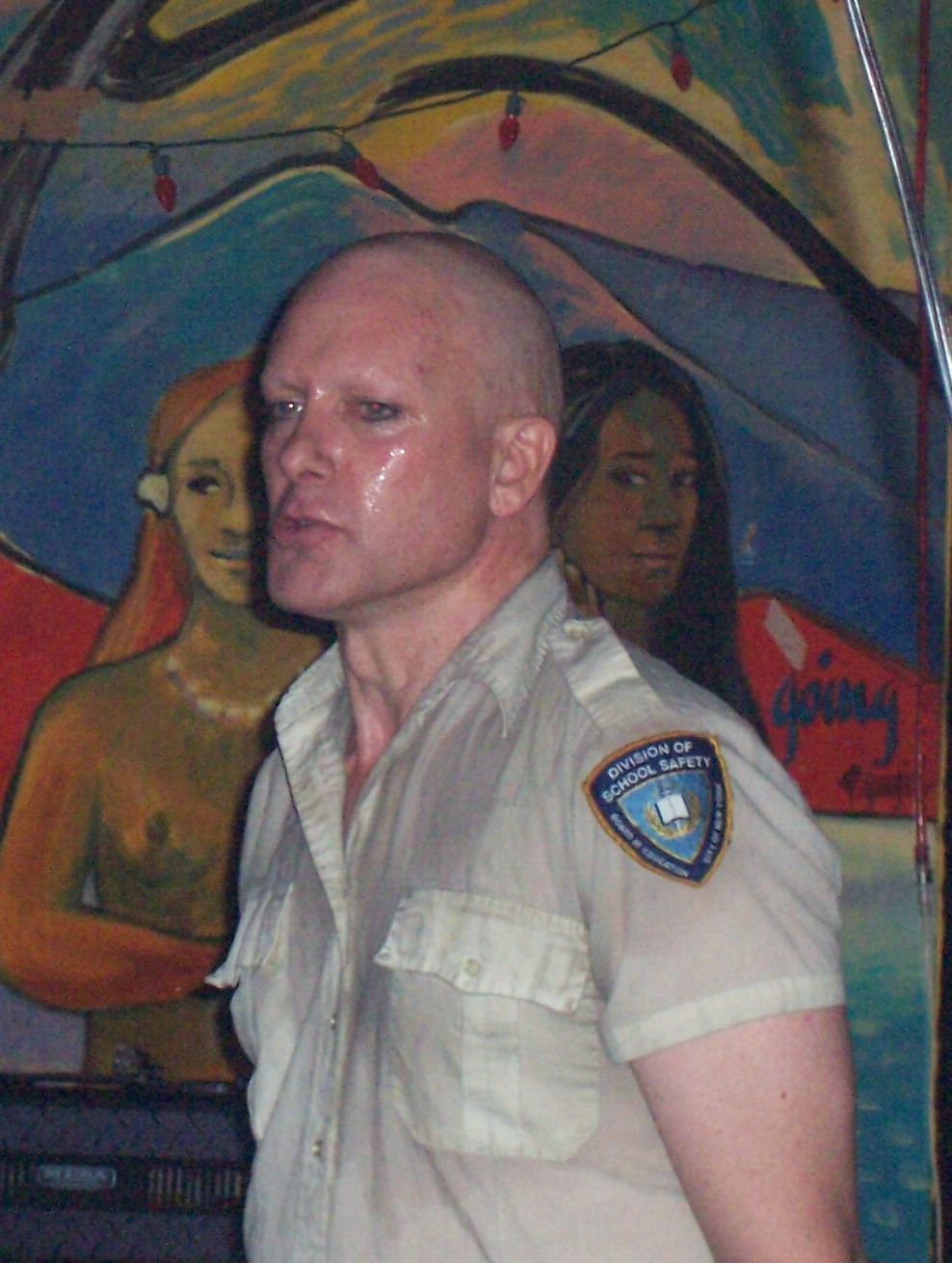
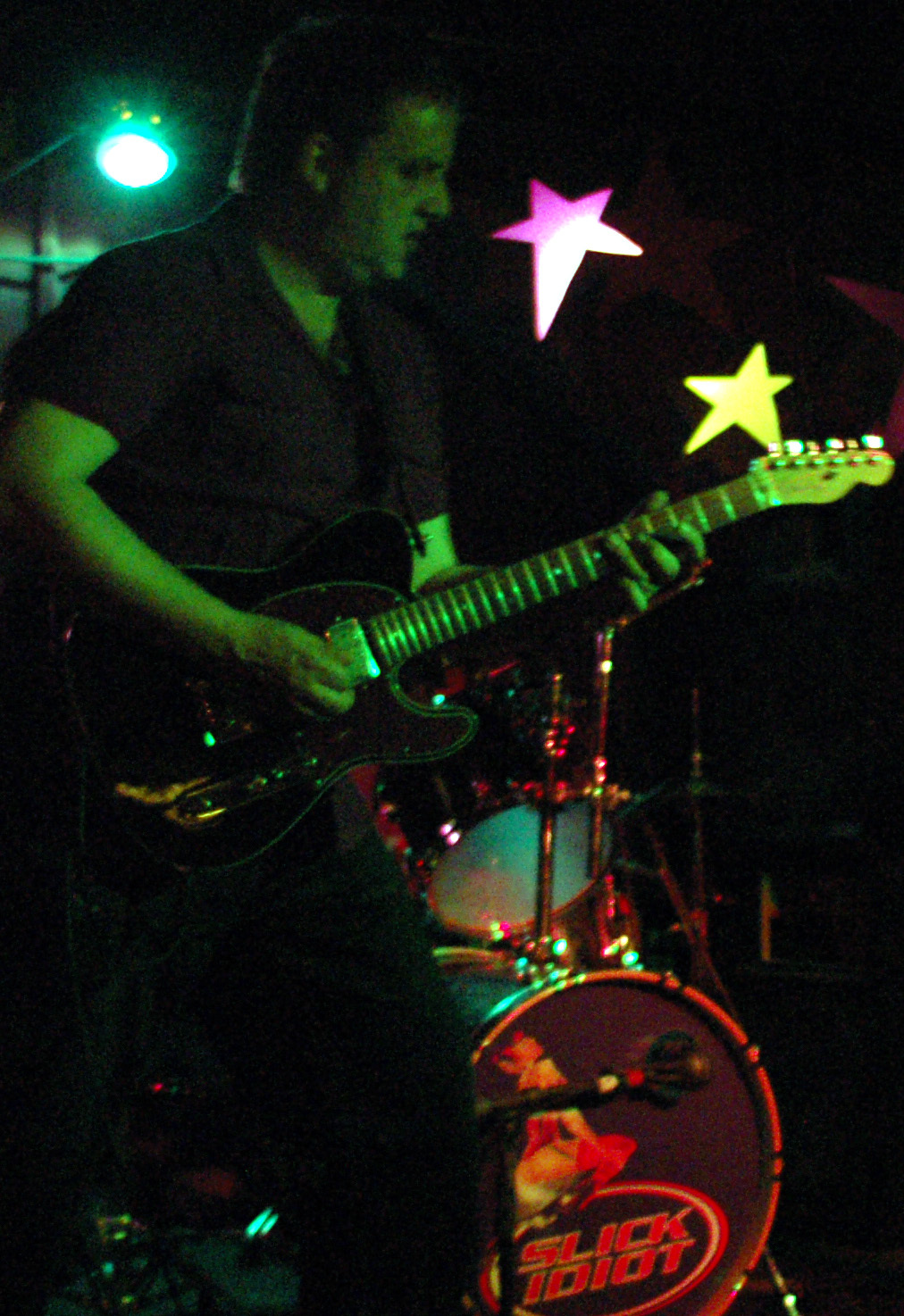
En Esch and Günter Schulz were instrumental in the success of the band in the 1990s.

"More & Faster 243"
The chorus of "More & Faster 243" off UAIOE, a song called KMFDM's "first classic" which "shows some early glimpses of the band's sense of humor"

KMFDM recorded and released its third album, UAIOE, in early 1989 for distribution in both the U.S. and Europe, arrived in America for the first time on December 16, and commenced touring the U.S. with Ministry. During KMFDM's first US tour, band members started using the phrase "Kill Motherfucking Depeche Mode" for the initialism to tease journalists who did not understand German. The band signed directly to Wax Trax! to distribute its fourth album, Naïve, which was recorded in Europe and featured the debut of guitarist Günter Schulz, known at the time as Svetlana Ambrosius. A remix of the album's title track was the group's first hit, reaching No. 21 on Billboard's Dance/Club Play Songs Chart in March 1991.

Konietzko moved to Chicago in 1991, and Esch followed a year later. KMFDM quickly became a part of the Chicago industrial music scene that included Ministry, My Life with the Thrill Kill Kult, and Revolting Cocks. Konietzko later remarked, "We came from Germany and we all had to have day jobs and work our asses off to afford to be KMFDM and all of a sudden we're in the states and we're selling thousands of thousands of [sic] fucking records!"

The band's next club hit was "Split", which was released in June 1991 and reached No. 46 on Billboard's Dance/Club Play Songs Chart in July. During 1991, Konietzko collaborated with Buzz McCoy of My Life With the Thrill Kill Kult to record an album under the name Excessive Force titled Conquer Your World. Konietzko and Esch then began work on their halves of the intended fifth album, Apart, which was eventually released as two separate albums. Esch's half became his solo album, Cheesy, while the official KMFDM album used Konietzko's material and was renamed Money. This album spawned two more club hits in 1992: "Vogue", which reached No. 19 on the Billboard Dance/Club Play Songs Chart in April, and the title track, which reached No. 36 on that same chart in July.

After touring in 1992 with drummer Chris Vrenna, the then-core of KMFDM (Konietzko, Esch, Schulz, and second guitarist Mark Durante) returned to Chicago and found that Wax Trax! had filed Chapter 11 bankruptcy to begin corporate reorganization in November 1992. The band went into the studio in 1993 as a group to record its sixth album, Angst, which sold more than 100,000 copies over the next two years.

Esch said after the album's release, "I like this album way more. Money was done in a hurry, and I was doing a major Pigface tour, so I didn't have much influence on the album. I really like Angst. I'm totally down with it. We've tried to involve guitar players, we tried to be like a real band, especially in the creative kind of aspect." After the release of Angst, Wax Trax!/TVT Records launched a promotion in which fans were encouraged to devise as many alternate meanings for KMFDM as possible, with more than a thousand submissions resulting.

Konietzko released a second album under the Excessive Force moniker in 1993 titled Gentle Death. KMFDM received its first exposure to the mainstream with its single "A Drug Against War". Despite the band's anti-MTV stance, the video of "A Drug Against War" received airplay on MTV and was shown on the MTV cartoon Beavis and Butt-head. The track "Light" reached No. 31 on the Billboard Dance/Club Play Songs Chart in May 1994.

The song "Liebeslied" from Naïve originally contained an unlicensed sample of "O Fortuna" from Carl Orff's Carmina Burana. Orff's publisher threatened the band with legal action, and the album was withdrawn from production in 1993. A new version of the album, titled Naïve/Hell to Go, was released the following year. It contained new mixes of several songs, including a version of "Liebeslied" with the offending sample removed.

Wax Trax! was saved from bankruptcy by an infusion of funds from TVT Records, and in March 1994 announced plans to release the compilation set Black Box – Wax Trax! Records: The First 13 Years, which includes the KMFDM songs "Virus" and "Godlike", two songs which Thompson called "defining".

=== Peak popularity (1994–1999) ===
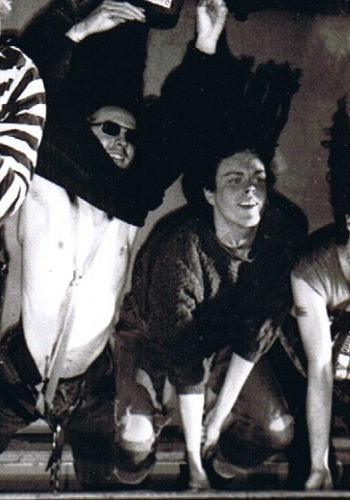
Chris Connelly (right) and Nivek Ogre in 1991. Both contributed guest vocals for KMFDM in the 1990s.

The mid-to-late 1990s were KMFDM's most successful years in terms of album sales and mainstream awareness. Konietzko moved to Seattle in 1994, while Esch moved to New Orleans. Watts rejoined the band to work on its seventh album, Nihil, which peaked at No. 16 on the Billboard Heatseekers chart and sold 209,000 copies, making it the band's best-selling album. It marked the first contributions by drummer Bill Rieflin, who worked with the band on its next five albums. Nihil featured KMFDM's most widely known song, "Juke Joint Jezebel", versions of which appeared on both the Bad Boys and Mortal Kombat soundtracks, the latter of which peaked at No. 10 on the Billboard 200 and sold over 1.8 million copies. Their song "Ultra" was used in the English version of Street Fighter II: The Animated Movie.

Commenting on the rotating cast of musicians shortly after Nihil's release, Konietzko said, "It's as if En and I are the suns and the other musicians at the time come and revolve around us." Regarding the duo's dynamic, Konietzko said, "En Esch and myself have always been the cornerstone of KMFDM's existence. And we are diametrically opposed as writers. The angsty stuff generally comes from him. The poppy, hard stuff comes from me." Esch commented in 1994, "Sascha and myself are different, of course. But that's why we can still make things happen. Our best and worst qualities are contrary. To put it simply, he's more organized and stable, I'm more complicated and abstract."

"Juke Joint Jezebel"
The "snarling guitars [wrapped] in spiky synth barbed wire" and "swooping, gospelish chorus" from "Juke Joint Jezebel", KMFDM's biggest "hit"

"Power"
Konietzko wrote the "dumb and catchy" song to satisfy the label's demand for a song for radio play, but hired Cheryl Wilson to lend "soul-mama vamping" to the chorus because he had heard "radio didn't like big female choruses".

In late 1995, close friend and president of Chicago's Wax Trax! Jim Nash died of an illness complicated by AIDS, and Seattle became the official headquarters of KMFDM. Watts toured with KMFDM throughout 1995 in support of Nihil, but then left the group to return to recording under the Pig moniker. Esch separated from the group, and Xtort was created in 1996 almost entirely without his input. Konietzko instead brought in a number of other industrial artists such as Chris Connelly to assist with the album.

Xtort was the first KMFDM album to chart on the Billboard 200 and the highest-charting album in the band's history, reaching No. 92 and selling more than 200,000 copies. "Power", the album's first single, was the most heavily promoted song in the band's history, with almost 100,000 copies included in a free Wax Trax! sampler album in mid-1996. Konietzko later said Xtort was his favorite album of the 1990s.

Esch returned for the Symbols album, which was released in 1997 and featured Abby Travis and Skinny Puppy's Nivek Ogre. Symbols reached No. 137 on the Billboard 200. Its first track, "Megalomaniac", was featured in the film Mortal Kombat Annihilation, and was the first song from its soundtrack to receive radio airplay. Tim Skold, formerly of the band Shotgun Messiah, made his first appearance as a band member, writing lyrics and performing vocals on "Anarchy".

Looking back on Symbols in 2002, Konietzko said, "I listened to the Symbols album and heard exactly why KMFDM broke up in the first place. It told me the story of what went wrong. There were maybe two (good) songs on that album and the others were just a bunch of compromising tug-of-wars. That was something I was not going to do again."

The band released a pair of compilation albums in 1998. The first, Retro, was a greatest hits compilation which included most of the singles released up until Xtort. The second, Agogo, was a collection of rarities and previously unreleased tracks, including a cover of U2's "Mysterious Ways".

=== Adios (1999) and the Columbine High School massacre ===
The album Adios was written and performed almost exclusively by Konietzko and Skold. Ogre again provided vocals, as did German musician Nina Hagen. Originally the fulfillment of the band's ten record contract with Wax Trax!/TVT, Adios later signaled the breakup of the band itself, which Esch's and Schulz's limited participation foreshadowed.

KMFDM disbanded, albeit temporarily, on January 22, 1999, with only Konietzko and Skold remaining together. Konietzko said the split was due to "lots of stress and pressure, as well as differences in vision and drive". Esch said "There was a lot of negative energy between Sascha and Günter Schulz and myself and we all decided on the phone to call the band quits." Adios was released three months later, and reached No. 189 on the Billboard 200. Its title track was called "a bitter goodbye".

In the wake of the Columbine High School massacre, it was revealed that lyrics to KMFDM songs ("Son of a Gun", "Stray Bullet", "Waste") were posted on the website of shooter Eric Harris, and that the date of the massacre, April 20, coincided with both the release date of the album Adios and the birthday of Adolf Hitler. Some journalists were quick to jump on the possibility that the actions of Harris and the other shooter, Dylan Klebold, were inspired by the violent entertainment and Nazism, though one wrote, "Lyrically, the band has written some songs that could easily be misconstrued by anyone lacking an ear for irony and looking for an excuse to commit violence." In response, Konietzko issued a statement:

"First and foremost, KMFDM would like to express their deep and heartfelt sympathy for the parents, families and friends of the murdered and injured children in Littleton. We are sick and appalled, as is the rest of the nation, by what took place in Colorado yesterday."

"KMFDM are an art form—not a political party. From the beginning, our music has been a statement against war, oppression, fascism and violence against others. While some of the former band members are German as reported in the media, none of us condone any Nazi beliefs whatsoever."

=== MDFMK, Slick Idiot, and reformation (2000–2002) ===
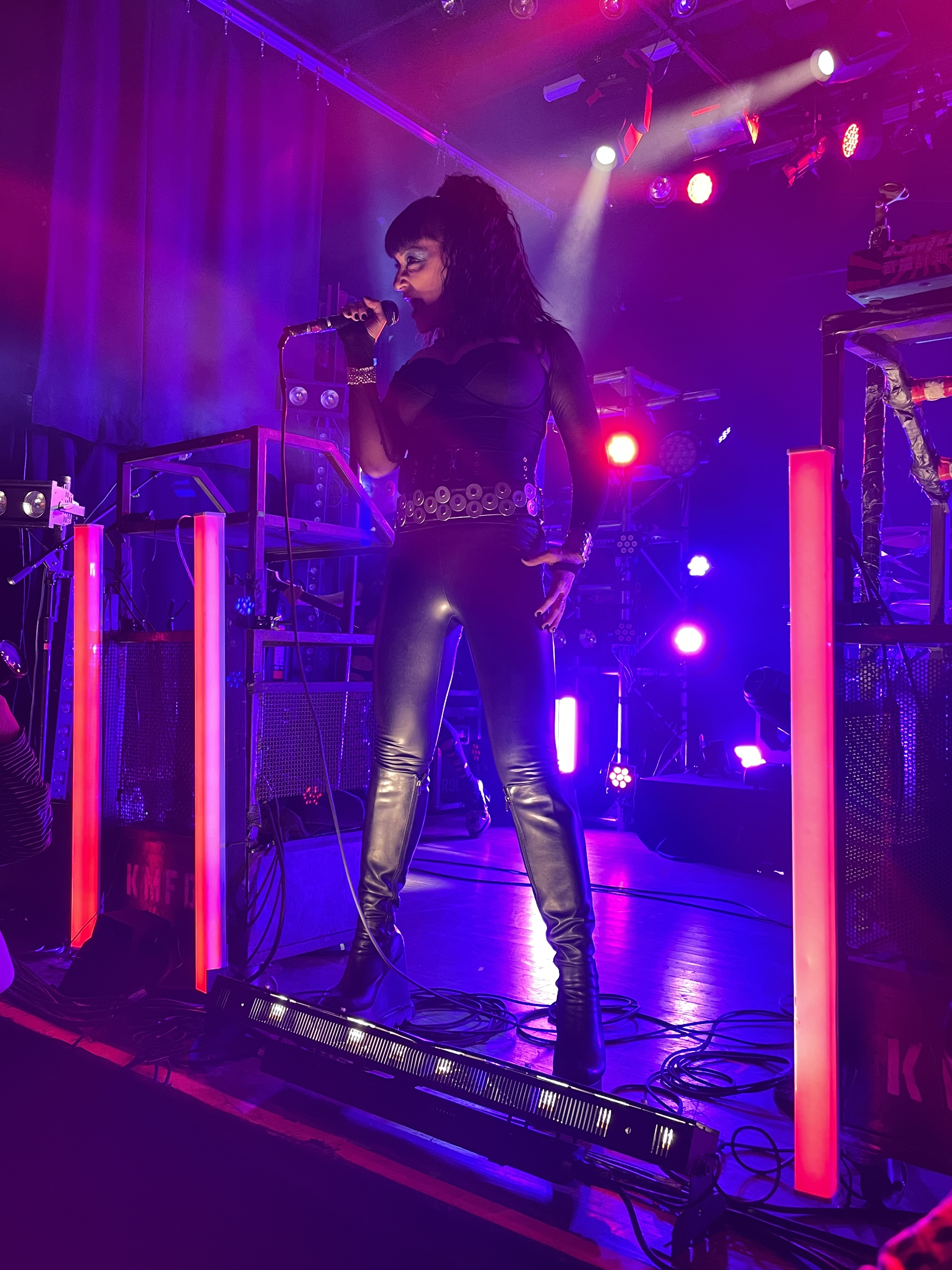
Lucia Cifarelli performing in New York, New York, in October 2022

After the group disbanded, Schulz and Esch formed the band Slick Idiot, while Konietzko and Skold regrouped as MDFMK, adding singer Lucia Cifarelli to form a trio. MDFMK released one self-titled album with Republic/Universal Records, and toured North America. After being released from his contract with Universal due to a disagreement over who would produce the next album, Konietzko said he called Metropolis Records and asked if they'd be interested in signing KMFDM. The label agreed, although at the time only Konietzko himself was certain to participate.

Konietzko announced the return of KMFDM in early 2001, due to "public demand", with Skold, Cifarelli, and former collaborators Watts and Rieflin joining him in the studio; he said at the time, "I talked with the usual KMFDM suspects to see if they were interested, and what we came up with was something better than what we had before." Recalled Esch in 2009, "I was happy about my new creative freedom at that time and so I refused the concept of a fast reunion of the original KMFDM."

Konietzko said of the reformed band, "Not only is it fun again, but it's devoid of all the personal confrontations due to egos and fractions that were once a part of the band," but said, "I really miss En Esch," in 2003. KMFDM released its first album in three years, Attak, in March 2002. The album was on the Billboard Independent Albums Chart for four weeks, peaking at No. 11.

=== New line-up (2003–2007) ===
Skold left after Attak to join Marilyn Manson. Over the next few years, Watts' bandmates from Pig joined KMFDM one by one. Jules Hodgson had already done guitar work for 2002's Attak. Andy Selway first played drums for KMFDM on WWIII in 2003, and Steve White contributed to 2005's Hau Ruck after touring with the band. All three, along with Watts and Cifarelli, were mentioned as band members on "Intro", the final track on WWIII, although that was to be the last album on which Watts performed. WWIII was on Billboard's Dance/Electronic Albums Chart for seven weeks, and peaked at No. 3.

Opium was re-released in 2002 as KMFDM001 on the band's new label, KMFDM Records, and a collection of songs recorded between 1984 and 1986 was released in 2004. Shortly after the release of WWIII, Konietzko began work on the soundtrack for 2004's Spider-Man 2 video game. Hau Ruck performed about as well as WWIII, appearing on Billboard's Dance/Electronic Albums Chart for eight weeks but only hitting No. 5. Unlike WWIII, Hau Ruck showed up on the Billboard Independent Albums chart for a single week at No. 48. A companion EP, Ruck Zuck, was released in 2006.

Konietzko took a new approach for Tohuvabohu, released in 2007. "Principally in the past, there used to be 2 people that would start songs: me and Jules. On this record I said to the other 2 guys, Andy (Selway) and Steve (White), 'Why don't you guys come up with something?'" Tohuvabohu was on Billboard's Dance/Electronic Albums Chart for just three weeks and peaked at No. 4. It appeared on the Independent Albums Chart for one week at No. 29. Tohuvabohu had a companion, Brimborium, a full length remix album released in 2008 that barely made it onto Billboard's Dance/Electronic Albums Chart, hitting No. 20 for a single week.

Metropolis Records announced in mid-2006 it would reissue KMFDM's entire Wax Trax!-era studio album back catalog, which had been out of print since the early 2000s. The albums were released in chronological order in groups of two or three from September 2006 to May 2007. Konietzko said the remastering was done over concerns about losing the rights to the back catalog after TVT defaulted on a loan, explaining, "The original agreement was that the catalog would have reverted back to me in 2008, anyway, but TVT and Rykodisc were thinking of just making a KMFDM compilation, which would have eliminated my catalog, and I didn't want that." Konietzko commented in 2006 that the current line-up was the best he had worked with, and said in a separate interview that his former bandmates were "looking at me for handouts". Konietzko announced in October 2007 that he was packing up and moving back to Germany in the next three months.

=== Return to Germany (2007–2016) ===
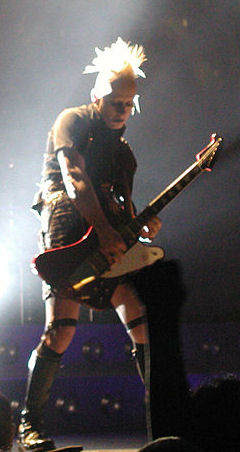
Tim Skold performing with Marilyn Manson in 2007

Following the Finnish school shootings of 2007 and 2008, media reports again attempted to draw a connection between the shooters and KMFDM, and noted that both listed the band among their favorites. In an interview with Norwegian broadcaster NRK shortly after the 2008 incident, Konietzko responded to these claims by saying the recent shootings were a by-product of the copycat mentality and the Finnish shooters' desire to emulate the lifestyles and actions of the Columbine shooters. "One of my biggest concerns immediately following this incident [the Columbine shooting] was that there would be copycats repeating such things in the future, as there often are when people commit heinous crimes and acts of violence. I was, unfortunately, right."

KMFDM re-released all of its old singles and hard-to-find tracks from before the 1999 breakup in a series of three double albums called Extra—Vol. 1, Vol. 2, and Vol. 3—in mid-2008. KMFDM Records released Skold vs. KMFDM in early 2009, which was a collaboration that Skold and Konietzko conducted over the Internet while on separate continents from June to October 2008. A follow-up is planned, but is not a high priority.

KMFDM's sixteenth studio album, Blitz, released in March 2009, showcased further collaboration with Skold, but less input from the band members not living in Germany. It reached No. 4 on Billboard's Dance/Electronic Albums Chart, and was on the chart for four weeks. Its companion remix album, Krieg, was released in early 2010. Two compilation albums, Würst and Greatest Shit, were released in September that same year.

On December 14, 2010, the official KMFDM website was changed to include a single image with the text "All Systems Have Been Ripped. The Internet Has Been Shut Down." A new song titled "Rebels in Control" became available for listening and download on the site, posted in support of Julian Assange with regards to the controversy over WikiLeaks.

Former band members Durante, Esch, Schulz, and Watts appeared with Mona Mur at the April 2011 Wax Trax! Retrospectacle in Chicago, a charity event celebrating the industrial music label. The group performed KMFDM songs from the Wax Trax! era, including "Juke Joint Jezebel", "Godlike, "Brute", and "Don't Blow Your Top". Konietzko expressed a desire to perform with the current band line-up, but was turned down by event organizers.

"Krank"
Part of the chorus from "Krank", which critics called "adrenalin-pumping" and "an aggressive stomper in the best KMFDM tradition"

KMFDM released WTF?! in April 2011, featuring what Konietzko called "a slew of guest musicians" including Rieflin, Koichi Fukuda, Free Dominguez, and William Wilson. The album's first single, "Krank", charted in both Germany and the United States. WTF?! was on Billboard's Dance/Electronic Albums Chart for one week at No. 8.

Work on KMFDM's eighteenth album began in February 2012. Titled Kunst, it was released on February 26, 2013. The band toured the United States in March and Europe in April 2013, as well as a second leg across the SW, CA and PNW parts of the US in the fall of 2013 entitled "We Are KMFDM" (subsequently filmed for a commemorative release), with direct support from Texas's own primal 2-drummer band CHANT, performing a 30 year career-spanning set. KMFDM reissued Opium and WWIII in October 2013.

On May 24, 2014, Konietzko announced on the band's Facebook page that a new album, titled Our Time Will Come, would be released on October 14, 2014. A new live album titled We Are KMFDM and a single called "Genau (The German in You)" were also announced. Our Time Will Come was released on October 14, 2014, on both CD and vinyl. The "Genau" single was not released, with a single for "Salvation" from the same album coming out instead in 2015. Another run of the US on the 'Salvation Tour' commenced in the summer of 2015.

=== Another line-up shift (2017–present) ===
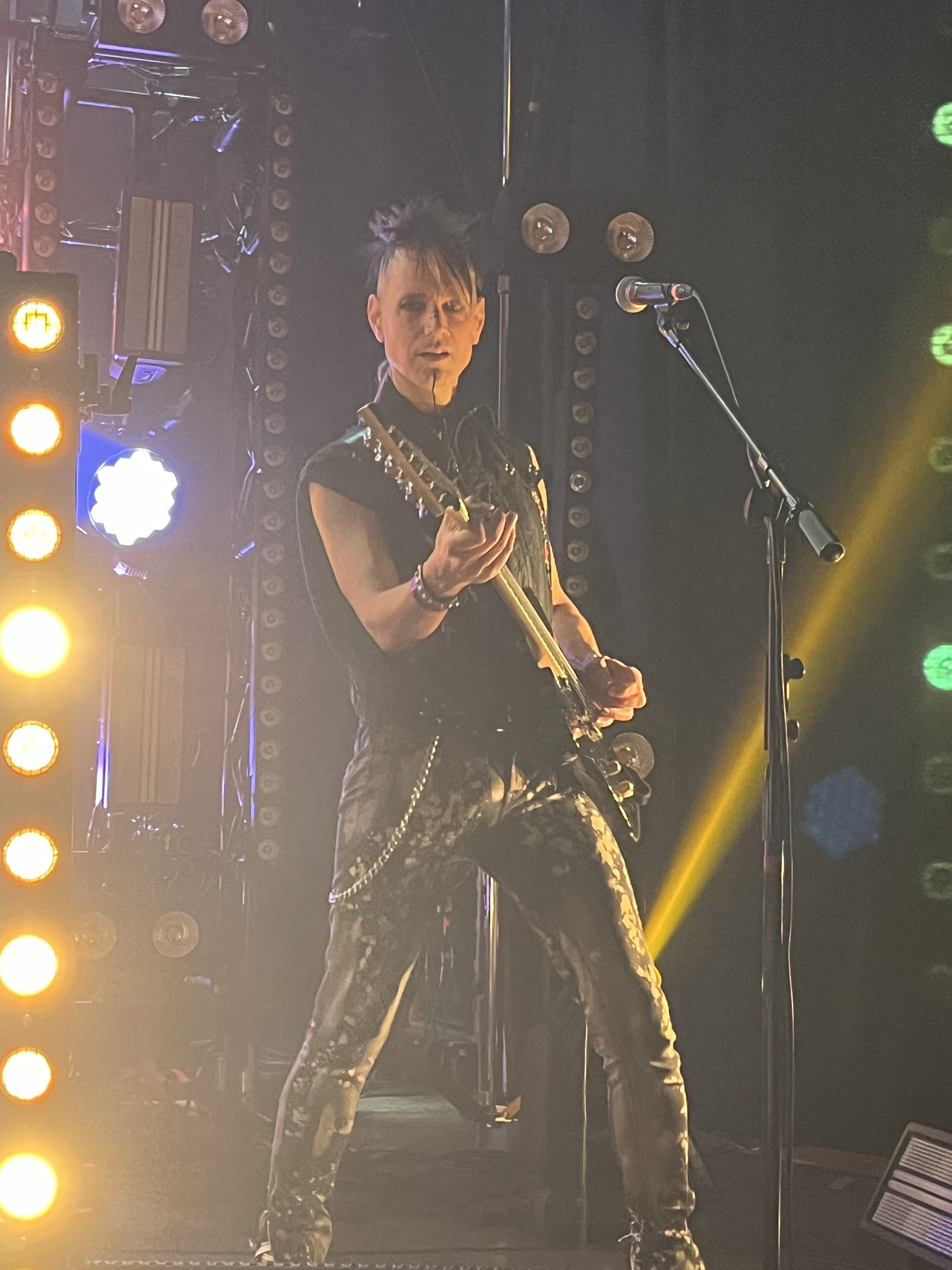
Andee Blacksugar performing with KMFDM in 2024

In April 2017, KMFDM revealed a new EP titled Yeah!; an album called Hell Yeah was released in August, with a U.S. tour planned in support of the releases for October. On June 23, Yeah! was released, followed by the release of Hell Yeah on August 18. Guitarists White and Hodgson were unavailable, so Konietzko recruited Chris Harms from Lord of the Lost to record the guitar parts. Harms, along with Lord of the Lost bandmates Pi (guitar) and Gared Dirge (keyboards), had been slated to perform as the live band for KMFDM's late 2017 tour. Lord of the Lost were unable to secure work visas to enter the U.S., so Andee Blacksugar was tapped to handle guitar tasks instead.

Highlights of the tour were captured live and can be heard on their fourth live album 'Live in the USSA', released in 2018. The album sonically presents the band in a more stripped-down, drum laden heavy metal style containing their obligatory cutting guitar riffs, melded with the traditional keys, samples, programming and additional percussion courtesy of band mainstay Sascha Konietzko. The new quartet of Konietzko, Cifarelli, Selway, and Blacksugar announced the album, Paradise, for release on September 27, 2019. The band features a variety of guest appearances, including KMFDM co-founder Raymond Watts for the first time since 2003. In July 2022, the band announced a brand new album, Hyëna was released on September 9. The title track was revealed as a promotional single at the end of August.

A new album commemorating KMFDM's 40 year anniversary (having formed on February 29, 1984) was released on February 2, 2024, entitled Let Go.

== Musical style, influences, and lyrical content ==
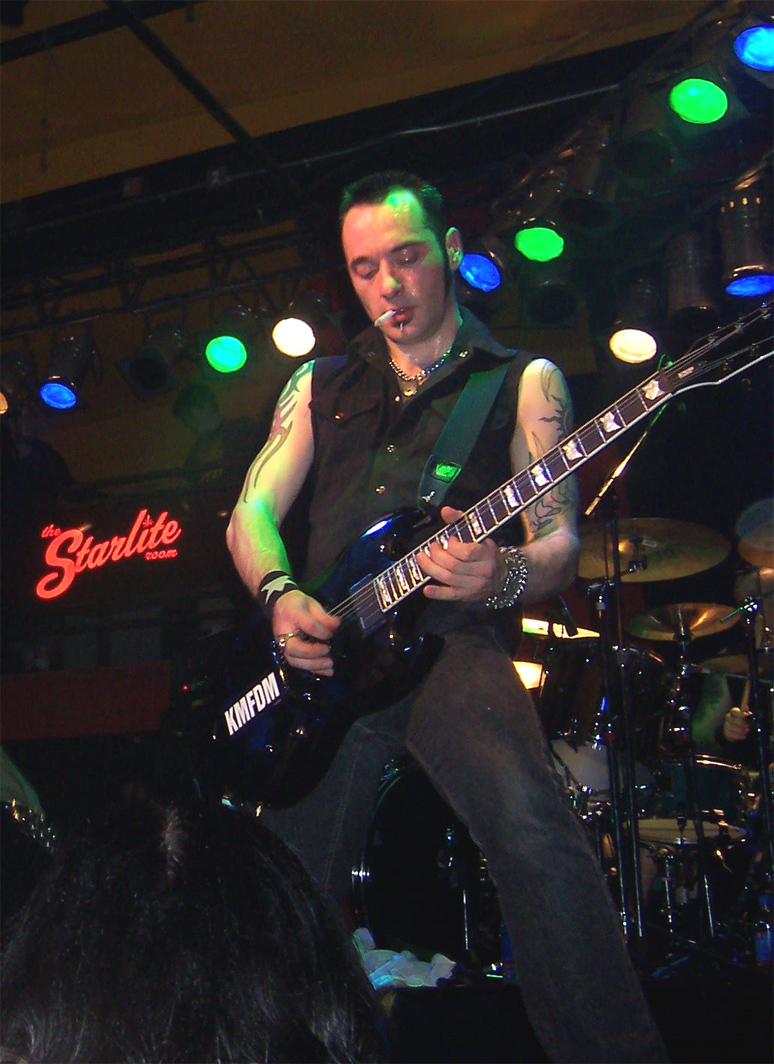
Jules Hodgson performing in Edmonton, Canada, October 2004

KMFDM's earliest output was performance art, as Konietzko incorporated not only visuals such as burning beds and exploding televisions, but also non-musical devices used as instruments, e.g. vacuum cleaners. The 1980s albums featured heavy use of sampling and studio manipulations, and the primary instruments used were synthesizers and drum machines. Konietzko has cited T. Rex, David Bowie, and Frank Zappa as inspiration in the early stages of KMFDM. Before forming the band, he listened to punk music like GBH and "true industrial" bands such as Throbbing Gristle.

The band's music has been described as industrial, industrial rock, electro-industrial, industrial metal, and techno-industrial. While recognized along with Ministry, Nine Inch Nails, and Skinny Puppy as pioneers in introducing industrial music to mainstream audiences, KMFDM describes its sound as "The Ultra-Heavy Beat". Konietzko once stated, "If I was to give myself a label it would be industrial-alternative-electronic-crossover-rock and danceabilly."

The band has made heavy use of guitars since its inception, and pioneered their use during the band's early days in Germany. Although not a metal fan, Konietzko said his "infatuation with ripping off metal licks" stemmed from his experiments with E-mu's Emax sampler in late 1986, adding, "What I always hated most about heavy metal was that the best riffs came only once and were never repeated. So the fascination, actually, was to sample a great riff, loop it, and play it over and over again." While the album Don't Blow Your Top was more sparse in content, due to the influence of producer Sherwood, it was the exception rather than the rule. Ministry founder and frontman Al Jourgensen, on tour with the band in 1989, described KMFDM as "a battalion of guitars marching through Europe."

"What Do You Know?"
This song, from the band's second album, features "scathing political commentary ... that helped define the group's subversive identity", sampling a speech by former U.S. president John F. Kennedy.

KMFDM's music has since been a fusion of electronic and heavy metal, with occasional elements of dub, as well as orchestral samples and live horns. Many songs feature prominent backing vocals by female singers such as Dorona Alberti, Travis, and Cifarelli. Many of the musicians who have played in the band are multi-instrumentalists, so there is a degree of versatility and freedom in the music.

Many albums feature one or more songs in which the band lampoons itself, notably in the lyrics to "Sucks" and "Inane". The band's "cynical detachment" has been compared to Steely Dan. Lyrics often express political concerns and call for the rejection of and resistance to terrorism, violence, oppression, censorship, and war. In the 1995 song "Terror", Konietzko specifically warns, "Fundamentalist forces are undermining the integrity of liberal and democratic political structures". Samples of news broadcasts and speeches by political leaders are sometimes featured in songs. Konietzko has said that while the 2003 album WWIII is critical of then-president George W. Bush, who was sampled extensively for the album, "It's not an anti-Bush record per se, it's an anti-stupidity record", and, "If we had a message, it would be: Think for Yourself and Don't Believe the Bullshit."

== Reception ==
As of July 2007, KMFDM had sold approximately two million records worldwide. Critics have been widely positive of KMFDM, though less enthusiastic about the band's earliest work. What Do You Know, Deutschland? was called "less energetic" and Don't Blow Your Top was called "a little flimsy" in comparison to later albums by AllMusic critics Andy Hinds and Vincent Jeffries, respectively. UAIOE, when the band's sound began to develop, was called "more assured" by Hinds and "more representative of KMFDM's true motives" by Thompson, who added that KMFDM's guitar-heavy sound inspired Ministry's own embrace of the instrument after the bands toured together in 1990.

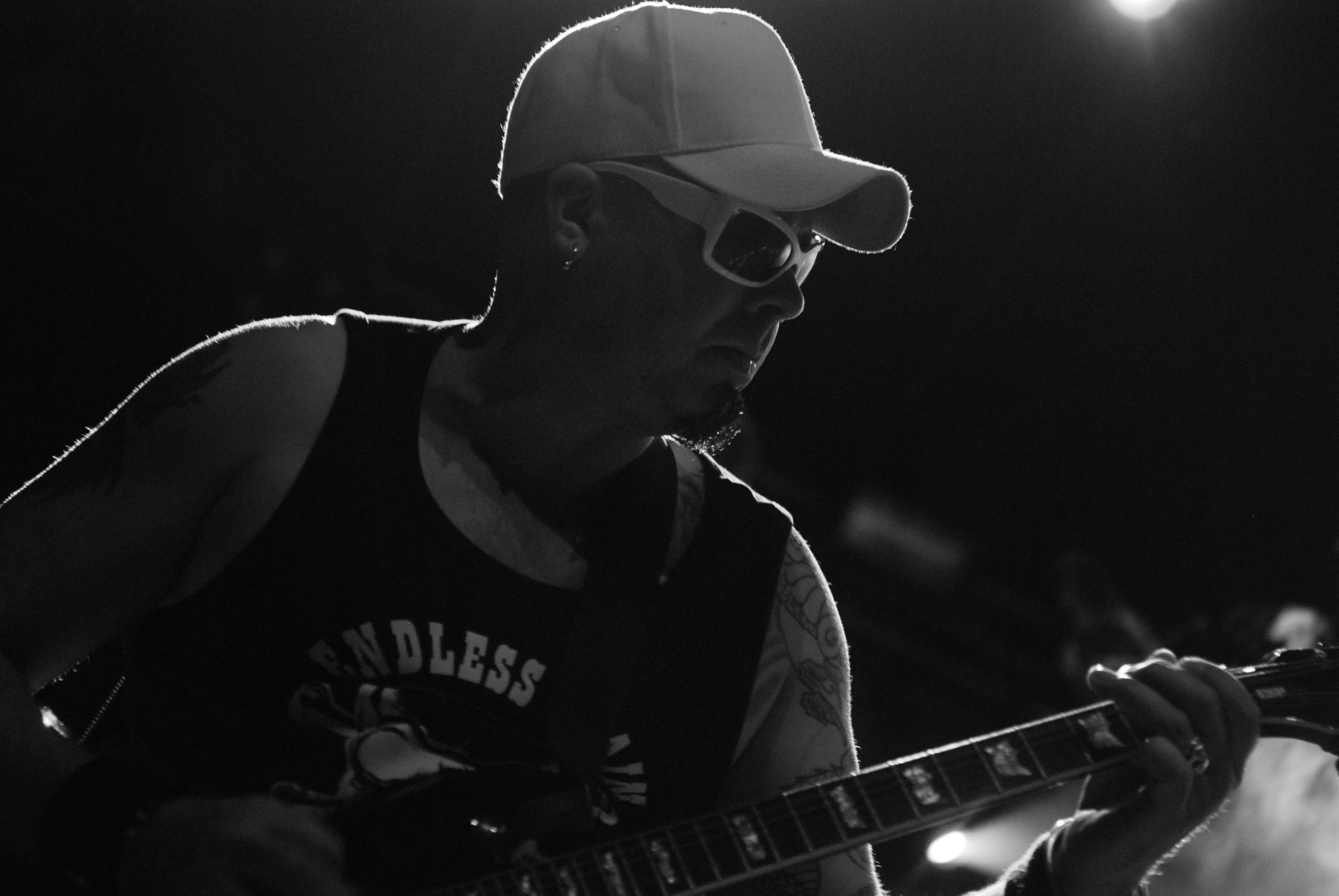
Steve White performing in Bolków, Poland, July 2009

The first major breakthrough in the band's critical reception was 1990's Naïve, called "one of their strongest releases" by Stephen Thomas Erlewine of AllMusic, "brilliant" by fellow AllMusic critic Ned Raggett, "superb" by Hinds, and "the most fun 'industrial dance' album ever" by Spin critic Chuck Eddy. The subsequent albums released in the 1990s were described as some of the band's strongest by AllMusic critic Greg Prato, with their metal guitars, industrial beats, and dance floor sensibilities praised by Ira Robbins and CMJ New Music Monthly critic Heidi MacDonald.

In 1995, Michael Saunders of the Boston Globe said of the band: "It's a small field, but KMFDM is tops in it: makers of dense, danceable, post-industrial torrents of noise. The German band specializes in fabricating aural assaults that can be intimidating to the uninitiated." MacDonald said in 1996, "With Ministry gone grindcore, Skinny Puppy just gone, and Nine Inch Nails a brand name, KMFDM is now the standard bearer of industrial", though Erlewine and Hinds felt the band was losing some steam towards the end of the decade.

Greg Rule declared in 1999, after its temporary disbandment, that KMFDM had "produced nine high-impact records that have earned them a large, loyal fanbase strewn across the planet." Erlewine called the band "one of Wax Trax's first industrial superstars", "an underground sensation", and "one of the major industrial bands of the '90s." Most of the band's albums released in the 21st century have been well-received, although Prato has commented on the sameness from one album to the next. Recent albums Blitz and WTF?! have been described as moving in an electronic, less guitar-focused direction by Trey Spencer of Sputnikmusic and AllMusic's David Jeffries.

== Touring and fanbase ==
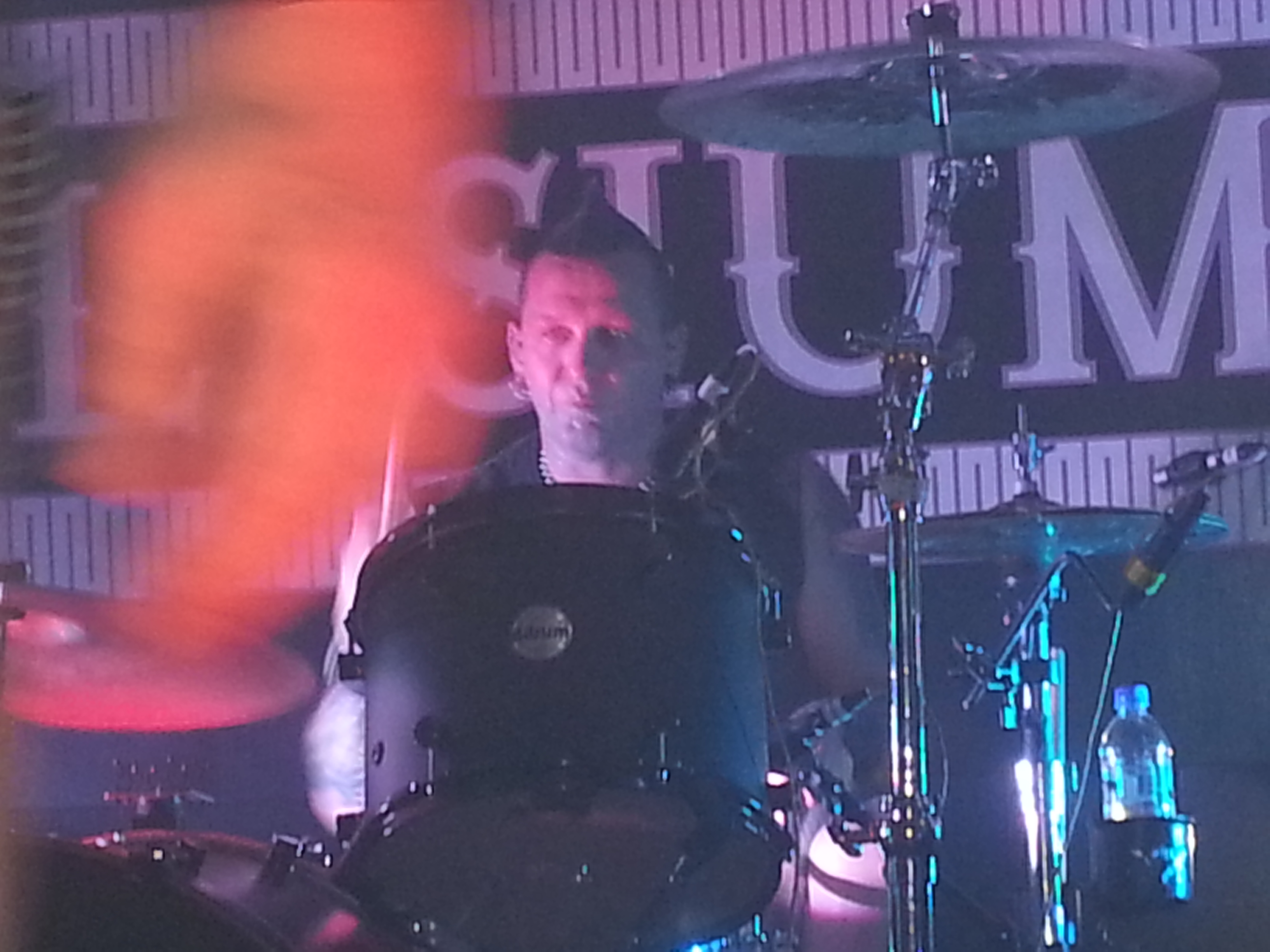
Andy Selway performing live with KMFDM

KMFDM has released on average an album every year and a half, and usually tours at least once in support of each album. At most concert venues, KMFDM mingles with the fans before and after the show to sign autographs, pose for photos, and answer questions. Konietzko, who keeps in contact with fans via e-mail and the band's website, and band representatives have experimented with ways for fans to interact more directly. KMFDM launched "Horde" in 2002, an exclusive fan club which gave members the opportunity to attend a private meet-and-greet with the band before every show, and allowed access to members-only music and footage online. A featurette on the Horde fan club appears on the WWIII Live 2003 DVD.

In 1993, the Dutch architectural studio MVRDV (today world-renowned) took inspiration for its name and logo from the band which was admired by Jacob van Rijs, one of the three founding partners and the "VR" in the name.

In the 2004 Fankam project, an audience member was selected at each concert to record that night's show, as well as some back-stage antics, with a hand-held digital video camera. The resulting footage was incorporated into the following year's 20th Anniversary World Tour DVD, which included fan photos submitted to the KMFDM official website. KMFDM encouraged fans to call a special "FanPhone" and leave a voice message in March 2007. The song "Superpower" from 2007's Tohuvabohu includes sound-clips from these messages. The band used the Fankam project again for its 2011 "Kein Mitleid" tour in the United States.

=== List of tours ===
All tours featured KMFDM headlining, except where noted.

List of KMFDM tours
Date	Name	Location	Notes	Ref.
1989–90	"The Mind Is a Terrible Thing to Taste"	United States	opening for Ministry	
1990	"Naïve"	Europe	with My Life with the Thrill Kill Kult	
1991	"Split"	United States		
June 1992	"Aloha Jerry Brown"	United States		
October–November 1992	"KMFDM Sucks Money"	United States		
1994	"Angstfest"	United States	Support: Sister Machine Gun and Chemlab	
May 1995	"Beat by Beat"	United States	Support: Dink	
Fall 1995	"In Your Face"	United States and Europe	Support: God Lives Underwater and Genitorturers	
1997	"Symbols"	United States and Europe		
2002	"Sturm & Drang"	United States	Sturm & Drang Tour 2002 live album, 16volt opened	
2003	"WWIII"	United States	WWIII Live 2003 live album	
2004	"20th Anniversary"	United States, Canada, Europe, Russia, and Australia		
2005	"Hau Ruck"			
2006	"Hau Ruck Zuck USSA"			
2009	"Kein Mitleid"	United States, Canada, and Europe		
2010	"Für die Mehrheit"	Europe		
August 2011	North American tour	United States and Canada		
Fall 2011	European tour	Europe		
Summer 2012	European tour	Germany, Belgium, and France		
March 2013	"I (HEART) YOU USSA Tour"	United States		
April 2013	"I (HEART) YOU Europe Tour"	Europe		
Fall 2013	"We Are KMFDM"	United States & Canada	Support: Chant	
Summer 2015	"Salvation Tour"	United States & Canada	Support: Chant	
Fall 2017	"Hell Yeah Tour"	United Kingdom & United States	Support: Lord of the Lost & Inertia, DJ Ritual & ohGr (select dates)	
September–October 2022	"Hyena Tour"	United States	Support: Chant	
March 2024	"Let Go Tour-40 Years of KMFDM"	United States	Support: Cyanotic, Morlocks, Sour Tongue	
February-March 2026	"Europe 2026"	Europe	Support: I Ya Toyah, Jesus on Extasy	

== Album artwork ==
Brute!'s album cover for Money. The man on the left is a self-portrait. Hughes' artwork has become closely associated with the band's image.

KMFDM has a long-standing relationship with commercial artist Aidan "Brute!" Hughes, who creates the artwork adorning almost all of the band's albums and singles, which has been called "one of rock music's most memorable cover art collections". Hughes' artwork is featured in KMFDM's music videos for "A Drug Against War" and "Son of a Gun", and on the band's promotional T shirts. Art critic Brian Sherwin said Hughes is probably best known for the collection of KMFDM artwork he has created.

All of his work, which has been called "striking", shares a distinct visual style inspired by Golden Age comic artists, Russian Constructivists, Italian Futurists, and woodcut artists. In an interview with Sherwin, Hughes stated, "KMFDM have cornered the market in industrial post-modern angst and so my work reflects that." Hughes said that initially he based his work on the music, which caused "artistic block". Konietzko gave him more freedom to use whatever themes he wished, resulting in the cover to Money, which Hughes said "was based upon my disillusionment with the street lifestyle I was experiencing at the time, and the art carries with it the implication that no matter what temptation lies in your path, you still gotta pay!"

The only studio album covers not designed by Hughes are Opium, which consists of a black-and-white photo, and Nihil, which was designed by Francesca Sundsten, wife of drummer Rieflin.

== Members ==
Current line-up

- Sascha Konietzko – vocals, guitars, bass, programming, keyboards, synthesizer, percussion, drums (1984–present)
- Lucia Cifarelli – vocals, keyboards (2000–present)
- Andy Selway – drums, programming (2003–present) (Note: Touring member in 2002–2003)
- Tidor Nieddu – guitars (2025–present)

Key former members

- Raymond Watts – vocals, programming (1984–1988, 1994–1995, 1997, 2002–2004) (Note: Studio guest in 2019)
- En Esch – vocals, drums, guitars, programming, percussion (1985–1999)
- Rudolph Naomi – drums (1985–1986, 1988–1991)
- Günter Schulz – guitars, programming (1989–1999)
- Mark Durante – guitars (1992–1997) (Note: Touring member in 1989 and studio guest in 1990)
- Jennifer Ginsberg – vocals (1994–1996)
- Bill Rieflin – drums, programming, percussion, bass (1995–1999, 2002–2003; died 2020) (Note: Studio guest in 1990 and 2011)
- Tim Sköld – vocals, guitars, bass, drums, programming (1997–2002, 2009)
- Jules Hodgson – guitars, bass, keyboards, programming (2002–2016) (Note: Studio guest in 2022)
- Steve White – guitars, programming (2003–2015) (Note: Touring member in 2002–2003)
- Andee Blacksugar – guitars, backing vocals (2017–2025)

== Discography ==
- What Do You Know, Deutschland? (1986)
- Don't Blow Your Top (1988)
- UAIOE (1989)
- Naïve (1990)
- Money (1992)
- Angst (1993)
- Nihil (1995)
- Xtort (1996)
- Symbols (1997)
- Adios (1999)
- Attak (2002)
- WWIII (2003)
- Hau Ruck (2005)
- Tohuvabohu (2007)
- Blitz (2009)
- WTF?! (2011)
- Kunst (2013)
- Our Time Will Come (2014)
- Hell Yeah (2017)
- Paradise (2019)
- Hyëna (2022)
- Let Go (2024)
- Enemy (2026)
