= Godlike (song) =

Single by KMFDM
- B-side: "Friede"
- Released: August 1990
- Recorded: 1990
- Genre: Industrial metal
- Length: 14:25
- Label: Wax Trax! Records
- Songwriter(s): Sascha Konietzko
- Producer(s): KMFDM, Paul Barker, Lee Popa

KMFDM singles chronology
"Virus" (1989)	"Godlike" (1990)	"Naïve/The Days of Swine & Roses" (1991)

Professional ratings
Review scores
Source	Rating
Allmusic	3/5 stars

"Godlike" is a song by industrial rock band KMFDM.

== Background ==
According to KMFDM frontman Sascha Konietzko, the song made its debut during KMFDM's 1990 tour with industrial metal band Ministry, being based on the lyrics by Patti Smith. When Koneitzko's bandmate En Esch, who had been singing the song live, was injured during a fire, Konietzko had to use new lyrics, as he didn't know the original words. He translated a German spoken word piece the band had been using at their live shows into English, and used the translation as the new lyrics.

After the tour, the band recorded a version for their album Naïve with a group of performers from other Wax Trax! Records bands. Later, Konietzko re-recorded a more electronic version for the single.

The track heavily features a sampled guitar riff from "Angel of Death" by Californian thrash metal band Slayer. This sample is looped from the beginning of "Godlike" and is heard almost continuously throughout the track. The same riff has been sampled by many other artists including Public Enemy for their track "She Watch Channel Zero".

== Release ==
"Godlike" was originally released as a single in 1990. In 2008, KMFDM Records re-released it as a 7" vinyl single, limited to 250 copies. On September 14, 2010, Godlike 2010, including new mixes of the song, was released, commemorating the single's 20th anniversary.

== Reception ==
"Godlike" was ranked No. 8 on COMA Music Magazine's 101 Greatest Industrial Songs of All Time.

== Track listing ==
=== 1990 release ===
No.	Title	Length
1.	"Godlike"	6:35
2.	"Friede"	4:47
3.	"Crazy Horses" (cover of The Osmonds, only on CD)	3:03
Total length:		14:25

=== 2008 7" reissue ===
No.	Title	Length
1.	"Godlike (12" Mix)"	6:34
2.	"Friede (12" Mix)"	4:44
Total length:		11:18

=== Godlike 2010 ===
No.	Title	Remixer	Length
1.	"Godlike 2010"	KMFDM	4:58
2.	"Godlike 2010 (Crash & Burn Mix)"	Koichi Fukuda	3:28
3.	"Godlike 2010 (Security Forces Mix)"	The Melvins	5:17
4.	"Godlike 2010 (Gabberlike Mix)"	Prong	3:29
5.	"Godlike 2010 (Phoenix Mix)"	3kStatic	5:19
Total length:			22:31
