= Naïve / The Days of Swine & Roses =

"Naïve"/"The Days of Swine & Roses"

Single by KMFDM/My Life with the Thrill Kill Kult
- Released: Early 1991
- Genre: Industrial
- Length: 20:31
- Label: Wax Trax!

KMFDM singles chronology
"Godlike" (1990)	"Naïve"/"The Days of Swine & Roses" (1991)	"Split" (1991)

My Life with the Thrill Kill Kult singles chronology
"A Girl Doesn't Get Killed by a Make-Believe Lover... 'Cuz It's Hot" (1990)	"Naïve/The Days of Swine & Roses" (1991)	"Sexplosion'" (1991)

Professional ratings
Review scores
Source	Rating
AllMusic	3/5 stars

"Naïve"/"The Days of Swine & Roses" is a split single released by KMFDM and My Life with the Thrill Kill Kult. "Naïve" is the title track from the KMFDM album Naïve. "The Days of Swine & Roses" originally appeared on the My Life with the Thrill Kill Kult album Confessions of a Knife... An edited version of the Thrill Kill Kult remix of "Naïve" was made into a music video, and reached No. 21 on Billboard's Dance/Club Play Songs Chart on March 23, 1991. The split single itself also peaked at No. 39 on Billboard's Dance Singles Sales Chart. "The Days of Swine & Roses" was ranked No. 61 on COMA Music Magazine's 101 Greatest Industrial Songs of All Time.

== Track listing ==
=== Original release (early 1991) ===
No.	Title	Length
1.	"Naïve" (Remix by My Life with the Thrill Kill Kult)	10:31
2.	"The Days of Swine & Roses" (Remix by KMFDM)	10:00
Total length:		20:31

=== Naïve (2008 7" reissue) ===
No.	Title	Length
1.	"Naïve"	5:23
2.	"Naïve (TKK Mix edit)"	4:19
Total length:		9:42
