= What Do You Know, Deutschland? =

Studio album by KMFDM
- Released: December 1986
- Recorded: 1983–86
- Studios: The Building Site and Zitty Sound, Hamburg
- Genres: Industrial; industrial dance
- Length: 62:49
- Labels: Z; Skysaw
- Producer: KMFDM

KMFDM chronology
Opium (1984)	What Do You Know, Deutschland? (1986)	Don't Blow Your Top (1988)

Singles from What Do You Know, Deutschland?
- 1. "Kickin' Ass" Released: 1987

What Do You Know, Deutschland? is the debut studio album by German industrial band KMFDM, released in December 1986 by Z and Skysaw Records.

== Background ==
What Do You Know, Deutschland? was recorded from 1983 to 1986, with some tracks recorded before En Esch had started working with KMFDM founders Sascha Konietzko and Raymond Watts, some even before the band officially formed in 1984.

== Release ==
Originally released by Z Records in Germany in 1986 with different artwork, the album was re-released, including songs from the "Kickin' Ass" single, in 1987 by SkySaw Records in the United Kingdom. In 1991, Wax Trax! Records released What Do You Know, Deutschland? in the United States without "Zip". "Zip" was later released on the compilation album Agogo.

A remastered reissue of What Do You Know, Deutschland? was released September 12, 2006, featuring new liner notes and photos of the band.

A new version of the track "Kickin' Ass" was released under Watts' musical project PIG in November 2020, featuring guitarwork by Esch.

== Reception ==
Professional ratings
Review scores
Source	Rating
Allmusic	3/5 stars

Vincent Jeffries of Allmusic said many of the songs lack the "guitar fury" of later releases, but that the album as a whole "has enough industrial grit to keep KMFDM fans interested in, if not awed by its dark intentions".

== Track listings ==
=== Z Records release (1986) ===
No.	Title	Music	Length
1.	"Zip"	Sascha Konietzko, En Esch	5:11
2.	"Deutsche Schuld"	Konietzko, Raymond Watts, Esch	4:45
3.	"Sieg Sieg"	Konietzko, Watts, Esch	7:00
4.	"Positiv"	Konietzko, Watts, Esch	3:25
5.	"Conillon"	Konietzko, Watts, Esch	5:50
6.	"What Do You Know?"	Watts	5:36
7.	"Me I Funk"	Konietzko, Watts, Esch	8:14
Total length:			40:01

"Me I Funk" is a partial cover of T. Rex's "Ballrooms of Mars" from The Slider.

=== SkySaw Records release (1987) ===
This version was released by Wax Trax! in 1991 (without the track "Zip"), and remastered by Metropolis in 2006 (with "Zip" reinstated).

No.	Title	Music	Length
1.	"Kickin' Ass" (LP version is edited, includes additional samples, 3:01)	Watts, Konietzko, Esch	4:01
2.	"Me I Funk"	Watts, Konietzko, Esch	8:24
3.	"What Do You Know?"	Watts	5:36
4.	"Zip" (not on Wax Trax! release)	Konietzko, Esch	5:12
5.	"Conillon"	Watts, Konietzko, Esch	5:50
6.	"Itchy Bitchy"	Watts, Konietzko, Esch, Jr. Blackmale	3:33
7.	"Deutsche Schuld"	Watts, Konietzko, Esch	4:48
8.	"Sieg Sieg"	Watts, Konietzko, Esch	5:36
9.	"Positiv"	Watts, Konietzko, Esch	3:31
10.	"Lufthans"	Blackmale	4:44
11.	"Itchy Bitchy (Dance Version)"	Watts, Konietzko, Esch, Blackmale	3:54
12.	"The Unrestrained Use of Excessive Force"	Watts	7:12
Total length:			62:41

== Personnel ==
- Sascha Konietzko – bass, vocals, guitar, synths, programming
- En Esch – vocals, guitars, drums, programming
- Raymond Watts – vocals, programming, engineering
- Jr. Blackmale – vocals ("Itchy Bitchy", "Lufthans")
