= Naïve (album) =

1990 studio album by KMFDM

Studio album by KMFDM
- Released: 15 November 1990
- Recorded: 1989–90
- Genre: Industrial rock; industrial dance
- Length: 49:58
- Label: Wax Trax!
- Producer: KMFDM

KMFDM chronology
UAIOE (1989)	Naïve (1990)	Money (1992)

Singles from Naïve
- 1. "Virus" Released: August 1989; 2. "Godlike" Released: August 1990; 3. "Naïve/The Days of Swine & Roses" Released: 1991

Naïve is the fourth studio album by German industrial band KMFDM, released on November 15, 1990, by Wax Trax! Records. It was recorded following KMFDM's return from their first visit to the United States and subsequent tour with Ministry. It was also the first record they released after signing directly to Wax Trax! Records.

== Background ==
The album was out of print for over a decade due to copyright infringement: the seventh track "Liebeslied" used unauthorized samples from a recording of "O Fortuna", from Carl Orff's 1930s cantata Carmina Burana. The album was recalled approximately three years after being released. Physical copies are rare and considered collector's items. In addition to this, "Godlike" samples "Angel of Death" by Slayer.

All of the tracks on the album, except for the original mixes of "Die Now-Live Later", "Liebeslied" and "Go to Hell" were subsequently available on other discs. The album was re-released as Naïve/Hell to Go, with some songs remixed, in 1994. A digitally remastered reissue of Naïve was released on 21 November 2006, along with Money and Angst. It was reissued with an edited version of the track "Liebeslied" without the offending sample. It also features the remixes that initially appeared on Naïve/Hell to Go.

== Critical reception ==
Professional ratings
Review scores
Source	Rating
AllMusic	4.5/5 stars

Naïve received excellent reviews. Stephen Thomas Erlewine called Naïve "one of [KMFDM's] strongest releases." Ned Raggett of AllMusic began his review by saying, "KMFDM brought it all together on the brilliant Naïve", doing "everything from four-to-the-floor beats to Wagnerian epic metal and back again". He went on to call it "one of industrial/electronic body music's key albums", and said that KMFDM was a band "so ridiculously good that everything they touch pretty much turns to gold". He also said that while the title track was "fantastic", the "total standout" of the album was "Liebeslied": "Outrageously interpolating Carl Orff's noted vocal piece Carmina Burana into a bombastic explosion of mechanical rhythms, orchestral hits, and an increasing amount of hero guitar feedback slabs, not to mention the husked, desperate lead vocals, it's a jawdropping masterpiece that demands and gets total surrender." In 2019, Pitchfork magazine ranked Naïve at number ten on its list of the thirty-three best industrial albums of all time, with writer Susan Elizabeth Shepard noting that the album combined "hip-hop beats and metal riffs into deep, big-beat anthems".

== Track listing ==
Naïve — original vinyl edition
No.	Title	Writer(s)	Length
1.	"Welcome"	Sascha Konietzko	0:18
2.	"Naïve"	Konietzko, En Esch, Günter Schulz, Rudolph Naomi	5:26
3.	"Die Now-Live Later"	Konietzko, Esch, Schulz	5:01
4.	"Piggybank"	Konietzko, Esch, Schulz, Naomi	6:37
5.	"Achtung!"	Konietzko, Esch, Schulz, Naomi	4:24
6.	"Friede" (Remix)	Konietzko, Esch, Schulz, Naomi	4:38
7.	"Liebeslied" (edited on 2006 re-release)	Konietzko, Esch, Schulz, Naomi	5:34
8.	"Go to Hell"	Konietzko, Esch, Schulz, Naomi	4:59
9.	"Virus" (Dub)	Konietzko, Esch, Schulz, Naomi	6:28

Naïve — original CD edition (additional tracks)
No.	Title	Music	Length
10.	"Disgust" (Live)	Konietzko, Esch, Schulz, Naomi	2:58
11.	"Godlike" (Chicago Trax Version)	Konietzko, Paul Barker, Bill Rieflin, William Tucker	3:33

Naïve — remastered CD edition (additional tracks; originally from Naïve/Hell to Go)
No.	Title	Music	Length
12.	"Go to Hell" (Fuck MTV Mix)	Mark Durante, Esch, Konietzko, Schulz	5:48
13.	"Virus" (Pestilence Mix)	Durante, Esch, Konietzko, Schulz	5:08
14.	"Godlike" (Doglike Mix)	Durante, Esch, Konietzko, Schulz	5:39
15.	"Liebeslied" (Infringement Mix)	Durante, Esch, Konietzko, Schulz	4:38
16.	"Die Now-Live Later" (Born Again Mix)	Durante, Esch, Konietzko, Schulz	4:42
Total length:			74:40

== Personnel ==
- Sascha Konietzko – vocals, bass, synths, programming, guitars
- En Esch – vocals, drums, guitars
- Günter Schulz – guitars
- Rudolph Naomi – drums (1–4, 6–10)

=== Additional personnel ===
- Christine Siewert – background vocals
- Johann Bley – drums (5)
- William Tucker – guitar (11)
- Bill Rieflin – drums (11)
- Mark Durante – guitar (11–16)

=== Production ===
- Brute – cover art
- Blank Fontana – engineering (1–11)
- Chris Shepard – engineering (12–16)
- Paul Barker – production (11)
- Lee Popa – production (11)

== Naïve/Hell to Go ==
Naïve/Hell to Go

Studio album by KMFDM
- Released: 1 March 1994
- Recorded: 1989–90, 1993
- Genre: Industrial rock
- Length: 50:30
- Label: Wax Trax!/TVT

Professional ratings
Review scores
Source	Rating
Allmusic	4/5 stars

Naïve/Hell to Go is a modified and remixed version of Naïve, with five of the original songs re-recorded, including "Liebeslied", which contained an unlicensed sample of "O Fortuna" from Carl Orff's cantata Carmina Burana. After Orff's publisher threatened the band with legal action, the original album was recalled.

=== Track listing ===
No.	Title	Length
1.	"Welcome"	0:17
2.	"Naïve"	5:23
3.	"Go to Hell (Fuck MTV Mix)"	5:45
4.	"Virus (Pestilence Mix)"	5:08
5.	"Godlike (Doglike Mix)"	5:37
6.	"Leibesleid (Infringement Mix)"	4:39
7.	"Die Now-Live Later (Born Again Mix)"	5:09
8.	"Piggybank"	6:36
9.	"Achtung!"	4:21
10.	"Friede (Remix)"	4:40
11.	"Disgust (Live in Seattle)"	2:55
