= UAIOE =

Studio album by KMFDM
- Released: 7 October 1989
- Recorded: 1988–89
- Studios: M.O.B., Hamburg
- Genres: Reggae rock; industrial rock
- Length: 33:29
- Label: Cash Beat
- Producer: KMFDM

KMFDM chronology
Don't Blow Your Top (1988)	UAIOE (1989)	Naïve (1990)

UAIOE is the third studio album by the German industrial band KMFDM. It was released on 7 October 1989 by Cash Beat Records. Several 1970s "rock" bands are referenced: The album's title track borrows heavily from the lyrical tropes of Frank Zappa, whereas the song "En Esch" is, lyrically, a cover version of Deep Purple's "Demon's Eye" (which also features the opening riff from Slayer's "Jesus Saves").

== Release ==
UAIOE was released in 1989 by Cash Beat Records in Germany, by Deutschland Strikeback Records in the United Kingdom and by Wax Trax! Records in the United States. A remastered reissue of UAIOE was released on 12 September 2006 with new liner notes and photos of the band.

== Reception ==
Professional ratings
Review scores
Source	Rating
AllMusic	2.5/5 stars
Robert Christgau	B+
The Encyclopedia of Popular Music	3/5 stars
MusicHound Rock: The Essential Album Guide	4/5 stars

UAIOE received somewhat positive reviews. Andy Hinds of AllMusic said the work sounded more complete than previous releases, and called "More & Faster" the band's first classic song. Robert Christgau said the album was "groovier than the noise norm" and said the guest vocalists "add personality".

== Track listing ==
All tracks are written by Sascha Konietzko and En Esch, unless otherwise noted.

No.	Title	Length
1.	"Murder"	3:26
2.	"UAIOE"	3:57
3.	"Loving Can Be an Art (Saturation Mix)" (Konietzko, Esch, Raymond Watts)	4:13
4.	"More & Faster 243"	2:55
5.	"Rip the System (Duck & Cover Mix)"	3:20
6.	"Thrash Up!"	3:17
7.	"En Esch"	3:19
8.	"Ganja Rock"	5:05
9.	"Thumb Thumb" (Konietzko, Watts, Esch)	3:55
Total length:		33:27

Cash Beat and Deutschland Strikeback bonus tracks
No.	Title	Length
10.	"More & Faster"	3:30
11.	"Rip the System"	3:34
12.	"Naff Off"	4:16
13.	"Virus"	5:40
Total length:		50:27

== Personnel ==
- En Esch – guitars, vocals, programming
- Sascha Konietzko – bass guitar, vocals, guitars, synths, programming, production (1–3, 5–9), mixing (1, 9), remastering
- Rudolph Naomi – drums, voice (12)
- Morgan Adjei – vocals (1, 3, 4, 8, 9)
- Sigrid Meyer – vocals (4, 6)

Production

- F.M. Einheit – production (4)
- Blank Fontana – engineering
- Chris Z – layout
- Justin Gammon – layout
- Nick Head – mixing (2, 5–8), vocals (12)
- Adrian Sherwood – mixing (3, 4)
- Brute! – artwork
- Fritz Brinckmanniherz – photography
- Alice Turzynski – photography
- Rick Fisher – remastering
