= Don't Blow Your Top (album) =

Studio album by KMFDM
- Released: 13 March 1988
- Studios: M.O.B. Studios, Hamburg
- Genres: Industrial rock, industrial
- Length: 32:49
- Label: Skysaw Records
- Producer: Sascha Konietzko

KMFDM chronology
What Do You Know, Deutschland? (1986)	Don't Blow Your Top (1988)	UAIOE (1989)

Singles from Don't Blow Your Top
- 1. "Don't Blow Your Top" Released: 1988

Alternative cover
- 2006 re-release cover

Professional ratings
Review scores
Source	Rating
Allmusic	2/5 stars

Don't Blow Your Top is the second studio album by German industrial band KMFDM, released on 13 March 1988 by Skysaw Records. It was the second and final album to feature Raymond Watts as a member of the band, although he would later re-join KMFDM on various separate occasions in the 1990s and 2000s.

A remastered version of the album was released on 12 September 2006, featuring new liner notes and photos of the band.

== Track listing ==
=== Vinyl/Cassette release ===
Side A
No.	Title	Writer(s)	Length
1.	"No Meat—No Man"	En Esch, Sascha Konietzko, Raymond Watts	3:52
2.	"Don't Blow Your Top"	Esch, Konietzko, Watts	3:40
3.	"Disgust (12" Version)"	Esch, Konietzko, Watts	4:28
4.	"Oh Look"	Esch, Konietzko	2:40
5.	"King Kong Dub (Rubber Mix)"	Esch, Konietzko, Jr. Blackmale	2:02

Side B
No.	Title	Writer(s)	Length
6.	"Killing"	Esch, Konietzko	5:20
7.	"What a Race"	Esch, Konietzko	3:37
8.	"No News"	Esch, Konietzko	4:30
9.	"Oh Look II"	Esch, Konietzko	2:38
Total length:			32:49

=== CD release ===
No.	Title	Writer(s)	Length
1.	"No Meat—No Man"	Esch, Konietzko, Watts	3:53
2.	"Don't Blow Your Top"	Esch, Konietzko, Watts	3:40
3.	"Killing"	Esch, Konietzko	5:27
4.	"Disgust"	Esch, Konietzko, Watts	5:29
5.	"Oh Look"	Esch, Konietzko	2:39
6.	"King Kong Dub (Rubber Mix)"	Esch, Konietzko, Blackmale	2:04
7.	"What a Race"	Esch, Konietzko	3:37
8.	"No News"	Esch, Konietzko	4:37
9.	"Tod Durch Bongo-Bongo"	Esch, Konietzko	6:36
10.	"Killing (For Your Sampling Kit)"	Esch, Konietzko	8:39
11.	"Oh Shit"	Esch, Konietzko	4:51
Total length:			51:32

== Reception ==
Andy Hinds from Allmusic said that Don't Blow Your Top "sounds a little flimsy when compared to the band's pile-driving later work", and that it sounds "like a combination of early Meat Beat Manifesto, Twitch-era Ministry, and even...the more primitive stuff of Alien Sex Fiend."

== Personnel ==
- Sascha Konietzko – production, bass, vocals, guitars, synths, programming
- En Esch – vocals, guitars, drums, programming
- Raymond Watts – engineering on "No Meat—No Man", vocals, programming
- Jr. Blackmale – vocals on "King Kong Dub (Rubber Mix)"
- Sigrid Meyer – vocals on "Don't Blow Your Top", "Disgust", "Oh Shit"
- Blank Fontana – engineering except on "No Meat—No Man"
- Adrian Sherwood – mixing on "Don't Blow Your Top", "Killing", "King Kong Dub (Rubber Mix)", "No News", "What a Race"
