= Don't Blow Your Cover: A Tribute to KMFDM =

Compilation album by Various artists
- Released: 8 August 2000
- Genre: Industrial rock
- Label: Cleopatra

Professional ratings
Review scores
Source	Rating
Allmusic	2/5 stars

Don't Blow Your Cover: A Tribute to KMFDM is a tribute album by various industrial rock artists. It includes covers by former KMFDM members Raymond Watts (under the alias "Pig") and Guenter Schulz. The title is a play on words based on the 1988 KMFDM album Don't Blow Your Top.

The album is also sold with an identical track listing under the alternate title "Stray Bullet: A Tribute to KMFDM"

== Track listing ==
All tracks are written by KMFDM.

No.	Title	Cover Artist(s)	Length
1.	"Disobedience" (Nihil)	Pig
2.	"Light (Musik ist Macht Mix)" (Angst)	Günter Schulz
3.	"Power" (Xtort)	Dkay.com / Die Krupps
4.	"Virus" (Naïve)	Sigue Sigue Sputnik
5.	"A Drug Against War" (Angst)	Razed in Black
6.	"Vogue" (Money)	Rosetta Stone
7.	"Don't Blow Your Top" (Don't Blow Your Top)	16volt vs. Spahn Ranch
8.	"Money" (Money)	Sheep on Drugs
9.	"Spiritual House" (Money)	Transmutator featuring Shirley Dayton
10.	"Sex on a Flag" (Money)	Interface vs. Nick Shifter
11.	"Juke Joint Jezebel" (Nihil)	Inertia
12.	"Megalomaniac" (Symbols)	Shining featuring Julian Beeston
13.	"Stray Bullet" (Symbols)	The Filmstrip
