= WWIII Live 2003 =

Live album by KMFDM
- Released: July 27, 2004
- Recorded: October 27, 2003 at the House of Blues, Chicago
- Genre: Industrial metal, industrial rock, alternative metal, nu metal
- Label: Sanctuary

KMFDM live album chronology
| Sturm & Drang Tour 2002 (2003) | WWIII Live 2003 (2004) | WE ARE (2014) |

WWIII Live 2003 is a live album by industrial rock band KMFDM from their WWIII tour, recorded at the House of Blues, Chicago on October 27, 2003. It was released on July 27, 2004, on Sanctuary Records. It includes many of the songs from the WWIII album, along with some songs from other albums. The DVD release includes live footage from different venues throughout the tour. The band once again consists of 3 members of <PIG> (as well as Watts himself), and these 3 members would ultimately be drafted into KMFDM fulltime as Watts and the band <PIG> would enter a lengthy hiatus.

== Reception ==
Professional ratings
Review scores
| Source | Rating |
|---|---|
| ReGen Magazine | positive |
| PopMatters | negative |

WWIII Live 2003 received mixed reviews. Ilker Yücel of ReGen Magazine gave a positive review, while Richard T. Williams of PopMatters panned the release, saying, "The sound of today's KMFDM isn't only devoid of the danceability that once defined it, it is helplessly, aimlessly generic."

== Track listing ==
=== CD release ===
| No. | Title | Album | Length |
|---|---|---|---|
| 1. | "WWIII" | WWIII | 5:03 |
| 2. | "From Here on Out" | WWIII | 4:00 |
| 3. | "Blackball" | WWIII | 5:06 |
| 4. | "Ultra" | Nihil | 4:36 |
| 5. | "Brute" | Nihil | 3:43 |
| 6. | "Stars & Stripes" | WWIII | 4:18 |
| 7. | "Pity for the Pious" | WWIII | 4:25 |
| 8. | "Moron" | WWIII | 5:08 |
| 9. | "Revenge" | WWIII | 5:14 |
| 10. | "Bullets, Bombs & Bigotry" | WWIII | 4:32 |
| 11. | "Light" | Angst | 5:28 |
| 12. | "Juke Joint Jezebel" | Nihil | 5:07 |
| 13. | "Intro" | WWIII | 4:56 |
| 14. | "A Drug Against War" | Angst | 4:48 |
| Total length: | | | 66:24 |

=== DVD release ===
1. "WWIII"
2. "From Here on Out"
3. "Blackball"
4. "Brute"
5. "Stars & Stripes"
6. "Pity for the Pious"
7. "Moron"
8. "Revenge"
9. "Bullets, Bombs & Bigotry"
10. "Light"
11. "Juke Joint Jezebel"
12. "Intro"
13. "A Drug Against War"

Music videos:

1. "Skurk" (from Attak)
2. "Ultra" (from Nihil)
3. "Stars & Stripes" (from WWIII)

Additional after-show, backstage, interview and studio footage and more

== Personnel ==
- Raymond Watts – vocals, guitars
- Sascha Konietzko – vocals, percussion, keyboards
- Lucia Cifarelli – vocals, keyboards
- Steve White - guitars
- Jules Hodgson – guitars
- Andy Selway – drums
