= Juke-Joint Jezebel =

Single by KMFDM

from the album Nihil
- B-side: "Kraut"
- Released: 28 February 1995
- Genre: Industrial rock
- Length: 5:40
- Label: Wax Trax!/TVT
- Songwriters: Sascha Konietzko, Klaus Schandelmaier, Günter Schulz, Raymond Watts
- Producer: Sascha Konietzko

KMFDM singles chronology
"Glory" (1994)	"Juke-Joint Jezebel" (1995)	"Brute" (1995)

Audio sample
- "Juke-Joint Jezebel": file; help

"Juke-Joint Jezebel" is a song by industrial rock group KMFDM from their 1995 album Nihil. It is KMFDM's most widely known song to date, with around three million copies of the song sold across various releases.

== Background and composition ==
The music for the song was written primarily by KMFDM frontman Sascha Konietzko, who asked returning band member Raymond Watts to write the lyrics for "Juke-Joint Jezebel" as well as a few other tracks from Nihil. Also credited as authors are En Esch and Günter Schulz. When mixing the song, Konietzko thought it sounded too "awful" to be included on Nihil, but TVT Records, to whom KMFDM were signed at the time, wanted to put it on the album, certain it would become a hit.

In KMFDM's profile for Trouser Press, Neil Strauss highlights Watts' lyrics and looped guitar riffs and electro-funk beats as the song's main features. In a 2013 book Assimilate: A Critical History of Industrial Music, musician and scholar S. Alexander Reed called the song "iconic", citing it as an example of industrial music's "use of gestures from traditional African-derived musics...", and notes "a massive gospel choir" of backup singers in the chorus. In addition to this, the "sleazy and exuberant" chorus features a harmonic use of the Mixolydian mode, which seems to "set the song apart from industrial conventions," with lyrics describing pleasure from self-destruction, "tapping into shallow perceptions of religious fervor and lasciviousness."

== Release ==
"Juke-Joint Jezebel" single was initially released on 28 February 1995. After the release of Nihil, a second version of the single was released with additional remixes by Italian record producer Giorgio Moroder. The Canadian release of Juke-Joint Jezebel: The Giorgio Moroder Mixes includes a bonus CD titled The Year of the Pig Collection, which features one track each from KMFDM's previous six studio albums, as well "Fuck Me" from Sin Sex & Salvation. "Juke-Joint Jezebel" was also released on a 12" entitled Year of the Pig. The single did not enter the Billboard Modern Rock Tracks chart, but peaked at number 27 on the Hot Dance Music/Club Play chart.

The song was accompanied by two music videos, both directed by Eric Zimmerman. The first, set to the single edit of album version and featured later on Beat by Beat by Beat compilation, combines the live footage with the animations from the Patlabor 1 anime. The other video, set to Moroder's "Metropolis" remix, was released to promote the 1995 Mortal Kombat film and uses footage from the film. MTV was reluctant to air the video, objecting to the footage featuring violence.

The original version of the song is used in the 1995 film Bad Boys, while the "Metropolis" remix mentioned above appears on the 1995 Mortal Kombat soundtrack. Both soundtracks eventually went platinum. The album version of the song can also be heard in the "Home Is Where the Tart Is" episode of Beverly Hills, 90210.

The original single version was re-released as a 7" in 2009. On 25 October 2010 "Juke-Joint Jezebel" was made available as a downloadable song for the Rock Band Network.

== Critical reception ==
Professional ratings
Review scores
Source	Rating
AllMusic	3/5 stars
Billboard	positive

"Juke-Joint Jezebel" has received significant critical acclaim. Heidi MacDonald of CMJ New Music Monthly called the song "nearly flawless". Andy Hinds of AllMusic, mentioning the song in the main album's review, called it "an enduring and indispensable dancefloor favorite at goth/industrial clubs around the world." Greg Kot of the Chicago Tribune said it "swaggers like a Bourbon Street hooker, with crunching guitars and a swooping, gospelish chorus". "Juke-Joint Jezebel" was listed at No. 23 on COMA Music Magazine's "101 Greatest Industrial Songs of All Time" feature in 2012. The track was also featured on Alternative Press' list of "10 Industrial-Rock Classics That Completely Defined the ’90s."

Holding a negative opinion of the song since mixing it, Konietzko admitted in 2016 he still did not like the song, which was retired from the band's concert setlist in 2003. It was pointedly left off the band's greatest hits album Rocks — Milestones Reloaded, along with other songs such as "Vogue" because the group felt such songs were not part of their ideal setlist. Even so, he was pleased that the song had become successful enough that it continued to sell: "It pays the rent, to this day."

== Track listings ==
Original release (1995) (Re-released in 2009 as 7")
No.	Title	Length
1.	"Juke-Joint Jezebel"	4:11
2.	"Kraut"	4:59
Total length:		9:10

The Giorgio Moroder Mixes (1995)
No.	Title	Length
1.	"Juke-Joint Jezebel (Poly-Matrix)"	4:18
2.	"Juke-Joint Jezebel (Original Single Edit)"	4:11
3.	"Juke-Joint Jezebel (Metropolis)"	5:17
4.	"Juke-Joint Jezebel (Paradox)" (only available on CD)	4:32
5.	"Juke-Joint Jezebel (Poly-Matrix X-Tended)" (only available on CD — 12" substituted instrumental version)	6:17
6.	"Kraut" (only available on CD)	4:59
Total length:		29:34

The Year of the Pig Collection Canadian bonus CD (1995)
No.	Title	Length
1.	"Kickin' Ass" (What Do You Know, Deutschland?)	4:01
2.	"Fuck Me" (Sin Sex & Salvation)	3:47
3.	"Go to Hell (Fuck MTV Mix)" (Naïve/Hell to Go)	5:45
4.	"No Meat-No Man" (Don't Blow Your Top)	3:50
5.	"UAIOE" (UAIOE)	3:53
6.	"Spiritual House" (Money)	5:20
7.	"No Peace" (Angst)	4:28
Total length:		31:04

Year of the Pig 12" (1995)
No.	Title	Length
1.	"Juke-Joint Jezebel"	4:34
2.	"Secret Skin" (Sin Sex & Salvation)	3:39
3.	"Go To Hell" (Naïve/Hell to Go)	5:23
4.	"Kraut"	5:23
Total length:		18:59

== Personnel ==
- Raymond Watts – vocals (Juke-Joint Jezebel)
- Sascha Konietzko – vocals, synthesizers, drums
- En Esch – vocals, hi-hat
- Günter Schulz – guitars, vocals
- Jennifer Ginsberg – female vocals (Juke-Joint Jezebel)

=== Production ===
- Sascha Konietzko – production, mixing
- Chris Shepard – engineering, production, mixing
- Sam Hofstedt – assistant engineering
- David Collins – mastering
- Giorgio Moroder – mixing (The Giorgio Moroder Mixes)
- Chris Cox – mixing (The Giorgio Moroder Mixes)
- Aidan Hughes – artwork
- Chris Z – type
- Greg Knoll – type

== Bibliography ==
- Reed, S. Alexander (2013). Assimilate: A Critical History of Industrial Music. Oxford University Press. pp. 216–217, 271, 287. ISBN 978-0-19-983260-6. LCCN 2012042281. OCLC 1147729910 – via the Internet Archive.
