= Rules (KMFDM song) =

Single by KMFDM
- Released: November 5, 1996
- Recorded: 1996
- Genre: Industrial rock
- Length: 20:22
- Label: Wax Trax! Records/TVT Records
- Songwriter(s): Chris Connelly, Mark Durante, Sascha Konietzko, Günter Schulz
- Producer(s): KMFDM

KMFDM singles chronology
| "Power" (1996) | "Rules" (1996) | "Megalomaniac" (1997) |

Professional ratings
Review scores
| Source | Rating |
|---|---|
| Allmusic | 2.5/5 stars |

"Rules" is a song from KMFDM's 1996 album Xtort. It was also released on a three track EP.

== Track listing ==
=== 1996 release ===
| No. | Title | Length |
|---|---|---|
| 1. | "Son of a Gun (Overhauled by Sascha K. & Chris Shepard)" | 3:41 |
| 2. | "Inane (Undermined by En Esch & Chris M. Flam)" | 8:28 |
| 3. | "Rules (Reapplied by Raymond Watts & Steve White)" | 8:13 |
| Total length: | | 20:22 |

=== 2009 7" reissue ===
| No. | Title | Length |
|---|---|---|
| 1. | "Rules" | 4:05 |
| 2. | "Son of a Gun (Overhauled Mix)" | 3:40 |
| Total length: | | 7:45 |

== Personnel ==
- Sascha Konietzko - vocals, bass, synthesizers, programming, drums (3), production, mixing
- Gunter Schulz - guitars, production, mixing
- En Esch - solo-guitar (2)
- Dorona Alberti - vocals (1)
- Chris Connelly - vocals (3)
- Mark Durante - slide guitars (2, 3)
- Bill Rieflin - drums (1, 2)
- Cheryl Wilson - vocals (2, 3)
- Bruce Bendinger - voice-over (2)
- Ron Lowe – drill & vacuum cleaner (1)
