= Help Us—Save Us—Take Us Away =

Single by KMFDM
- Released: September 15, 1992
- Recorded: 1990–1991
- Genre: Industrial rock, industrial dance
- Length: 39:44
- Label: Wax Trax!
- Songwriter(s): Sascha Konietzko, Günter Schulz
- Producer(s): Sascha Konietzko

KMFDM singles chronology
"Money" (1992)	"Help Us—Save Us—Take Us Away" (1992)	"Sucks" (1992)

"Help Us—Save Us—Take Us Away" is a song by industrial rock group KMFDM from their 1992 album Money. The "Schnitzel Mix" on the single is identical to the album version.

== Reception ==
The Trouser Press Guide to '90s Rock described the singing of Dorona Alberti on the song as "Nietsche-goes-disco chant[ing]" and the song's steel guitar as "lonesome". Jeff Bagato of Option magazine called the song "a fascinating and oddly beautiful concoction".

== Track listing ==
=== 1992 release ===
No.	Title	Length
1.	"Help Us—Save Us—Take Us Away" (Wiener-Mix)	4:12
2.	"Help Us—Save Us—Take Us Away" (Schnitzel-Mix)	6:02
3.	"Help Us—Save Us—Take Us Away" (Jäger-Mix)	5:25
4.	"Help Us—Save Us—Take Us Away" (Meister-Mix)	5:17
5.	"Help Us—Save Us—Take Us Away" (Oktoberfest-Mix)	5:13
6.	"Bargeld" (Money-Mix)	7:14
7.	"Bargeld" (Cashflow-Mix)	6:21
Total length:		39:44

=== 2008 7" reissue ===
No.	Title	Length
1.	"Help Us / Save Us / Take Us Away" (Wiener Mix)	4:16
2.	"Help Us / Save Us / Take Us Away" (Schnitzel Mix)	5:59
Total length:		10:15
