= Glory (KMFDM song) =

Single by KMFDM
- Released: October 31, 1994
- Genre: Industrial metal
- Length: 30:46
- Label: Wax Trax! Records/TVT Records
- Songwriters: Sascha Konietzko, Günter Schulz, Chris Shepard
- Producer: KMFDM

KMFDM singles chronology
"Light" (1994)	"Glory" (1994)	"Juke Joint Jezebel" (1995)

Professional ratings
Review scores
Source	Rating
Allmusic	4/5 stars

"Glory" is a KMFDM single from the album Angst. It contains three remixes of the title track "Glory" (as well as the version from Angst), plus remixes of the tracks "Lust" (by Chemlab) and "Move On", both originally from Angst. There is also a rough mix of "Trust," which was released in its final version on the album Nihil.

== Track listing ==
=== 1994 release ===
No.	Title	Length
1.	"Glory (Album Version)"	3:53
2.	"Trust (Never Mix)"	3:46
3.	"Glory (War & Slavery Mix)"	3:46
4.	"Lust (Chem-Lust Mix)"	5:27
5.	"Glory (Exploitation Dub)"	4:01
6.	"Move On (Scott Burns Remix)"	4:22
7.	"Glory (Cajun Dub)"	5:31
Total length:		30:46

=== 2009 7" Reissue track listing ===
No.	Title	Length
1.	"Glory"	3:55
2.	"Glory (Exploitation Mix)"	4:00
Total length:		7:55

=== 2014 12" release ===
No.	Title	Length
1.	"Glory (War & Slavery Mix)"	3:46
2.	"Trust (Never Mix)"	3:46
3.	"Glory (Exploitation Mix)"	4:01
4.	"Lust (Chem-Lust Mix)"	5:27
5.	"Glory (Cajun Mix)"	5:31
Total length:		22:31

== B-side ==
The song "A Hole in the Wall" was remixed (as "Hole in the Wall") for this single, but was not released until it appeared on the compilation album Agogo.
