= Sturm & Drang Tour 2002 =

Live album by KMFDM
- Released: 3 June 2003
- Recorded: 24–27 June 2002
- Genre: Industrial rock, nu metal, EDM
- Label: Metropolis

KMFDM live album chronology
Sturm & Drang Tour 2002 (2003)	WWIII Live 2003 (2004)

Sturm & Drang Tour 2002 is a KMFDM album recorded live during the Sturm and Drang Tour in 2002. It was compiled from the Cleveland, Detroit and Chicago shows. It includes some of the tracks from the Attak album, along with some songs from other albums. The tour featured 16 Volt, Kidneythieves, and PIG as supporting acts. KMFDM's lineup consisted of 3 members of Pig's band (2 guitarists and the drummer), along with Bill Rieflin playing bass guitar.

== Track listing ==
No.	Title	From Album	Length
1.	"D.I.Y."	Adios	4:55
2.	"Attak/Reload"	Attak	3:46
3.	"Dirty"	Attak	4:53
4.	"Ultra"	Nihil	4:39
5.	"Boots"	Boots EP	3:04
6.	"Yohoho"	Attak	4:19
7.	"Find It Fuck It Forget It"	The Swining by PIG	2:58
8.	"Sturm & Drang"	Attak	4:03
9.	"Megalomaniac"	Symbols	4:34
10.	"Flesh"	Nihil	5:04
11.	"Wrath"	Xtort	4:20
12.	"Hothole"	Sinsation by PIG	4:37
13.	"Spit Sperm"	Symbols	5:09
Total length:			56:21

== Personnel ==
- Sascha Konietzko – vocals, percussion, samplers, synthesizers
- Raymond Watts – vocals, guitars
- Lucia Cifarelli – vocals, ninja-sidstation
- Bill Rieflin – bass
- Jules Hodgson – guitars
- Andy Selway – drums
- Steve White – guitars
