= Brute =

Brute or The Brute may refer to:

== People ==
- Brute, a pseudonym of English commercial artist Aidan Hughes (born 1956)
- "Brute", nickname of US Marine Corps Lieutenant General Victor H. Krulak (1913–2008)
- Brute Bernard, ring name of Canadian wrestler Jim Bernard (1921–1984)
- Simon Bruté (1779–1839), missionary and first bishop of the Diocese of Vincennes, Indiana
- Brutus, the cognomen of an Ancient Roman family whose vocative form is "Brute"
- Bill "The Brute" Sanger, a member of the Cherry Hill Gang, a late nineteenth century New York City street gang
- The Brute (wrestler), ring name of professional wrestler John Czawlytko in the early 1990s
- "The Brute", nickname of American jazz tenor saxophonist Ben Webster (1909–1973)
- Marcus Junius Brutus the Younger, a Roman politician and one of Julius Caesar's assassins

== Arts, entertainment, and media ==
- BRUTE!, a magazine published by English artist Aidan Hughes who also occasionally uses "Brute" as pseudonym
- Et tu, Brute?, famous statement by Julius Caesar to Marcus Junius Brutus the Younger, in Shakespeare's play Julius Caesar
- The Brute: A Joke in One Act (1888), a play by Anton Chekhov
- The Brute: A Comic Opera in One Act (1967), a comic opera by Lawrence Moss based on the Chekhov play

=== Fictional or mythological entities ===
- Brute (comics), various characters
- Brute or Brutus of Troy, a legendary descendant of the Trojan hero Æneas, in mediæval British legend the founder and first king of Britain
- Brutes (Halo), an alien race in the Halo video game franchise

=== Films ===
- The Brute (1914 film), a lost early silent feature film
- The Brute (1920 film), an American film produced for African-American audiences by director Oscar Micheaux
- The Brute (1927 film), a lost silent American Western film
- La Brute (1921), a French film directed by Daniel Bompard
- El Bruto (1953), a Mexican drama film directed by Luis Buñuel
- The Brute (1961 film), a Hungarian production directed by Zoltán Fábri
- The Brute (1977), a British film directed by Gerry O'Hara

=== Literature ===
- "The Brute" (1906), a short story by Joseph Conrad
- The Brute (1912), a novel by Frederic Arnold Kummer
- The Brute (1924), a novel by W. Douglas Newton
- The Brute (1925), a novel by Max Brand, writing as David Manning
- The Brute (1946), a novel by Paul Rénin
- The Brute (1951), a novel by Guy des Cars
- Les Brutes (2006), a novel by Philippe Jaenada
- Brute: The Life of Victor Krulak, U.S. Marine (2010), a biography by Robert Coram
- Brutes (2015), a novel by Anthony Breznican
- Brutes (2021), a book by Bill Whitten

=== Music ===
- Brute (band), a side project band of guitarist Vic Chesnutt and members of blues-rock band Widespread Panic
- Brute (album), a 2016 protest album by Kuwait musician Fatima Al Qadiri
- "Brute" (song), a single from 1995 album, Nihil, by Hamburg-based, German industrial rock/metal group KMFDM

=== Television ===
- "The Brute", Hawkeye and the Last of the Mohicans episode 17 (1957)

== Transportation ==
- AEV Brute, a compact pickup truck in production since 2011
- British Rail Universal Trolley Equipment (BRUTE), trolleys used from 1964 until 1999

== See also ==
- Brute force (disambiguation)
- Bruting
