= Old, New, Borrowed, and Blue =

Old, New, Borrowed, and Blue may refer to:

- Old New Borrowed and Blue, an album by Slade
- Old, New, Borrowed, and Blue (Paul Carrack album)
- Old, New, Borrowed, and Blue (Roxx Gang album)
