= Money (KMFDM song) =

Single by KMFDM
- B-side: "Bargeld"
- Released: April 28, 1992
- Recorded: Fall 1991 (M.O.B. Studios, Hamburg)
- Genre: Industrial, industrial metal
- Length: 33:47
- Label: Wax Trax! Records
- Songwriter(s): Sascha Konietzko, Klaus Schandelmaier, Günter Schulz
- Producer(s): Sascha Konietzko

KMFDM singles chronology
"Vogue" (1992)	"Money" (1992)	"Help Us—Save Us—Take Us Away" (1992)

"Money" is a song by industrial rock group KMFDM from their 1992 album of the same name. It was released as a single in 1992, and released as a 7" in 2008, as the ninth release of KMFDM's 24/7 series. The song charted at No. 36 in July 1992 on Billboard's Dance/Club Play Songs Chart. The tracks on the single are included on the singles compilation album, Extra, Vol. 1.

== Track listing ==
=== 1992 release ===
No.	Title	Length
1.	"Money (Radio-Mix)"	3:53
2.	"Bargeld (Radio-Mix)"	4:01
3.	"Money (Cover-Charge-Mix)"	6:37
4.	"Bargeld (Rubber-Club-Dub)"	4:27
5.	"Money (Metal-Mix)"	5:57
6.	"Bargeld (Jezebeelzebuttfunk-Mix)"	5:45
7.	"Money (Death-Before-Taxes-Mix)"	3:07
Total length:		33:47

=== 2008 7" reissue ===
No.	Title	Length
1.	"Money (Radio Mix)"	3:50
2.	"Bargeld (Radio Mix)"	4:00
Total length:		7:50

== Personnel ==
- Sascha Konietzko – vocals, bass (1, 3, 5, 7), drums (1, 3, 5, 7), synths (2, 4, 6), programming
- Günter Schulz – guitars
- En Esch – vocals (1, 3, 5, 7)
- Chrissie DeWinter - vocals (1, 3, 5, 7)
- Dorona Alberti - vocals (2, 4, 6)
