= Sucks (song) =

1992 single by KMFDM

Single by KMFDM

from the album Angst
- Released: October 1992
- Recorded: M.O.B. Studios, Hamburg
- Genre: Industrial metal
- Length: 21:26
- Label: Wax Trax!
- Songwriters: Sascha Konietzko, Günter Schulz
- Producer: Sascha Konietzko

KMFDM singles chronology
"Help Us—Save Us—Take Us Away" (1992)	"Sucks" (1992)	"A Drug Against War" (1993)

Audio sample
- "Sucks": file; help

Professional ratings
Review scores
Source	Rating
Allmusic	3/5 stars

"Sucks" is a KMFDM single released in anticipation of their 1993 album Angst. It contains four versions of the song "Sucks" as well as "More 'N' Faster", a reworked version of "More & Faster".

The song includes the lyric "We don't like Michael Jackson, we hate Depeche Mode, we don't care for Madonna or Kylie Minogue", a tongue-in-cheek reference to the various (false) interpretations of the initialism "KMFDM" at the time, including "Kill Mother-Fucking Depeche Mode", "Kidnap Madonna For Drug Money" and "Kylie Minogue Fans Don't Masturbate". The lyrics also include a reference to Tipper Gore and the Parents Music Resource Center labelling albums with Parental Advisory stickers, "Our records have stickers with a warning from Tipper, 'cause they're no good for kids; if we'd get her, we'd strip her."

== Track listing ==
=== 1992 release ===
No.	Title	Length
1.	"Sucks (No Shit-Radio-Mix)"	4:01
2.	"Sucks (P-O-T-A-T-O-Mix)"	3:42
3.	"Sucks (Goodbye Barb-Mix)"	5:21
4.	"Sucks (Original 12"-Mix)"	4:01
5.	"More 'n' Faster" (Only on U.S. release)	4:21
Total length:		21:26

=== 2009 7" reissue ===
No.	Title	Length
1.	"Sucks (12" Mix)"	4:00
2.	"Sucks (Goodbye Barb Mix)"	5:20
Total length:		9:20
