= Beat by Beat by Beat =

Video by KMFDM
- Released: 1997, 2001
- Recorded: 1995–1996
- Genre: Industrial rock
- Label: Wax Trax!/TVT Records

KMFDM chronology
Beat by Beat by Beat (1997)	Sturm & Drang Tour 2002 (2002)

Beat by Beat by Beat is a video released by German industrial rock band KMFDM originally released on VHS by the name Beat by Beat in 1997 and on DVD with its final, longer name in 2001. It features live performances and backstage tour footage from the band's 1995 Beat by Beat tour as well as all seven of the band's videos produced at the time.

== Track list ==
1. Megalomaniac (Video)
2. Intro
3. Flesh (Live)
4. Behind The Scenes Footage
5. Disobedience (Live)
6. A Drug Against War (Video)
7. Money (Video)
8. Behind The Scenes Footage
9. More & Faster (Live)
10. More & Faster (Video)
11. Son of a Gun (Video)
12. Behind The Scenes Footage
13. Vogue (Video)
14. Juke-Joint Jezebel (Manga) (Video)
15. Behind The Scenes Footage
16. Godlike (Live)
17. Behind The Scenes Footage
18. End Titles/Sascha Playing Guitar
19. Naïve (Video)

== Personnel ==
- En Esch – vocals, percussion, guitars
- Sascha Konietzko – vocals, percussion, keyboards
- Günter Schulz – guitars
- Raymond Watts – vocals, guitars
- Mike Jensen – guitars
- Jennifer Ginsberg – backing vocals
- Mark Durante – guest guitars
