= Sarah Nicole Prickett =

Journalist, art critic and editor

- Born: Sarah Nicole Prickett; London, Ontario, Canada
- Occupations: Journalist; critic; editor

Sarah Nicole Prickett is a writer, critic and editor. Her essays and criticism have appeared in Artforum, Bookforum, n+1, and many other publications. She is a regular contributor to Bookforum.

== Career ==
Prickett began her career as a style columnist for Toronto-based alt weeklies and a culture critic for The Globe & Mail. In 2012, she became the contributing editor at The New Inquiry. In 2013, she co-founded the erotic magazine Adult with the creative director Berkley Poole, and served as its editor. In 2016, she joined Real Life, an online magazine about living with technology, as one of its senior editors at launch.

For Artforum, she reviewed a number of films, books, and gallery shows, though it was her reporting from Art Basel Miami Beach that garnered the most attention in the mid-2010s. In March 2014, the magazine published two reviews by her of Lars von Trier's Nymphomaniac, one positive and one negative, in the same issue. In 2017, she wrote weekly recaps of Twin Peaks: The Return, and in 2018 she published the longest essay in the magazine's history, "Serious Sex Battle," on representation of Wonder Woman and competing feminisms of the twentieth century. For Bookforum, she has reviewed books by Joan Didion, Elizabeth Hardwick, William Gass, Henry Green, Janet Malcolm, and Jacqueline Rose.

Prickett has collaborated several times with the painter Nicole Eisenman. In 2020, the two held a public conversation at The Contemporary Austin during Eisenman’s exhibition Sturm und Drang. In 2024, Prickett edited Nicole Eisenman: Maker’s Muck (Hauser & Wirth Publishers), a collection of texts on Eisenman’s sculpture, to which she also contributed. Her essay on Todd Haynes’s film Safe, "She Wants to Belong in Earth", was published in AFM in 2026 with a painting by Eisenman.

== Personal life ==
Prickett was born in London, Ontario, the eldest of five children. She studied journalism without finishing her degree, and lived in Toronto before moving to New York in 2012. In 2014, she married the writer Jesse Barron. By spring 2020, she was in a relationship with the painter Nicole Eisenman. Eisenman painted her that year in Just do it. (Sarah Nicole), and told The New Yorker that Prickett was "new to all this lesbian stuff"; Prickett said that was not exactly true.

== Selected works and writing ==
- "How to get under Aaron Sorkin’s skin (and also, how to high-five properly)", The Globe and Mail, 23 June 2012
- "Why Spring Breakers is the only American movie that matters right now", The Globe and Mail, 29 March 2013
- "How to Make Love in America", Hazlitt, 4 July 2013
- "You Can’t Always Get What You Want", Artforum, March 2014
- "The Ultimate Humiliation", n+1, 30 May 2014
- "The Fake as More", The New Inquiry, 22 July 2014
- "Who Is Marc Jacobs?", T: The New York Times Style Magazine, August 2015
- "The Stanford Letters", n+1, Issue 26, Fall 2016
- "The American Experiment", Bookforum, vol. 24, no. 1
- "A View of Her Own", Bookforum, vol. 24, no. 3
- Twin Peaks: The Return recaps, Artforum, 2017
- "Serious Sex Battle", Artforum, February 2018
- "A Bad Dawn", Artforum, June 2018
- "A Woman Under the Influence", The New Inquiry, 29 October 2018
- Introduction to Gary Indiana, Gone Tomorrow, Seven Stories Press, 2018
- "Magic Mirror", Bookforum, Summer 2019
- "The Story Reteller", Bookforum, Summer 2023
- "Head Like a Hole", Bookforum, Summer 2026
- "My Larval Roommates", The Paris Review, 18 September 2026
- "She Wants to Belong in Earth", AFM, 21 September 2026
