= Light (KMFDM song) =

Single by KMFDM
- Released: February 15, 1994
- Recorded: Chicago Recording Company (1, 7); Bad Animals/Studio X, Seattle (2, 5); Warzone Recorders, Chicago (3, 9); Pig Studios, Beverly Hills (4); Vingo's, Chicago (6, 8)
- Genre: Industrial metal
- Length: 49:13
- Label: Wax Trax! Records/TVT Records
- Songwriter(s): Mark Durante, Sascha Konietzko, Klaus Schandelmaier, Günter Schulz, Chris Shepard
- Producer(s): Sascha Konietzko

KMFDM singles chronology
"A Drug Against War" (1993)	"Light" (1994)	"Glory" (1994)

Professional ratings
Review scores
Source	Rating
Allmusic	3/5 stars

"Light" is a song by industrial rock band KMFDM from their 1993 album Angst. The single was first released in 1994 and contains nine different remixes of the song. "Light" peaked at No. 31 on the Billboard Dance/Club Play Songs Chart in May 1994. The single was re-released as a 7" in 2009, and the song was remixed and released as "Light 2010" on December 17, 2010.

== Track listing ==
=== 1994 CD release ===
No.	Title	Remixer	Length
1.	"Light" (Cellulite Radio Dub)	KMFDM	3:49
2.	"Light" (Aerobic Dub)	Excessive Force	5:44
3.	"Light" (Rubber Gloves Dub)	Die Warzau	5:24
4.	"Light" (Fat Back Dub)	Nine Inch Nails	7:29
5.	"Light" (Vengeance Dub)	Son of a Gun	5:39
6.	"Light" (Cømplete Ørgasm Dub)	Crunch-Ø-Matic	4:57
7.	"Light" (Diet Dub)	KMFDM	5:58
8.	"Light" (Lighthouse Dub)	Vince Lawrence	5:04
9.	"Light" (White Cotton Balls Dub)	Die Warzau	5:09
Total length:			49:13

=== 1994 and 2014 12" release ===
No.	Title	Remixer	Length
1.	"Light" (Aerobic Dub)	Excessive Force	5:44
2.	"Light" (Rubber Gloves)	Die Warzau	5:24
3.	"Light" (Fat Back Dub)	Nine Inch Nails	7:29
4.	"Light" (Vengeance Dub)	Son of a Gun	5:39
Total length:			24:16

=== 2009 7" release ===
No.	Title	Length
1.	"Light"	6:05
2.	"Light" (Cellulite Radio Mix)	3:48
Total length:		9:53

=== Light 2010 ===
No.	Title	Remixer	Length
1.	"Light 2010"	KMFDM	6:07
2.	"Light 2010" (Ultra-Heavy Frequency Mix)	Lords of Acid	5:26
3.	"Light 2010" (Into the Wasteland Mix)	Emzy Enzy	7:50
4.	"Light 2010" (Dilated Mix)	David J	6:15
5.	"Light 2010" (Fashionista Mix)	3KSK	4:53
Total length:			30:31

== Personnel ==
- Sascha Konietzko – vocals, bass, synths, programming, mixing
- Günter Schulz – guitars
- En Esch – vocals
- Mark Durante – guitars
- Dorona Alberti – vocals

=== Additional personnel ===
- William Rieflin - additional guitars (2), additional drums (2)
- Jim Marcus - additional programming (3, 9)
- Jason McNinch - engineering (3, 9)
- Matt Warren - assistant engineering (3, 9)
- Trent Reznor - mixing (4)
- Dick Tater - drums (5)
- Van Detta - additional programming (5)
- Arron Leverenz - bass (6)
- Burle Avant - mixing, production (6)
- Eric Zimmermann - mixing, production (6)
- Kevon Smith - guitar (8)
- Liz Conant - keyboards (8)
- Ron Gresham - mixing (8)
- Vince Lawrence - additional programming (8)

=== Production ===
- Chris Shepard – recording, engineering, mixing
- Sam Hofstedt - assistant engineering (2, 5)
- Chris Vrenna - assistant engineering (4)
- Vince Lawrence - engineering (6, 8), mixing (8)
