= Excessive Force (disambiguation) =

Excessive Force is a musical project started by Sascha Konietzko.

Excessive Force may also refer to:

- A form of police brutality
- Excessive Force (film), a 1993 American action film
- "Excessive Force" (Daredevil: Born Again), an episode of Daredevil: Born Again

== See also ==
- Proportionality (law)
- Use of force continuum
