= Opium (KMFDM album) =

Demo album by KMFDM
- Released: 1984 (demo), 2002
- Recorded: June 1984
- Studios: Pft Brd, Blankenese
- Genres: Industrial; experimental
- Length: 43:49
- Label: Firstworld

KMFDM chronology
Opium (1984)	What Do You Know, Deutschland? (1986)

Opium is a demo album by German industrial band KMFDM released as a cassette in 1984, and officially released as a CD in 2002 by Firstworld. It is one of only two KMFDM studio albums (the other being Nihil) that does not feature cover artwork by pop artist Brute!. The artwork contains a picture of Irina Gorbachev, the daughter of Mikhail Gorbachev, to whom the band wrote a letter asking for a visit to Moscow.

== Release ==
Opium is said to have originally been released in a limited run of cassettes and distributed through the Hamburg club scene in 1984. In the early 2000s, the original 8-track tapes were salvaged from a house, after surviving a fire and years of sitting in damp boxes. This had left them in a damaged state. Sascha Konietzko said that he salvaged what information was still intact on the tapes, and then set about re-creating the tracks. This included reprogramming drums on some tracks with the original sounds, or sounds close to the original. In a 2007 interview with Outburn Magazine, Konietzko said the Opium remaster "...is going to provide the missing link to 'Where did KMFDM even come from in the first place?'. If you begin with What Do You Know, Deutschland? you kind of skip the first part."

However, during an online feud in 2022 between Konietzko and Raymond Watts, Watts claimed that "contrary to bullshit myth making stories about fires and lost tapes, Opium was recorded in the mid 90s by Bill Rieflin, Konietzko and me." Neither he nor Konietzko have commented further about the album, so its true origins remain unconfirmed.

== Track listing ==
All tracks are written by KMFDM

No.	Title	Length
1.	"Fix Me Up"	3:40
2.	"Splatter"	3:51
3.	"The Smell"	4:06
4.	"Helmut Mein Helmut"	4:44
5.	"Warp'd"	2:35
6.	"Penetration"	4:10
7.	"Entschuldigung"	3:43
8.	"Cuntboy"	6:09
9.	"RAF OK"	4:25
10.	"Mating Sounds of Helicopters"	6:26
Total length:		43:49

== Personnel ==
- Sascha Konietzko – bass, vocals, guitar, synths, programming
- Raymond Watts – vocals, programming
- Ton Geist – additional guitars
