= Storm and Stress (disambiguation) =

Storm and Stress is the English translation of Sturm und Drang, a German literary movement that emphasized the volatile emotional life of the individual

Storm and Stress or Sturm und Drang may also refer to:

== Sturm und Drang ==
- Sturm und Drang (play), the original play by Friedrich Maximilian von Klinger to give the name to the movement
- Sturm und Drang (band), hard rock band from Vaasa, Finland
- Sturm & Drang Tour 2002, live album by KMFDM from a tour with the same name

- Sturm & Drang Tour 2002 (video), live DVD by KMFDM

- VII: Sturm und Drang, 2015 studio album by Lamb of God

== Storm and Stress ==
- Storm & Stress, American band

- Storm & Stress (album), debut album of the band
