= Old, New, Borrowed, and Blue (Paul Carrack album) =

Old, New, Borrowed and Blue

Studio album by Paul Carrack
- Released: 2007
- Genres: Pop rock; soft rock
- Length: 49:14
- Label: Carrack-UK
- Producers: Paul Carrack; Gare du Nord; Hervé Martens; Peter Van Hooke

Paul Carrack chronology
Winter Wonderland (2005)	Old, New, Borrowed and Blue (2007)	I Know That Name (2008)

Old, New, Borrowed, and Blue is the eleventh solo studio album by the English singer-songwriter Paul Carrack. It was originally released in 2007 on Carrack's own Carrack-UK label.

As the title implies, the album is a mixture of recordings of various vintages—some old, some new—cover (i.e., "borrowed") songs, and songs that have a soul or blues influence. Two songs are re-mixes of Carrack originals, originally from his 1996 album Blue Views. Track 4 was recorded with the Belgian jazz duo Gare du Nord and initially issued on their 2007 album Sex 'N' Jazz. Other songs are outtakes from earlier album projects, songs recorded for tribute albums, and newly recorded tracks.

== Track listing ==
No.	Title	Writer(s)	Length
1.	"What's Shakin' On The Hill?"	Nick Lowe	3:30
2.	"Raining Raining"	Lowe	2:57
3.	"Don't Dream It's Over"	Neil Finn	2:55
4.	"Ride On"	Ferdi Lancee, Barend Fransen, Paul Carrack	3:45
5.	"What’s Going On"	Marvin Gaye, Al Cleveland, Ronaldo Benson	3:36
6.	"Ain't That Peculiar"	Smokey Robinson, Warren Moore, Bobby Rogers, Marv Tarplin	3:02
7.	"I Live On A Battlefield"	Carrack, Lowe	4:23
8.	"Love Will Keep Us Alive" (duet with Lindsay Dracass)	Carrack, Peter Vale, Jim Capaldi	3:34
9.	"Always Have, Always Will" (2007 remix)	Carrack, Brenda Russell, Mark Cawley	5:21
10.	"Girl"	John Lennon, Paul McCartney	2:12
11.	"The Reason Was You"	Carrack, Chris Antblad	4:03
12.	"No Easy Way Out" (2007 remix)	Carrack	5:25
13.	"Help Me Make It Through The Night"	Kris Kristofferson	4:31

== Personnel ==
- Paul Carrack – vocals, all other instruments (1, 2, 3, 5, 6, 7, 9, 13), all instruments (10), keyboards (11, 12)
- Emiel van Rijthoven – keyboards (4)
- Gare du Nord (Ferdi Lancee & Barend Fransen) – all other instruments (4)
- Hervé Martens – keyboards (8), original arrangements (8)
- Rod Argent – keyboards (11, 12)
- Nigel Bates – guitars (3)
- "Little" Chris Pocino – guitars (8)
- Robbie McIntosh – guitars (11, 12)
- Tim Renwick – guitars (11, 12)
- Roberto Mercurio – bass guitar (8)
- Pino Palladino – bass guitar (11, 12)
- Joris Peeters – drums (8)
- Andy Newmark – drums (11, 12)
- Steve Beighton – saxophones (1, 2, 5, 6, 7, 9)
- Ed Collins – trumpet (2, 6, 7, 9)
- Bob Loveday – violin (13)
- Gyuri Spies – string arrangements (8)
- Dirk Brossé – string conductor (8)
- Lindsay Dracass – vocals (8)
- Katie Kisson – backing vocals (11, 12)
- Tessa Niles – backing vocals (11, 12)

Production

- Paul Carrack – producer (1, 2, 3, 5–13)
- Gare du Nord (Ferdi Lancee & Barend Fransen) – producers (4)
- Hervé Martens – original production (8)
- Peter Van Hooke – original production (9, 12)
- Nigel Bates – mixing, mastering
- Jan Servaes – string recording (8)
- Ian Ross – design, album concept
- Deborah Stone – front cover photography, photography on pages 4 & 9
- Danny Clifford – inlay photography, photography on pages 6 & 7
