= Slammin' Watusis =

Musical group

- Slammin' Watusis, 1988

Background information
- Origin: Chicago, Illinois
- Genres: Hard rock, alternative rock, punk rock, heavy metal
- Years active: 1985–1990
- Labels: Epic Records
- Past members: Lee Popa; Mark Durante; Frank Raven; Clay Watusi; Benny Saffire

Slammin' Watusis was an American punk rock and heavy metal group. They signed a record deal with CBS Records in 1987, which resulted in two albums, a self-titled debut album in 1988 and Kings of Noise in 1989. Both albums were released by Epic Records.

They were influenced by Kiss, The Dickies, The Damned, Jackie McClean, Jimmy Reed, and Francis the Talking Mule.

The band had five members: lead singer and guitarist Lee Popa, guitarist Mark Durante, wind instruments Frank Raven, bassist Clay Watusi, and drummer Benny Saffire.

A spinoff band, The Blue Watusis, was formed to play a more blues-oriented sound.
