= Sturm & Drang Tour 2002 (video) =

Sturm & Drang Tour 2002 DVD

Video by KMFDM
- Released: 2002
- Recorded: 2001–2002
- Genre: Industrial
- Label: Wax Trax!

KMFDM chronology
Beat by Beat by Beat (1997)	Sturm & Drang Tour 2002 DVD (2002)	20th Anniversary World Tour 2004 (2005)

Sturm & Drang Tour 2002 is a live DVD documenting KMFDM's Sturm & Drang Tour of 2002 in support of the album Attak. It was the first tour after the band reunited following a 1999 split. It was rated three stars by AllMusic.

== Track listing ==
1. "D.I.Y."
2. "Attak/Reload"
3. "Dirty"
4. "Ultra"
5. "Boots"
6. "Yohoho"
7. "Rules (ft. Chris Connelly)"
8. "Find it Fuck it Forget it"
9. "Sturm & Drang"
10. "Megalomaniac"
11. "Flesh"
12. "Wrath"
13. "Godlike (ft. Mark Durante)"
14. "Spit Sperm"

== Personnel ==
- Raymond Watts – vocals, guitars
- Sascha Konietzko – vocals, percussion, samplers, synthesizers
- Lucia Cifarelli – vocals, ninja-sidstation
- Steve White - guitars
- Jules Hodgson – guitars
- Bill Rieflin – bass
- Andy Selway – drums

=== Guest appearances ===
- Chris Connelly - vocals
- Mark Durante - guitars
