= Gare du Nord (band) =

Dutch-Belgian jazz band

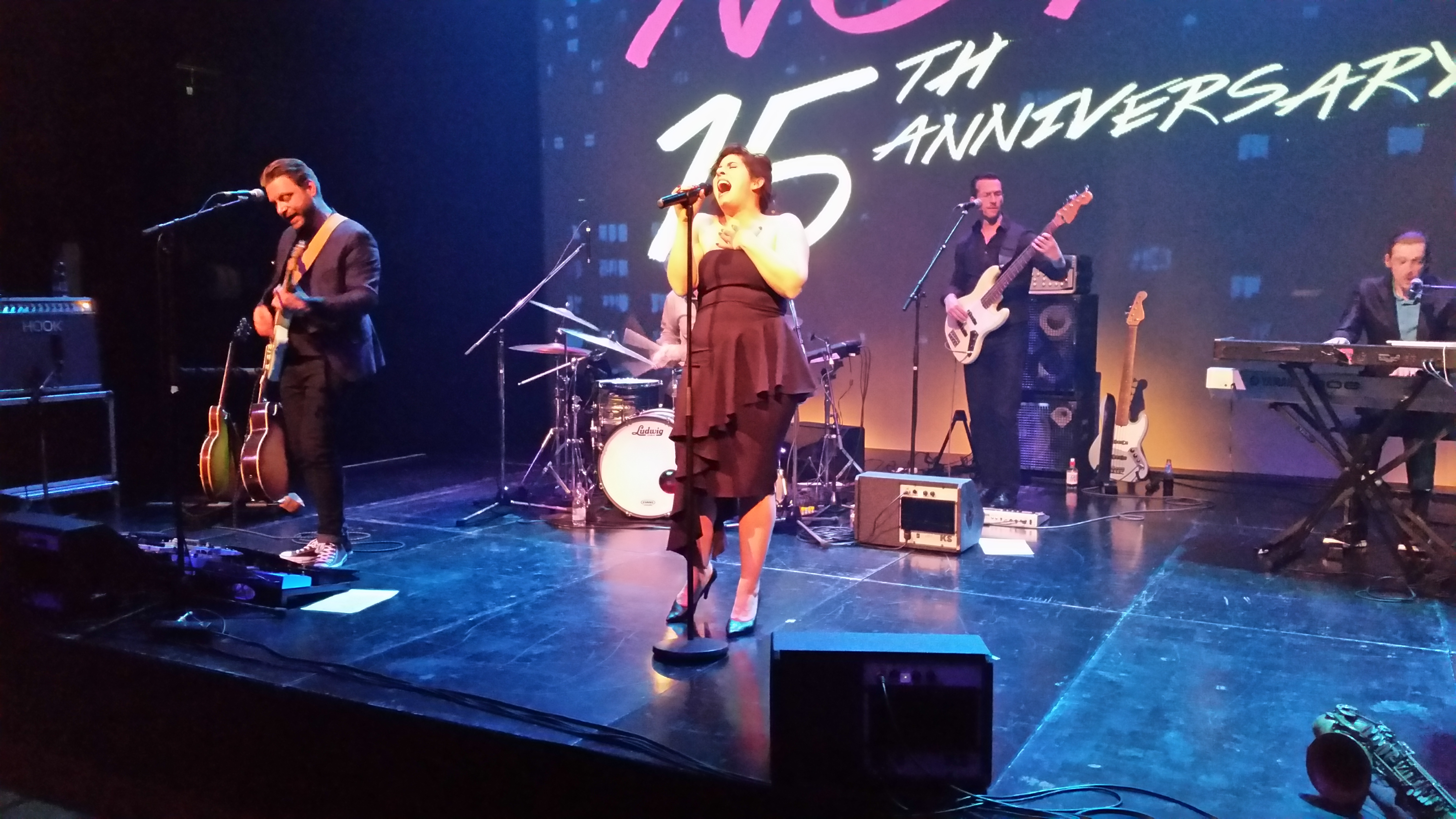
Dorona Alberti with Gare du Nord in 2017

Gare du Nord is a Dutch-Belgian jazz band, originally consisting of Doc (Ferdi Lancee) and Inca (Barend Fransen). Doc played guitar and Inca played saxophone, while both performed vocal duties. After the pair split up in 2013, the band continued to work and tour with a different line-up.

== History ==
=== 2001–2005 ===
Dutch guitarist Ferdi Lancee (real name: Ferdy Dousenbach, born October 21, 1953, in Tilburg) and saxophone player Barend Fransen (born January 4, 1959, in Helmond) started working together in 2001, when they started writing lounge music in Belgium. They signed a record deal with Play It Again Sam Records in Brussels, and released the albums (In Search Of) Excellounge (2001) and Kind Of Cool (2002). Several of their songs were used in the soundtracks of the TV series Six Feet Under and the movie Ghost Rider (2007). In 2003, Gare du Nord toured the Netherlands and Russia with a newly formed band consisting of nine musicians. Their third album Club Gare du Nord (2005) was recorded in their own Cell4-Studio in the Netherlands. French Jazz trumpet player Erik Truffaz and the gospel singers of the American Imani Fellowship Choir contributed to the album. Around that date (2005), Barend Fransen left his job as president of the Dutch record store chain "Van Leest" to spend more time with the band.

=== 2006 ===
On January 12, 2006, during Eurosonic in Groningen, the Underground Station Tour 2006 of Gare du Nord started. The jazz duo made the soundtrack for Stout, a book by Heleen van Royen and Marlies Dekkers.

=== 2007–2008 ===
Gare du Nord recorded the single "Ride On" with British singer Paul Carrack. This song appears on their fourth album, Sex 'n' Jazz (2007). The album is the first part of a so-called "love trilogy". In addition to Carrack, the album was supported with vocals by Dutch singer Dorona Alberti, as well as soul singer Marvin Gaye in the song "You're My Medicine". The song can be heard in Sexual Healing, an American biographical movie from director Lauren Goodman about the last years of Marvin Gaye's life. The song was also released as a single. On April 28, Gare du Nord received a golden record for their debut album (In Search Of) Excellounge. In late 2007, Gare du Nord went on the Theatre Tour Sex 'n' Jazz. Sales of Sex 'n' Jazz earned the duo a second golden record in October 2007, handed out by fashion designer Marlies Dekkers. On October 15, a Gold Edition of Sex 'n' Jazz was released containing six newly recorded tracks.

=== 2009 ===
The second part of the love trilogy, entitled Love for Lunch, was released in May 2009, again with a cover designed by Marlies Dekkers. "Dish of the Day", the second track of the album, became a single. Track 3 of the album is Gare du Nord's interpretation of the "Summertime" jazz standard.

=== 2011 ===
The band Gare du Nord separated from the project Gare du Nord and would go on to perform on stage without Ferdi or Barend, who were going to focus on the new album and a movie.

On October 3, 2011, the new album Lilywhite Soul was presented in Amsterdam, again on the Blue Note label. This album contains a cover of Lou Reed's "Perfect Day".

=== 2012 ===
Two songs (a remake of "Pablo's Blues" and a new song "Tarantino's Tango") are submitted for the new Quentin Tarantino movie Django Unchained. These songs are also present on a new soundtrack album, called Rendezvous 8:02 released on June 4. In October 2012 the first live album is released, entitled Lifesexy. The release turns out to be the very last album that Barend and Ferdi work on as a creative team

=== 2013 ===
Barend and Ferdi split and go separate ways; Ferdi quit the public music business and Barend set up a completely new live band together with singer Dorona Alberti and guitarist Aron Raams. By the end of 2013 Universal Music releases the 3-CD box Collected. The box with a career overview of the band reaches the Top 10 in the Dutch Album charts.

=== 2014 ===
The new Gare du Nord band tours the Netherlands for the 35 City Live Tour. The shows feature guest appearances by classical harpist Lavinia Meijer. In January 2014 Lavinia Meijer presents a multi platinum award for the Sex 'n' Jazz album, a platinum award for Love For Lunch and a gold award for Lilywhite Soul to the band in a fully packed Muziekgebouw Eindhoven. Songwriter Barend Fransen starts writing new songs with several contemporary composers for a new 10-song songcycle to be premiered live on stage as Gare du Nord: Undressed for a clubtour kicking of October 5, 2014.

== Discography ==
Studio albums

- (In search of) Excellounge (2001)
- Kind of Cool (2002)
- Club Gare Du Nord (2005)
- Sex 'n' Jazz (2007)
- Jazz in the City (2007)
- Love for lunch (2009)
- Lilywhite Soul (2011)
- Rendezvous 8:02 (2012)
- Stronger! (2015)

Compilations

- How Was It for You (2004)
- Let's Have a Ball! (2010)
- Greatest Hits (2010)
- Collected (2013)
- Fresh from the Can (2018)
