= Conquer Your World =

Studio album by Excessive Force
- Released: December 12, 1991
- Recorded: 1991
- Genre: Industrial
- Length: 44:19
- Label: Wax Trax! Records

Excessive Force chronology
Conquer Your World (1991)	Gentle Death (1993)

Professional ratings
Review scores
Source	Rating
Allmusic	3.5/5 stars

Conquer Your World is a 1991 album by Excessive Force, a side project of KMFDM and My Life with the Thrill Kill Kult. After this release, Buzz McCoy no longer worked with Excessive Force. On November 6, 2007, this album was re-released with remastered audio and with the "Conquer Your House" single as bonus tracks. It also featured different cover art.

== Track listing ==
No.	Title	Length
1.	"Conquer Your House II"	4:55
2.	"Conquer Your World"	6:32
3.	"Blow Your House Down"	4:51
4.	"To Death II"	3:31
5.	"Ride the Bomb"	5:04
6.	"We Like War"	6:32
7.	"Worship Me"	3:24
8.	"Finger on the Trigger"	4:29
Total length:		39:17

CD-only track
No.	Title	Length
9.	"Conquer Your House III"	5:02
Total length:		44:19

2007 reissue bonus tracks
No.	Title	Length
10.	"Conquer Your House"	6:31
11.	"To Death"	5:44
12.	"Stupid Man"	4:12
Total length:		60:46

== Personnel ==
- Sascha Konietzko – vocals, programming, bass (8)
- Buzz McCoy – bass, programming
- Reverend A Chester – vocals (7)
- Jacky Blacque – vocals
- En Esch – drums (8)
- Svetlana Ambrosius – guitars
