= Razed in Black =

American electronic music band

- Origin: ʻEwa Beach, Hawaii, U.S.
- Genres: Electro-industrial; industrial rock; electronica; futurepop
- Years active: 1994–present
- Labels: Cleopatra, Hypnotic, Underground, Inc.
- Members: Romell Regulacion; Ivan Delaforce; Phil Guerrero
- Past members: Chris Nelson; Raj Kapololu
- Website: razedinblack.net

Razed in Black is an electronic music act created by Romell Regulacion (vocals, rhythm guitar, keyboards) and supported in live performances by drummer Ivan Delaforce and lead guitarist Phil Guerrero. The band was formed in Hawaii in 1994 and signed to Cleopatra Records in the following year, before later moving to Jacksonville, Florida. Razed in Black's music combines elements of industrial, synthpop, dark wave, gothic rock, and hardcore techno.

Mostly an underground act, Razed in Black have had songs featured on television shows like Homicide: Life on the Street, in movies, and in videogames.

Regulacion has also released material under the names DJ R<I>B, DJ Skooby, and Transmutator. Transmutator incorporates more techno and hard electro/beat elements in its musical style, while Razed in Black has more lyrically-based songs with a darker tone and a heavier pop/rock influence.

== Discography ==
=== Albums ===
- Shrieks, Laments, and Anguished Cries (1996)
- Overflow (1997)
- Funky Disco EP (1997) (as Transmutator)
- Take Over (1997) (as Transmutator)
- The Colony of Sluts (1999) (as Transmutator)
- Sacrificed (1999) – #24 CMJ RPM Charts
- Oh My Goth! EP (2001)
- Damaged (2003)
- Share This Poison – Retrospective (2012)

=== Compilations and remixes ===
Compilation appearances
- Covered in Black—An Industrial Tribute to the Kings of High Voltage AC/DC (1997) (song: "Hell's Bells")
- The Blackest Album: An Industrial Tribute to Metallica (1998) (song: "The Thing That Should Not Be")
- 100 Tears—A Tribute to The Cure (1999) (song: "Disintegration")
- Covered In Nails: A Tribute to Nine Inch Nails (2000) (song: "Starfuckers, Inc.")
- Virgin Voices: A Tribute to Madonna (Volume 2) (2000) (song: "Erotica" by Razed in Black vs. Transmutator)
- Don't Blow Your Cover: A Tribute to KMFDM (2000) (song: "A Drug Against War")
- The Blackest Album 3: An Industrial Tribute to Metallica (2001) (song: "Welcome Home (Sanitarium)")
- A Tribute to New Order (2001) (song: "Everything's Gone Green")
- A Gothic-Industrial Tribute to The Smashing Pumpkins (2001) (song: "Cherub Rock")
- A Tribute to Nine Inch Nails: Re-Covered in Nails (2001) (song: "Sin")
- Dig It—Hymns of the Worlock: A Tribute to Skinny Puppy (2003) (song: "Assimilate")
- Electrocured—An Electro Tribute to The Cure (2004) (song: "Disintegration")
- Dark Trance vs. Neogoth Vol. 1 (2005) (song: "Blush V.2"
- Apocalypse Now 1 (EuroMedia SPV 088-38752) (song: "Metamorphosis")
- Cyberl@b (Nuclear Blast NB 27361-63132) (song: "Overflow")
- Cyberl@b Version 2 (alpha Matrix EFA 23205) (song: "Never Meant")
- Cyberl@b Version 3 (Matrix Cube TRI 042 cd) (song: "Oh My Goth!" (trance mix))
- Cryonica Tanz v.1 (Cryonica CRY CD 001) (song: "Nightmare")
- Cryonica Tanz v.2 (Cryonica CRY CD 003) (song: "Share This Poison")
- Elektro-Industrial Sounds of the Northwest (CLEO 9593-2) (song: "Metamorphosis")
- Elektrauma Vol. 4 (TRITON RECORDS (Europe) 13 CD) (song: "Master" (Painful edit))
- Future Wave (CLP 0199-2) (song: "I've Suffered Long Enough")
- Gothic Vampires/Covered in Goth (CLP 0957-2) (song: "Disintegration")
- Graver's Paradise (Hot Topic compilation) (song: "Blush")
- Hypnotic State (CLP 0111) (song: "Cyberium" (Mutation mix))
- I Hear Ya! (Caroline 1996) (song: "Cyberium" (On Speed mix))
- I Hear Ya! 1999 (Caroline 1999) (song: "Master")
- Industrial Revolution 3 (Cleopatra CLP 9732-2) (song: "What's Fair?" (Agony mix))
- Industrial Revolution: The Very Best of Industrial Revolution (Cleopatra CLP 0838-2) (song: "What's Fair?" (Agony mix))
- Industrial Madness Massive 4-CD set (CLP 0045) (song: "What's Fair?" (Frustration mix))
- New Dark Noise (Cleopatra/Hot Topic) (song: "Better Off")
- Signal to Noise (Cleo 1147-2) (songs: "Come to Daddy", "More Human")
- Soundline Sampler #3 (Sideline magazine SIDELINE 003) (song: "Cyberium" (On Speed mix))
- Taste of Sin (Cleopatra CLP 1167-2) (song: "Oh My Goth!")
- This Is Goth (Cleopatra CLP 0845-2) (song: "Oh My Goth!")
- This Is Industrial (Cleopatra CLP 0691-2) (song: "Master")
- Trancespotting IV (Hypnotic CLP 1158) (song: "Oh My Goth!" (trance mix))
- Wired Injections (Cleopatra CLEO 9675-2) (song: "Cyberium (On Speed mix))
Remixes for other artists
- Aiboforcen: "Not Unique (Razed In Black remix)" psychosomeatically unique: Alfa-Matrix am3005-DJ
- Afterchain: "Corporate Reality (Razed In Black remix)"
- Ayria: "Disease (Razed In Black remix)" Square Matrix v.4: Alfa-Matrix am1039
- Berlin: "Pleasure Victim (Razed In Black remix)" The Greatest Hits Remixed: Cleopatra CLP 0760-2
- Birmingham 6: "Policestate (Razed In Black remix)" To Protect and to Serve: Cleopatra CLEO 9659-2
- Birmingham 6: "Accept Reality! (Razed In Black remix)" Mixed Judgements (US): Zoth Ommog CD Zot 229
- Bow Wow Wow: "I Want Candy (Razed In Black remix)" Wild in the U.S.A.: Cleopatra CLP 0424-2
- Celldweller: "Frozen (DJ RiB Remix)" Frozen/Goodbye Remixes
- Crüxshadows: "Cassandra (Razed In Black remix)" Fortress In Flames: Dancing Ferret Records 724
- Cheap Trick: "Dream Police (Razed In Black f/Kelly Hanson of Hurricane A Tribute to ...: Cleopatra CLP 0786-2
- The Damned: "Shadow to Fall (Razed In Black Mix)" Testify: Cleopatra CLP9899-2
- Digi Wni: "No Future" (and 4 other tracks) EP: Dolphin Entertainment JAPAN: BLCK – 85984
- Digi Wni: "No Future" (and 10 other tracks) LP: Dolphin Entertainment JAPAN: BLCK – 86015
- Diverje: "To Hell (Razed In Black remix)" Digital 6 Focus A: DSBP Productions DSBP 1014 Existence-Program Remix: DSBP Productions DSBP 1019
- Electric Hellfire Club: "Prince Of Darkness (Razed In Black remix)" Unholy Roller: Cleopatra CLP 0235-6
- Gene Loves Jezebel: "Always a Flame (Razed IN Black remix) Desire: Cleopatra CLP 0377-2
- Genitorturers: "4 Walls Black (Razed In Black remix)" Machine Love: Cleopatra CLP 0735-2
- Emergence: "BluMuse (Razed In Black remix)" Romell produced their debut EP as well. Scarred EP: Self Released
- Implant: "Engine No. 9 (Razed In Black remix)" Komputer: Triton Records (Europe)
- Implant: "Too Many Puppies (Razed In Black remix)" Self-Inflicted: Alfa-Matrix am 7252
- Inertia: "Angel (Razed In Black remix)" Positive Angel: Cryonica Records (Europe) nightCD035
- Information Society: "Going, Going ... Gone! (Razed In Black remix)" Insoc Recombinant: Cleopatra CLP 0490-2
- Internal: "Information (Razed In Black remix)" Information: Sideline Records (Europe)
- Jim Morrison: "Trespass (Razed In Black remix)" Electronic Proclamations of a Wild Child: Morpheus Ozit C00070 (Europe)
- Matthew Grim: "Electric Avenue (Razed In Black remix)" Epic 98: Epic Records Epic 9
- Missing Persons: "Walking in LA (Razed In Black remix)" Remixed Hits: Cleopatra CLP 0609-2
- MMTM: "ESP (Razed In Black remix)" Binary Sex: Underground, Inc.:UN1077
- Mnemonic: "Labyrinth (Razed In Black remix)" Alfa-Matrix: Limited Edition Packaging – Indentistorüng
- Neotek: "Suicide (Razed In Black remix)" Brain Over Muscle ~ Deluxe: Zoth Ommog/Cleopatra clp 1375-2
- Neikka RPM: "Bound by Sympathy (Razed In Black remix)" Square Matrix 03: Alfa-Matrix Records
- New Mind: "Lightning Zone (Razed In Black remix)" The Zone: Out of Line Records
- Pygmy Children: "Intensify (Razed In Black remix)" Industrial Mix Machine: Cleopatra CLP 9969
- Razed In A New Division Of Agony: "Shadowplay (Razed In Black Remix)" – Joy Division cover
- Regenerator: "Blink (Razed In Black remix)" Regenerated X: WTII Records
- Shunt: "White Skin (Razed In Black remix)" Romell also appears on this album as a guest guitarist Profane Groove: 21st Circuitry 21C 39
- Soil & Eclipse: "Fields of Stone (Razed In Black remix)" This album also produced by Romell Necromancy: Cop Int'l Records- COPCD 033
- Soil & Eclipse: "Poetry of Angels (Razed In Black remix)" Archetype: Cop Int'l Records- COPCD 055
- Soil & Eclipse: "Sentence Me (Razed In Black remix)" Purity: Cop Int'l Records- COPCD
- Sonic Adventure Remix "Open Your Heart" (Transmutator vs. Razed in Black) (1998)
- Sonic The Hedgehog: Remix Adventure Contains Razed In Black collaboration with Corey Glover of Living Color Toshiba/EMI TOCP-65024
- Switchblade Symphony: "Clown (Razed In Black remix)" Drool: Cleopatra CLP 0042-2
- Warrant: "Down Boys (Razed In Black remix)" Greatest & Latest: Deadline Records CLP 0694-2
- UV: "Dementia (Razed In Black remix)" Album also Mastered by Romell: BLC Productions

== Appearances in movies, television, and video games ==
- The Rage: Carrie 2 features "What's Fair?" by Razed in Black & "My Wonderful Friend" by Transmutator during the movie but was not included on the official soundtrack.
- Ginger Snaps features "Overflow", not included on official soundtrack
- The independent film Strange Life: The Breech features "I've Suffered Long Enough"
- The WB's Mission Hill features music by Razed in Black
- NBC's Homicide: Life on the Street features music by Razed In Black
- "Pursuit," "Future Unknown," "Power", and "Cyberium (Endurance Mix)", from Shrieks, Laments and Anguished Cries, appear in the 1997 THQ fighting video game Vs.
- The first episode of the television series Hellcats features their cover of Bow Wow Wow's "I Want Candy".
- A version of "Visions" with the intro omitted was featured in Tony Hawk's Downhill Jam.
