= Brute force =

Brute Force or brute force may refer to:

== Techniques ==
- Brute force method or proof by exhaustion, a method of mathematical proof
- Brute-force attack, a cryptanalytic attack
- Brute-force search, a computer problem-solving technique

== People ==
- Brute Force (musician) (born 1940), American singer and songwriter

== Arts and entertainment ==
=== Film ===
- Brute Force (1914 film), a short silent drama directed by D. W. Griffith
- Brute Force (1947 film), a film noir directed by Jules Dassin

=== Literature ===
- Brute Force, a 2008 Nick Stone Missions novel by Andy McNab
- Brute Force (Ellis book), a 1990 book by the historian John Ellis
- Brute Force: Cracking the Data Encryption Standard, a 2005 book by Matt Curtin

=== Other media ===
- Brute Force (album), a 2016 record by the Algorithm
- Brute Force (comics), a comic by Simon Furman
- Brute Force (video game), a 2003 third-person shooter

== See also ==
- Force (disambiguation)
- Brute (disambiguation)
- Fôrça Bruta, a 1970 album by Jorge Ben
