= Brute (comics) =

Brute, in comics, may refer to:

- Marvel Comics:
  - Brute (Morlocks), one of the lesser known Morlocks in the main Marvel universe
  - Brute (Reed Richards), the name of an alternative Earth version of Mister Fantastic who became a member of the Frightful Four on True Earth
- DC Comics:
  - Brute, a soldier character in the series Hunter's Hellcats
  - Brute (Sandman), a character in the series The Sandman
  - Brute, the black haired member of the Powerpunk Girls, a trio of the Powerpuff Girls' alternative characters from the DC comics Powerpuff Girls
  - Brute, an antagonist who has appeared in Superman comics arresting him for the Tribunal Planet. He is the brother of Mope
  - Brute, a villain and a member of the Extremists
- Brute (Atlas/Seaboard), a Hulk-like character from former Marvel Comics publisher Martin Goodman's Atlas/Seaboard Comics
- Brute, an Image Comics character from Savage Dragon and a member of the Vicious Circle

== See also ==
- Brute (disambiguation)
