= Vogue (KMFDM song) =

Single by KMFDM
- B-side: "Sex on the Flag"
- Released: January 8, 1992
- Recorded: ???
- Genre: Industrial, Industrial dance
- Length: 19:54
- Label: Wax Trax! Records
- Songwriter(s): Sascha Konietzko, Klaus Schandelmaier, Günter Schulz
- Producer(s): ???

KMFDM singles chronology
"Split" (1991)	"Vogue" (1992)	"Money" (1992)

Professional ratings
Review scores
Source	Rating
Allmusic	3/5 stars

"Vogue" is a song by industrial rock band KMFDM from their 1992 album Money. The song hit No. 19 on Billboard's Dance/Club Play Songs chart in May 1992. The tracks on the single are also included on the singles compilation album, Extra, Vol. 1. The single version is an extended 12" mix that differs from the album version, featuring more guitar-work.

== Track listing ==
All songs written and composed by Sascha Konietzko unless otherwise noted.

=== 1992 release ===
No.	Title	Length
1.	"Vogue"	5:43
2.	"Sex on the Flag"	4:04
3.	"Split—Apart" (En Esch, Konietzko)	4:29
4.	"Split (Mirrorball Mix)" (Esch, Konietzko)	5:38
Total length:		19:54

=== 2008 7" reissue ===
No.	Title	Length
1.	"Vogue (12" Mix)"	5:30
2.	"Sex on the Flag (12" Mix)"	3:52
Total length:		9:22

== Personnel ==
- Dorona Alberti – vocals
- En Esch – vocals (1, 3, 4)
- Sascha Konietzko – vocals, bass, synths, programming
- Günter Schulz – guitars
