= Money (album) =

Studio album by KMFDM
- Released: February 1992
- Recorded: 1991
- Studios: M.O.B. Studios, Hamburg
- Genres: Industrial rock; electro-industrial
- Length: 43:36
- Label: Wax Trax!
- Producer: Sascha Konietzko

KMFDM chronology
Naïve (1990)	Money (1992)	Angst (1993)

Singles from Money
- 1. "Split" Released: 25 June 1991; 2. "Vogue" Released: 8 January 1992; 3. "Money" Released: 28 April 1992; 4. "Help Us—Save Us—Take Us Away" Released: 15 September 1992

Money is the fifth studio album by German industrial band KMFDM, released in February 1992 by Wax Trax! Records. It was originally intended to be titled Apart, with each of the two core members, Sascha Konietzko and En Esch, recording half an album and combining their work. The album ended up using only Konietzko's half, along with additional songs. It received mixed reviews, but spawned a number of club hits. It went out of print in the late 1990s and was re-released in 2006.

== History ==
Bandmates Sascha Konietzko and En Esch had a falling out at the end of their 1990 tour with My Life with the Thrill Kill Kult. Each was given the funds to record one side of their next (and presumed final, at the time) album, Apart. Both worked in the same Hamburg studio, M.O.B., with engineer Blank Fontana and guitarist Günter Schulz, but never interacted with each other directly. These sessions would be the last time the group worked with Fontana at M.O.B.

After the two halves were combined and pressed onto an album, Esch's half was rejected by Wax Trax! Records's executives, who didn't think it sounded like KMFDM. The record company gave Konietzko additional funds to record more songs. He finished the album by including new remixes of previously released material. After yet another tracklist revision by Konietzko, he changed the title to Money, and later reconciled with Esch in the later stages of the album's production. A number of other tracks intended for the album ended up on other albums or singles.

The album cover includes a self-portrait of long time KMFDM artist Aidan Hughes, who appears as the man on the left side of the cover. The album's cover came about after Hughes experienced "artistic block" because he usually tried to base his artwork on the music as closely as possible; Konietzko allowed him more freedom to create cover art, so Hughes became inspired to create the cover for Money based on his own personal experience instead. Hughes related that the image represents "my disillusionment with the street lifestyle I was experiencing at the time, and the art carries with it the implication that no matter what temptation lies in your path, you still gotta pay!"

=== Apart tracks ===
Apart (the second version, which did not include Esch's solo songs) would have included:

A1 Vogue/Govern Your Soul 5:26 (version released as part of the Wax Trax! Industrial Accident documentary soundtrack)

A2 Split 4:20 (version released as "Split-Apart", which appeared on the Vogue single)

A3 Help Us/Save Us/Take Us Away 5:53 (same as the final released version on Money)

A4 Blood 5:10 (original version that was later released on the A Drug Against War single albeit a minute longer)

B1 Thank You 0:43 (later included on the rarities compilation Agogo)

B2 Spiritual House 5:01 (slightly different version than the final release)

B3 Bargeld 6:11 (version released as "Bargeld (Cashflow Mix)", which appeared on the Help Us/Save Us/Take Us Away single)

B4 Sex on the Flag 4:17 (same as the final released version on Money)

B5 We Must Awaken 4:53 (same as the final released version on Money)

This particular version of Apart was released by KMFDM's online store in early 2020 as a download, after it had been leaked onto the internet.

== Release ==
Money was released in February 1992. It spawned two club hits, the title track and "Vogue", both of which charted on the Billboard Dance/Club Play Songs Chart a few months later. KMFDM toured twice in support of the album: first on a mini-tour in June, and again on a full tour in October and November.

== Reception ==
Professional ratings
Review scores
Source	Rating
Allmusic	3/5 stars
Spin	negative
The Tech	positive

Money received mixed reviews. Alex Henderson of Allmusic called it "excellent" and stated that "a blistering metal guitar, distorted industrial vocals, and a syncopated dance beat could indeed be united into a cohesive, exciting whole". Rick Roos from The Tech said "The main problem with the album is its lack of new material". He noted that there were only seven new tracks, and that the rest were either remixes or remakes of songs from Naïve, KMFDM's previous album. However, he said that the new tracks were "for the most part aggressive, ferocious songs... with surprisingly strong musicianship". He called "Sex on the Flag" the album's best song, and its chorus "addictive". He also said that the album's first two tracks were "exceptional and entertaining". He concluded by calling the album "very strong and fierce but... actually quite easy to listen to".

Chuck Eddy of Spin magazine was less complimentary. He said KMFDM was "concentrating on atmosphere now, not songs". He went on to say that "there are some neat little touches", but that "the drone-y dinks barely coalesce into hooks". His final thought was that "novelty bands should learn to stick to novelty".

== Tour ==
KMFDM supported the release of Money with two tours in 1992: the three-week Aloha Jerry Brown tour in June and the two-month Sucks Money tour in October and November. At the band's Boston show on 23 October at Man Ray, the show had to be temporarily halted due to damage to the floor's support beams because of the crowd's synchronized jumping.

== Track listing ==
All information from 2006 album booklet.

No.	Title	Music	Length
1.	"Money"	Sascha Konietzko, En Esch, Günter Schulz	5:29
2.	"Vogue"	Konietzko, Esch, Schulz	4:05
3.	"Help Us/Save Us/Take Us Away"	Konietzko, Schulz	6:02
4.	"Bargeld"	Konietzko, Esch, Schulz	7:14
5.	"Spiritual House"	Konietzko, Schulz	5:21
6.	"Sex on the Flag (Jezebeelzebuttfunk Mix)"	Konietzko, Schulz	4:25
7.	"I Will Pray (*a reworking of "Godlike")"	Konietzko, Esch, Schulz	5:59
8.	"We Must Awaken"	Konietzko, Schulz	5:01
Total length:			43:36

CD bonus tracks
No.	Title	Music	Length
9.	"Under Satan (Dub)"	Konietzko, Schulz	4:11
10.	"Vogue (2000)"	Konietzko, Esch, Schulz	2:59
11.	"Money (Deutschmark Mix)"	Konietzko, Esch, Schulz	3:40
Total length:			54:26

== Personnel ==
- Sascha Konietzko – vocals, bass, synths, programming
- Günter Schulz – guitars

=== Additional personnel ===
- En Esch – vocals (2, 7, 10)
- Dorona Alberti – background vocals
- Christine Siewert – background vocals (2, 10)

=== Production ===
- Sascha Konietzko – production, mixing
- Blank Fontana – engineering
- Brian Gardner – remastering (2006 release)
- Aidan Hughes – artwork
- Chris Z – type (1992 release)
- Justin Gammon – layout (2006 release)
- Jacques Sehy – photography
