= Gentle Death =

Studio album by Excessive Force
- Released: 1993
- Genre: Industrial
- Length: 48:30
- Label: Wax Trax! Records, TVT Records
- Producer: Sascha Konietzko, Chris Shepard

Excessive Force chronology
Conquer Your World (1991)	Gentle Death (1993)

Gentle Death is a 1993 album by Excessive Force, a KMFDM side project. On November 6, 2007, this album was re-released with remastered audio as well as the "Blitzkrieg" single as bonus tracks.

== Track listing ==
No.	Title	Length
1.	"Violent Peace (Bitch Mix)"	4:44
2.	"Blitzkrieg (Sturzkampf)"	3:27
3.	"Divebomb"	6:04
4.	"Gentle Death"	5:02
5.	"Pigfaced"	5:12
6.	"Desperate State"	6:30
7.	"Queen Bitch"	3:53
8.	"Leather Clad Dub"	5:36
9.	"Blitzkrieg (Reprise)"	4:07
10.	"Stormraiser"	3:46
Total length:		48:30

2007 reissue bonus tracks
No.	Title	Length
11.	"Violent Peace"	5:47
12.	"Blitzkrieg"	6:18
13.	"Leather Clad Warrior"	6:20
Total length:		66:55

== Personnel ==
- Sascha Konietzko – vocals, programming, and drums
- Günter Schulz – guitar (2, 8, 9, 12, 13)
- Mark Durante – guitar (3–5)
- En Esch – guitar (6)
- Liz Torres – vocals (1, 6, 7, 11)
- George Booker – vocals (6)
- Evie Camp – vocals (3, 4)
- Meechie Faire – vocals (5)

== Reception ==
The Trouser Press Guide to '90s Rock wrote that it "plays like a half finished KMFDM album".
