= Cheryl Wilson =

American singer

Cheryl Wilson is a session singer who has had multiple No. 1 dance songs on the UK Billboard chart and has performed with many notable artists including Celine Dion, R. Kelly, Alice Peacock, Mavis Staples, The Smashing Pumpkins, Bertie Higgins, Michael Bolton, Bill Withers, Peabo Bryson, David Foster, Josh Grobin, Enrique Iglesias, Nick Carter, KMFDM, Cameo, Rod Stewart, Ray Charles, Natalie Cole, Mel Torme, Spike Lee, Tony Bennett, Peter Cetera, and Martha Wash. She has also sung in commercials for companies such as McDonald's and is a member of the Jazz & Contemporary Studies Faculty at Roosevelt University in Chicago. She contributes vocals to Jim Warner's Chicago musical project, Akalibrio. Her performance on the KMFDM song "Power" was described as "soul-mama vamping". She toured with Jim Gailloreto's Jazz String Quintent in 2016 to perform his modern jazz work, The Pythiad.

== Partial discography ==
- Xtort (KMFDM – 1996)
- Johnny Boy Would Love This (John Martyn tribute – 2011)
- The Pythiad (Jim Gailloreto's Jazz String Quintet – 2017)
