= Xtort =

Studio album by KMFDM
- Released: 25 June 1996
- Recorded: 1995–96
- Studios: CRC (Chicago); Hole in the Wall (Seattle)
- Genres: Industrial metal; industrial rock
- Length: 48:46
- Label: Wax Trax!
- Producers: Sascha Konietzko; Günter Schulz; Chris Shepard

KMFDM chronology
Nihil (1995)	Xtort (1996)	Symbols (1997)

Singles from Xtort
- 1. "Power" Released: August 15, 1996; 2. "Rules" Released: November 5, 1996

Xtort (stylized as XTOЯT) is the eighth studio album by German industrial band KMFDM, released on June 25, 1996, by Wax Trax! Records. It was recorded from the end of 1995 through early 1996, shortly after the death of Wax Trax! co-founder and band friend Jim Nash. Xtort features a variety of guest artists from the industrial music scene and studio musicians from other genres, but includes limited participation from core member En Esch.

The album was massively promoted by KMFDM's American label TVT Records, which pressed tens of thousands of copies of its lead single "Power". Frontman Sascha Konietzko created his own form of promotion, issuing a press release that both disparaged and lauded the coming set. Xtort was generally well-received by critics and is the band's highest-charting album to date. After the original release went out of print, a remastered version was released in 2007.

== Background ==
In late 1995, KMFDM had completed the "Beat by Beat" and "In Your Face" tours in support of their last album, Nihil. KMFDM frontman and founder Sascha Konietzko described Nihil as "the crown", and said the band had come as close to mainstream popularity as he wanted. He felt the band needed to move away from its success. In 2007, Konietzko recalled that he had "hated all the attention, interviews, photo shoots, etc.". After the tours, Konietzko returned to Chicago in order to be with his friend Jim Nash, co-founder of Wax Trax! Records, who was dying from AIDS. Konietzko referred to the death of Nash that October as "the end of an era".

En Esch, one of the longtime core members of KMFDM, had almost nothing to do with Xtort, contributing to just two songs. With regard to Esch's lack of participation, Konietzko said, "En Esch is just En Esch. He never made himself available to do this album, and so it's always my belief that the thing must keep moving; I had to do it without him." He also said the two were not in communication around the time of the album's release.

== Production ==
Xtort was pre-produced and tracked in Seattle at Hole in the Wall Studio, and recorded and mixed in Chicago at Chicago Recording Company. Konietzko contacted F. M. Einheit and had him come to Chicago in January 1996 to work on some tracks together. Konietzko also brought in a number of Wax Trax! alumni, such as Chris Connelly of Revolting Cocks and Bill Rieflin of Ministry, to help with the album's creation, along with assistance from more than a dozen studio musicians. Konietzko required all the album's contributors to be on call thirteen hours a day during production, saying "I don't care what they do on their own time, but when they do KMFDM, if they don't comply with the schedule, they're out."

Konietzko said the ideas for songs began with individual sounds, which he then modified until he created a looped rhythm. "Craze", for example, Konietzko called "an homage to Atari Teenage Riot, a band with two guys, one girl, a couple TR90S [sic] drum machines and a bass machine." He said he was inspired by touring with the band in Europe in support of Nihil in 1995. After creating the base tunes, the songs went to Günter Schulz, another longtime member, to add guitars. With the completed songs, Konietzko then allowed guest artists, such as Connelly, to pick songs they wanted to contribute to, and added their vocals or other instrumentation. For Xtort, Konietzko used Macintosh products to do all the synchronization.

"Blame"
The chorus of "Blame", which features some of the horn section from Tower of Power

"Power"
The chorus of "Power", which features "soul-mama vamping" by Cheryl Wilson

Connelly contributed to four tracks, including "Blame", which also featured the horn section from the Oakland, California, based group Tower of Power. Nicole Blackman, KMFDM's publicist at the time, contributed spoken word vocals to the track "Dogma", which was adapted from the ten-minute live performance she provided while touring with the band. "Power", meanwhile, was made to fulfill a request by the band's label, Wax Trax!, for a radio promo song. Konietzko said he'd heard "radio didn't like big female choruses", so he got voiceover commercial singer Cheryl Wilson to help with the song, which he called "dumb and catchy". The hidden track of the album, "Fairy", is a story narrated by Jr. Blackmail, who had worked with the band previously in the 1980s. Konietzko said it was inspired by Blackmail's "dirty fantasies". He also said it was not a serious track: "it was more like kids at play". For the background sounds, the group did things like roll screws on the floor while Schulz played piano.

== Release ==
The first track on the album, "Power", was featured on the "Wax Trax! Summer Swindle", a cassette sampler included with 45,000 issues of the July 1996 issue of Alternative Press. Another 50,000 copies of the sampler were to be handed out at summer college and beach events and given away at radio stations. 90,000 pre-release posters and information sheets were mailed out to fans.

The character Son of a Gun from the video of the same name.

Blackman wrote the promotional piece for the album's press kit, and at Konietzko's request, wrote the first half of the promo as an insulting take down of the album rather than as a standard promo. The first letter of each line of the first section of the promo spelled out the phrase "April Fools Day Fucker" and included lines such as "It's been 100 years and fifty albums for the German/American rock squad—are they running out of gas or what?" and "KMFDM can't suck hard enough", a quote from the track "Inane". The second half of the promo included phrases such as "XTORT is a supersonic soundtrack" and "The new album is the sound of a band at the height of their powers." Carrie Borzillo of Billboard stated KMFDM was "poised to make a significant commercial breakthrough." Konietzko said at the time there were no plans to tour in support of the album's release. He later said this was due to the fact that the band as a touring unit had ceased to exist.

Xtort was released on June 25, 1996 on Wax Trax!/TVT on cassette, CD, and vinyl. The album was also released in CD format in Europe and Japan. In addition to being the first KMFDM album to chart in the Billboard 200, staying there for three weeks and peaking at No. 92 the week of July 13, 1996, Xtort sold over 200,000 copies, making it one of the band's best-selling albums. The song "Son of a Gun" was made into an animated video by visual artist Aidan "Brute!" Hughes, who also did the album's cover artwork. On March 6, 2007, Metropolis Records released a digitally remastered version of the album on CD and MP3. Looking back on the album at the time of its re-release, Konietzko said it was his favorite album of the 1990s.

== Critical reception ==
Professional ratings
Review scores
Source	Rating
AllMusic	3/5 stars
Chicago Sun-Times	4/4 stars
CMJ New Music Monthly	favorable
Daily Herald	3/4 stars
Entertainment Weekly	A−
Rolling Stone	favorable

Reviews for Xtort were almost universally positive. Jon Wiederhorn of Entertainment Weekly called it "the heaviest and most danceable disc in [KMFDM's] 12-year career" while giving it an A−. Heidi MacDonald of CMJ New Music Monthly compared Xtort to getting hit with a wrecking ball, saying, "When KMFDM does what it does best, it is the best at what it does, namely jack-hammer industrial anthems that hit with stunning precision and power." Sandy Masuo of Rolling Stone called the album "the product of a first-rate lineup," and praised the album's diversity, saying, "The 10 tracks on Xtort are grounded in KMFDM's smart synthesis of metallic crunch, swiveling rhythms and sophisticated electronics, but it's the organic elements that give the album a zesty twist." Kevin M. Williams of the Chicago Sun-Times gave the album an "essential" rating, and said, "KMFDM has some major mojo working with Xtort". Stephen Thomas Erlewine of AllMusic was less enthusiastic, saying, "it would be nice to hear [KMFDM] branch out and start to experiment a little bit more", and commenting that while Xtort did not sound much different from previous releases, "KMFDM sounds as good as they ever have, and several tracks rank among their best." Liz Armstrong of the Daily Herald thought the guest contributors added significant differences to their individual songs.

Larry Flick of Billboard said "Power", the opening track, "finds front man Sascha Konietzko snarling and growling with palpable force, while Cheryl Wilson softens the edges with splashes of soul-mama vamping during the chorus." Williams called the song "irresistible". Masuo noted in particular the use of horns and the Hammond B3 organ, and concluded by stating, "In their insidiously arty and intellectually sassy music, KMFDM continue to bring diverse elements together to create a unified whole." Armstrong called "Dogma" a song that crossed over from being industrial to "frightening", while MacDonald described it as "blistering" and Williams said it was "captivating". Armstrong said "Son of a Gun" was the album's "truly explosive track", but Williams thought "Inane" was the best song.

== Track listing ==
All information from 2007 release CD booklet.

No.	Title	Writer(s)	Length
1.	"Power"	Sascha Konietzko, Günter Schulz	5:26
2.	"Apathy"	Mark Durante, Konietzko, Schulz	3:11
3.	"Rules"	Chris Connelly, Durante, Konietzko, Schulz	4:07
4.	"Craze"	Connelly, Konietzko, Schulz	3:34
5.	"Dogma"	Nicole Blackman, F. M. Einheit, Konietzko, Schulz	4:06
6.	"Inane"	Durante, Konietzko, Schulz	5:30
7.	"Blame"	Connelly, Konietzko, Schulz	4:06
8.	"Son of a Gun"	Konietzko, Schulz, Jon Van Eaton	4:23
9.	"Ikons"	Connelly, Einheit, Konietzko, Schulz	4:12
10.	"Wrath"	Konietzko, Schulz, Van Eaton	5:29
11.	"Fairy" (originally a hidden track at the end of "Wrath" on Wax Trax!/TVT release)	Jr Blackmail, Konietzko, Schulz	4:27
Total length:			48:31

== Personnel ==
All information from 2007 release CD booklet except where noted.

=== Band members ===
- Mark Durante – guitar (2, 3, 6)
- Sascha Konietzko – vocals, bass (1–6, 8–10), synthesizers, programming, drums (1–3, 10), production, mixing
- Bill Rieflin – drums (5–10)
- Günter Schulz – bass (7), guitar, piano (11), mixing, photography
- En Esch – voice (1), guitar solo (6)
- Jennifer Ginsberg – background vocals (7)

=== Additional personnel ===
- Dorona Alberti – vocals (4, 8, 9)
- Bruce Bendinger – voice (6)
- Bruce Breckenfeld – Hammond B3 organ (3)
- Jr Blackmail – narration (11)
- Nicole Blackman – vocals (5), spoken word (10)
- Michael Cichowicz – trumpet (7)
- Chris Connelly – vocals (3, 4, 7, 9)
- F. M. Einheit – whipping, banging, and breaking stuff (5), lawnchairs, rubble, rocks and dirt (9)
- Steve Finkel – saxophone (7)
- Jack Kramer – trumpet (7)
- Ron Lowe – drill and vacuum cleaner (8)
- Bob Samborski – trombone (7)
- Jon Van Eaton – noise (10)
- Cheryl Wilson – vocals (1, 3, 6)

=== Production ===
- Chris Shepard – production, engineering, mixing
- Jon Van Eaton – assistant production
- Rob Lowe – assistant engineering
- Claudine Pontier – assistant engineering
- Konrad Strauss – mastering
- Brian Gardner – remastering
- Paul Elledge – photography
- Justin Gammon – photography
- Brute! – cover art
