= Power (KMFDM song) =

- Limited edition 12" (1027 of 3000)

Single by KMFDM

from the album Xtort
- Released: August 15, 1996
- Recorded: Late 1995–early 1996 (in Chicago, Illinois)
- Genre: Industrial metal
- Length: 5:26
- Label: Wax Trax!/TVT, Metropolis, KMFDM
- Songwriters: Sascha Konietzko, Günter Schulz
- Producers: Sascha Konietzko, Günter Schulz, Chris Shepard

KMFDM singles chronology
| "Trust" (1995) | "Power" (1996) | "Rules" (1996) |

Audio sample
- "Power": file; help

"Power" is the first track on the KMFDM album Xtort. It was used to promote the album before its release in the summer of 1996. It was released in two limited edition vinyl pressings and as a CD single.

== Background ==
KMFDM was preparing to release their ninth studio album Xtort. TVT Records was heavily promoting its release, and used "Power" as the single to help spread awareness of the upcoming album. "Power" was featured on the "Wax Trax! Summer Swindle", a cassette sampler included with 45,000 issues of the July 1996 issue of Alternative Press. Another 50,000 copies of the sampler were handed out at summer college and beach events and given away to radio stations.

== Release ==
"Power" was released as a 12" vinyl pressing of 3000 individually numbered copies on August 15, 1996. The A-side contained the track, while the B-side had an etched KMFDM logo. A CD single was also released containing an edited version of the track.

On August 1, 2009, the single was released as a 7" vinyl pressing of 250 copies. This release included the track "Dogma" as a B-side.
