= A Drug Against War =

Single by KMFDM

from the album Angst
- B-side: "Blood"
- Released: 23 September 1993
- Recorded: Chicago Recording Company
- Genre: Speed metal
- Length: 3:49
- Label: Wax Trax!/TVT
- Songwriters: Mark Durante, Sascha Konietzko, Klaus Schandelmaier, Günter Schulz, Chris Shepard
- Producer: KMFDM

KMFDM singles chronology
"Sucks" (1993)	"A Drug Against War" (1993)	"Light" (1994)

Audio sample
- file; help

Professional ratings
Review scores
Source	Rating
Allmusic	4/5 stars

"A Drug Against War" is a song by industrial rock band KMFDM, taken from their 1993 album Angst. It was released as a single prior to the album. A music video was made for the single, featuring repetitive scenes in a comic book format, including animated depictions of the band's previous album covers and singles, and was subsequently shown on the MTV cartoon Beavis and Butt-head on 11 July 1994. It was re-released as a 7" in 2009. On 16 December 2010 it was made available as a downloadable song for the game Rock Band. In late 2011, the band released a new version of the song called "A Drug Against Wall Street", with lyrics in support of the Occupy Wall Street movement, and made it available for free download from their site.

== Song ==
The song includes several militaristic samples. The primary one, in which someone calls for the bombing of enemy troops, comes from a live news broadcast about the Gulf War that Konietzko taped.

The lyrics mix social criticism with regular reference to war, and the instruments simulate the sounds of missiles and gunfire. Eventually, the martial symbolism becomes so overt and over-the-top that academic S. Alexander Reed identifies this as a sign that it is meant satirically. Reed compares these militaristic themes to the "war on drugs", which is ironically referenced in the song's title and turned into an anti-war motto. According to Reed, the song's ironic use of militarism marks it as yet another social ill to be criticized.

== Music video ==
An animated music video was made for "A Drug Against War" directed by Aidan Hughes, an English artist who frequently collaborated with the band on their artwork and videos.

The visual style (in an animated comic book format, with KMFDM's cover albums and singles) is dark, satirical, and with a detailed cyberpunk/industrial imagery. The video itself features dystopian themes and intricate animation that matches the song's aggressive industrial sound.

== Critical reception ==
Andy Hinds, in the 2002 book All Music Guide to Rock, called the song KMFDM's most over the top moment to date. Ten years after its release, Brad Filicky of CMJ New Music Report said "A Drug Against War" was one of the most potent speed metal songs ever. Joshua Landau of Allmusic said that while the song was "one of the best introductions to KMFDM's antagonistic guitars and viewpoints", the four track single was "only of interest to serious fans".

"A Drug Against War" was ranked No. 47 on COMA Music Magazine's 101 Greatest Industrial Songs of All Time.

== Track listing ==
=== 1993 release ===
No.	Title	Length
1.	"A Drug Against War"	3:40
2.	"A Drug Against War (Overdose-Mix)"	5:25
3.	"A Drug Against War (Hookah-Mix)"	3:33
4.	"Blood"	4:00
Total length:		16:38

=== 2009 7" reissue ===
No.	Title	Length
1.	"A Drug Against War (Single Mix)"	3:40
2.	"Blood (Single Mix)"	3:58
Total length:		7:38

== Personnel ==
- Sascha Konietzko – vocals (1–4), programming (1–4), drum sequences and arrangement (3, 4), production
- En Esch – drum sequences and arrangement (1, 2)
- Mark Durante – guitars (1–3)
- Svet Am – guitars (1–4)
- Christine Siewert – backing vocals (4)
