= Brute (song) =

Single by KMFDM
- B-side: "Revolution"
- Released: 31 October 1995
- Genre: Industrial metal
- Length: 21:57
- Label: Wax Trax!/TVT
- Songwriters: Sascha Konietzko, Klaus Schandelmaier, Günter Schulz, Raymond Watts

KMFDM singles chronology
"Juke Joint Jezebel" (1995)	"Brute" (1995)	"Trust" (1995)

"Brute" is a song by industrial rock group KMFDM that was first released on their 1995 album Nihil. It was also released as a single with the song "Revolution" as the B-side.

Band member Raymond Watts (aka Pig) was on vocals.

== Track listing ==
=== 1995 release ===
No.	Title	Mix By	Length
1.	"Brute (Nihil Original Album-Mix)"	KMFDM	4:25
2.	"Brute (Kun$t)"	Sonofagun	4:15
3.	"Brute (In Your Face)"	KMFDM	3:34
4.	"Brute (Punch)"	Sonofagun	4:16
5.	"Revolution II"	KMFDM	5:27
Total length:			21:57

- The 12" release contains the same tracks but in a different order.

=== 2009 7" reissue ===
No.	Title	Length
1.	"Brute"	3:58
2.	"Revolution II"	5:24
Total length:		9:22

- Track 1 is a shorter mix of the Original Album-Mix which does not contain the noise heard at the end of the song. This noise served as a transition to the next song, "Trust".

=== 2014 12" release ===
No.	Title	Mix By	Length
1.	"Brute (Kun$t)"	Sonofagun	4:15
2.	"Brute (In Your Face)"	KMFDM	3:34
3.	"Brute (Punch)"	Sonofagun	4:16
4.	"Revolution II"	KMFDM	5:27
Total length:			17:32
