= Marlies Dekkers =

Dutch fashion designer

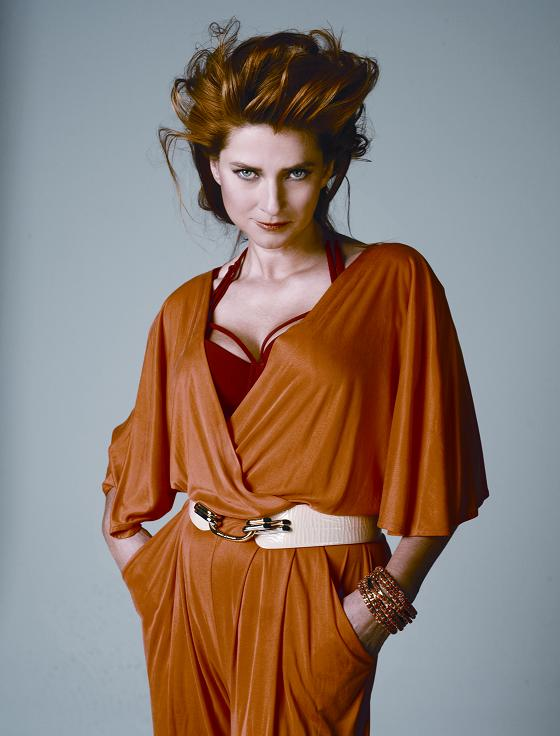
- Dekkers in 2012
- Born: 29 November 1965 (age 60); Oosterhout, Netherlands
- Occupation: Fashion designer
- Label: marlies|dekkers
- Spouse: Peter Wagenaar (div. 2006)

Marlies Dekkers (Dutch pronunciation: [mɑrˈliz ˈdɛkərs]; born 29 November 1965) is a Dutch fashion designer known for her lingerie line Undressed.

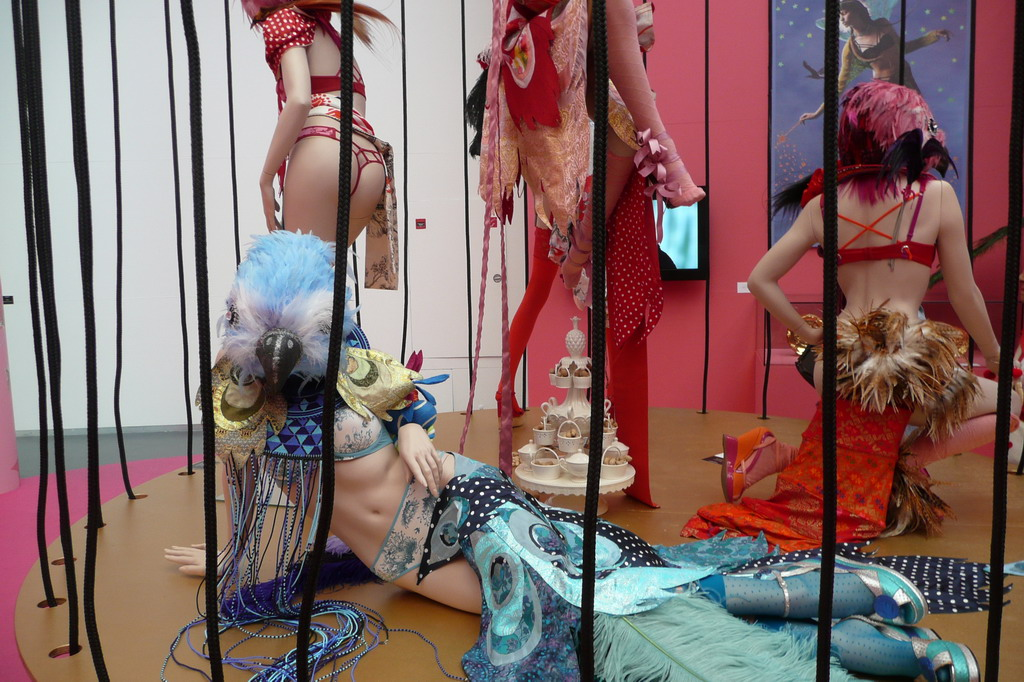
Designs by Marlies Dekkers

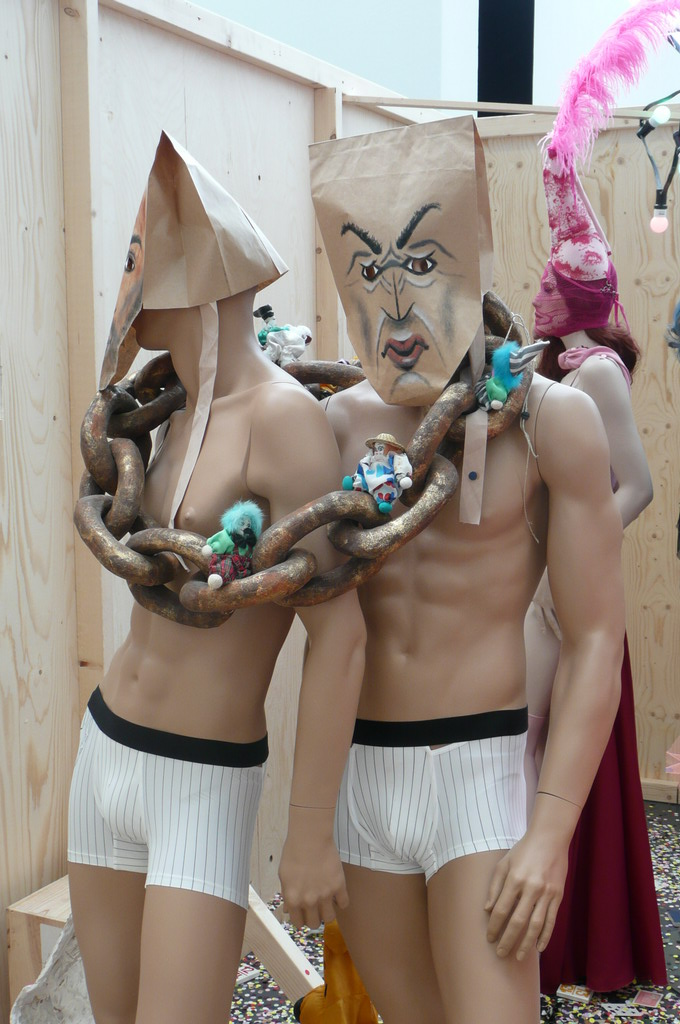
Designs from a retrospective exhibit, "15 Years of Marlies Dekkers", in Rotterdam

== Biography ==
She studied at the Art school in Breda, graduating cum laude (with distinction) in 1991. With the aid of a government grant, she launched, two years later in 1993, her first collection of items under the fashion label Undressed, heralded at the time as a new approach to designing lingerie.

In 1996, Dekkers married Peter Wagenaar, a photographer. The couple have a daughter Zilver (Silver in Dutch). Wagenaar was also a member of the board of Marlies Dekkers' company. When the couple divorced in 2006, Wagenaar also left the company.

== Points of sale ==
The Marlies Dekkers brand (stylized in print as "marlies|dekkers") is sold in 1,000 Marlies Dekkers stores worldwide in cities such as Amsterdam, Rotterdam, Antwerp, Paris, Bangkok, Berlin, Moscow and Cologne. A store was briefly opened in New York from December 2008 to March 2009 and in Utrecht at the end of 2008. The products are also sold online.

There are 4 additional locations that carry marlies|dekkers. The newest of these locations, Uplift Intimate Apparel, opened in 2017 in Carmel, Indiana, and carries a wide variety of her styles. In Salt Lake City, Utah, the BraBar|boutique, which opened in 2012, carries Undressed and marlies|dekkers. Estilo established marlies|dekkers sales in 2009, and the Australasian relater Myer carries this brand.

== Fashion lines ==
- Undressed Women (lingerie collection for women)
- Undressed Special Sizes (lingerie collection for curvy women)
- Undressed Girls (lingerie collection for young women)
- Undressed Men (modern underwear line for men)
- Undressed Cotton (never out of stock cotton line for both men and women)
- Undressed Secrets (vintage lingerie collection)
- Sundressed (beachwear & accessories)
- Sundressed Sunglasses (sunglasses)
- Nightdressed (luxurious lounge- and evening wear)

== Awards ==
- Dutch Bodyfashion Award (1994)
- ELLE's Innovator of the Year Award (2004)
- Grand Seigneur (2005)
- Prix Veuve Clicquot Business woman of the year (2007)
- Cila Award – Best Fashion Lingerie (2007)
- Creator of the Year (2008)
- CILA Award – Best Maternity Lingerie (2008)
- Marie Claire Prix de la Mode (2008)

== Public Collections ==
- Rijksmuseum Amsterdam
