= Boots (EP) =

EP by KMFDM
- Released: 5 February 2002
- Recorded: March 2001
- Genre: Industrial rock
- Length: 17:20
- Label: Metropolis
- Producer: KMFDM

KMFDM chronology
Megalomaniac (1998)	Boots (2002)	Day of Light (2010)

Professional ratings
Review scores
Source	Rating
AllMusic	3/5 stars

"Boots" is a single by KMFDM, featuring a cover of the Nancy Sinatra song "These Boots Are Made for Walkin'". It was the first release by the band after their three-year hiatus.

== Track listing ==
All tracks are written by Lee Hazlewood, unless otherwise noted

No.	Title	Length
1.	"These Boots Are Made for Walkin'"	2:50
2.	"These Boots Are Made for Walkin' (Bombs Mix)"	3:44
3.	"These Boots Are Made for Walkin' (Candy Mix)"	6:22
4.	"Back in the U.S.S.A." (Sascha Konietzko)	4:24
Total length:		17:20

== Personnel ==
- Dorona Alberti – vocals (1–3)
- Lucia Cifarelli – vocals (4)
- Jules Hodgson – guitars (4)
- Sascha Konietzko – vocals, programming, guitars (1, 4), bass (4), drums (4)
- Bill Rieflin – synthesizer, programming (4)
- Tim Skold – programming, bass (1), guitars (1), drums (1)

=== Production ===
- Producer – Sascha Konietzko
- Engineer – Chris Shepard
