= Nihil (KMFDM album) =

Studio album by KMFDM
- Released: April 4, 1995
- Recorded: 1994
- Studios: Bad Animals, Seattle, Washington
- Genres: Industrial rock; industrial metal; industrial dance
- Length: 49:03
- Label: Wax Trax!
- Producers: Sascha Konietzko; Chris Shepard

KMFDM chronology
Angst (1993)	Nihil (1995)	Xtort (1996)

Singles from Nihil
- 1. "Juke Joint Jezebel" Released: 28 February 1995; 2. "Juke Joint Jezebel" Released: 30 May 1995; 3. "Brute" Released: 31 October 1995; 4. "Trust/Juke Joint Jezebel" Released: 31 October 1995

Nihil is the seventh studio album by German industrial band KMFDM, released on April 4, 1995, by Wax Trax! Records. The album marked the return of former band member Raymond Watts and the first appearance of session drummer Bill Rieflin, and was mostly written by frontman Sascha Konietzko.

The album's first single "Juke Joint Jezebel" is the band's most widely known song, with millions of copies sold over various releases. Widely praised by critics, Nihil is the band's best-selling album. After the original release went out of print, a remastered version was released in 2007.

== Background ==
In late 1993, Sascha Konietzko and fellow multi-instrumentalist En Esch both left Chicago, moving to Seattle and New Orleans, respectively. Lead guitarist Günter Schulz left the country, moving to Kelowna, British Columbia. In early 1994, Konietzko started working on new material, and Schulz came to Seattle to begin adding guitars to the tracks. Later that year, the group assembled in Los Angeles to rehearse for the upcoming Angstfest tour in support of Angst, which spanned April and May. Konietzko, Schulz, Esch, and guitarist Mark Durante were joined by another guitarist, Mike Jensen, for a live show that featured up to four guitarists playing at once. Konietzko and Schulz, along with Dutch singer Dorona Alberti, returned to Seattle to begin recording vocals for Nihil. Konietzko later said he was not happy with the sessions, explaining that nothing was coming together, and only two songs from the upcoming album, "Trust" and "Brute", had been completed to his satisfaction.

Former KMFDM member Raymond Watts, last seen contributing vocals, programming, and production to 1988's Don't Blow Your Top before starting his own band, Pig, called Konietzko and asked if he would be interested in working on a small musical collaboration. Konietzko agreed, and Watts flew to Seattle, where the pair, along with Schulz, worked on an EP entitled Sin Sex & Salvation. Konietzko said of the trio's working together, "It was the breath of fresh air I had been hoping and waiting for. This short project took my mind off the problems with the KMFDM album and gave me a welcome change of perspective." Watts then stayed on with the group to begin work on Nihil, which featured a core group of Konietzko, Schulz, Watts, and Esch, along with some input from steel guitar specialist Durante and drummer Bill Rieflin.

== Production ==
Discussing the change in songwriting from Angst, Konietzko said: "I wasn't comfortable with the band scenario on that album, where everybody had input. It allowed for too many compromises. Angst seems not organic to me." In another interview, he explained: "Contrary to the past, I wrote all the songs for Nihil," adding that doing things that way caused "minimal problems".

Konietzko stated that the band overused guitars on their previous album, Angst, saying it sounded "like guitarists jacking off". On Nihil, the guitars were mixed in last. Durante had recently purchased a triple-neck Fender steel guitar in Houston, and used it during recording sessions, but added a significant amount of distortion to it, making it sound like a "regular" guitar but giving it what he called a "sliding" sound. Konietzko also brought in a trio of horn players to perform on "Disobedience", saying he had always wanted a horn section in a KMFDM song, but that he had never been able to afford it before.

Konietzko originally wrote thirty songs over a period of eight or nine months for Nihil before settling on ten final tracks. Watts came into the studio after the songs were mostly complete and added lyrics to a handful of songs, which he said was "actually quite liberating" in contrast to writing his own music from scratch. Konietzko described the album as being entirely foreplay, without any resolution, and said it was the band's best album to date, a statement he believed he would be standing by for years. He also said its poppier sound was more his style. Konietzko produced the album with sound engineer Chris Shepard, who had also engineered the band's previous album.

== Release ==
"Juke Joint Jezebel"
The "swooping, gospelish chorus" from "Juke Joint Jezebel", KMFDM's biggest hit

Nihil was originally released on April 4, 1995. A digitally remastered re-release of Nihil was released on March 6, 2007, along with a similar re-release of KMFDM's 1996 album Xtort. The band toured twice in 1995 in support of the album, first doing the Beat by Beat tour shortly after the album's release, and then the In Your Face tour later in the year. The album, which had "major buzz", had an initial shipment of 75,000 copies.

The album's first track, "Ultra", was featured in the U.S. release of Street Fighter II: The Animated Movie, and was the theme song for Manga Entertainment's anime catalog trailer. "Juke Joint Jezebel", the band's biggest hit, was featured in the film Bad Boys and in an episode of Beverly Hills 90210. "Juke Joint Jezebel (Metropolis Mix)" was featured in the film Mortal Kombat. The video for "Juke Joint Jezebel" includes footage from the Patlabor 1 anime. More than two million copies of the song sold in 1995 alone.

Nihil was Wax Trax!'s best-selling album to date by the end of 1995, and went on to sell over 120,000 copies by August 1996. Nihil reached No. 16 on the Billboard Heatseekers chart, and was later labelled one of Wax Trax!'s commercial high points. By 2016, the album had sold a total of 209,000 copies, making it the band's top-selling album of all time, according to Nielsen SoundScan.

Nihil is one of only two KMFDM studio albums (Opium being the other) that does not feature cover artwork by pop-artist Brute!, as according to him he was in the process of emigrating and was unable to make art for the album. Instead, the cover was designed by Rieflin's wife Francesca Sundsten. The band would return to using Brute!'s work on the next album, Xtort.

== Critical reception ==
Professional ratings
Review scores
Source	Rating
AllMusic	4/5 stars
Chicago Tribune	favorable
CMJ New Music Monthly	favorable
Guitar Player	favorable
Keyboard	favorable
Washington Post	favorable

Nihil received very favorable reviews from music critics. Heidi MacDonald of CMJ New Music Monthly called Nihil "a superb album that takes no prisoners from beginning to end," saying that the first three tracks are "nearly flawless" and calling "Disobedience" a "real standout." Andy Hinds of AllMusic also praised the album, calling "Juke-Joint Jezebel" "an enduring and indispensable dancefloor favorite at goth/industrial clubs around the world." He further said that the production on Nihil was "state of the art" and that KMFDM's sound was "quite polished and tight." Mark Jenkins of The Washington Post said the album "manages to stay fresh through the use of assorted sonic spices," adding that the album has "some canny accents."

Keyboard praised the album, describing "milky organ pads" on "Disobedience" and "snarling guitars [wrapped] in spiky synth barbed wire" on "Juke Joint Jezebel", and saying of band leader Konietzko, "You won't find a more imaginative or effective keyboardist on the hard-core scene." Chris Gill of Guitar Player, conversely, said "the most interesting parts are Durante's steel guitar lines, which howl like revving engines". Greg Kot of the Chicago Tribune said that "Juke Joint Jezebel" "swaggers like a Bourbon Street hooker, with crunching guitars and a swooping, gospelish chorus" at the time of the album's release, and in 2011, said the album put "a polished pop spin on industrial's characteristic harshness". Gill had similar praise, saying "few have succeeded in making the combination [of techno rhythms and thrash guitars] sound as natural as this".

== Track listing ==
No.	Title	Writer(s)	Length
1.	"Ultra"	Mark Durante, En Esch, Sascha Konietzko, Günter Schulz, Chris Shepard, Raymond Watts	4:34
2.	"Juke Joint Jezebel"	Esch, Konietzko, Schulz, Watts	5:40
3.	"Flesh"	Esch, Konietzko, Schulz, Watts	5:02
4.	"Beast"	Konietzko, Schulz	5:06
5.	"Terror"	Durante, Esch, Konietzko, Schulz, Shepard, Watts	4:50
6.	"Search & Destroy"	Esch, Konietzko, Schulz	3:26
7.	"Disobedience"	Durante, Esch, Konietzko, Schulz, Shepard, Watts	4:43
8.	"Revolution"	Esch, Konietzko, Schulz	4:27
9.	"Brute"	Esch, Konietzko, Schulz, Watts	4:25
10.	"Trust"	Konietzko, Schulz	3:43
11.	"Nihil" (hidden at the end of "Trust" on the Wax Trax!/TVT release)	Konietzko	2:04
Total length:			48:00

== Personnel ==
All information from 1995 release booklet except where noted.

=== Musicians ===
- Sascha Konietzko – synthesizers, vocals (1–7, 9–10), bass (6), drums (10), programming
- En Esch – vocals (1–3, 5–8), guitars (1, 3, 6), drums (6, 9), percussion (2, 3), harmonica (5)
- Günter Schulz – guitars, vocals (2, 6), bass (5), pre-production
- Mark Durante – guitars (1, 5, 7, 9)
- Raymond Watts – vocals (1–3, 5, 7, 9), bass (5), drum programming (5)

==== Additional personnel ====
- Dorona Alberti – vocals (4, 8, 10)
- Jim Christiansen – trombone (7)
- Jennifer Ginsberg – vocals (2)
- Jeff Olson – trumpet (7)
- Bill Rieflin – drums (1, 3, 7)
- Fritz Whitney – bari sax (7)

=== Production ===
- Sascha Konietzko – engineering, mixing, production
- Chris Shepard – engineering, production, mixing
- Sam Hofstedt – assistant engineering
- David Collins – mastering
- Francesca Sundsten – cover art
- Chris Z – type (1995 release)
- Justin Gammon – layout (2007 release)
