= Excessive Force =

Industrial music project

- Genres: Industrial
- Years active: 1991–1993
- Spinoff of: KMFDM, My Life with the Thrill Kill Kult

Excessive Force is a musical side project started in 1991 by Sascha Konietzko of KMFDM and Buzz McCoy of My Life with the Thrill Kill Kult.

== History ==
In 1991, Excessive Force released the single "Conquer Your House", followed by the album Conquer Your World. After this release, McCoy had no more involvement in Excessive Force, which went on to become exclusively a KMFDM side project. In 1993, Excessive Force released the single "Blitzkrieg" followed by the album Gentle Death. The band is also credited with remixes of the KMFDM songs "Light" and "Megalomaniac".

Konietzko dismissed the possibility of reforming Excessive Force referring to it as "a one off that turned into a two off." He also noted that there is a Canadian white supremacist band that uses the same name. On November 6, 2007, KMFDM Records re-released the entire Excessive Force back catalog.
