= Angst (KMFDM album) =

Studio album by KMFDM
- Released: 12 October 1993
- Recorded: 1993
- Studio: CRC, Chicago
- Genre: Industrial metal; industrial rock
- Length: 48:42
- Label: Wax Trax!
- Producer: KMFDM

KMFDM chronology
Money (1992)	Angst (1993)	Nihil (1995)

Singles from Angst
- 1. "Sucks" Released: October 1992; 2. "A Drug Against War" Released: 14 September 1993; 3. "Light" Released: 15 February 1994; 4. "Glory" Released: 31 October 1994

Angst is the sixth studio album by German industrial band KMFDM, released on 12 October 1993 by Wax Trax! Records.

== Background ==
Bandmates Sascha Konietzko and En Esch began working together again after splitting up during the recording of their previous album, Money. Konietzko had moved to Seattle in 1993, while Esch had moved to New Orleans, Louisiana. Angst was the first album the band recorded in America with new engineer Chris Shepard, after recording their first six albums in Hamburg, the previous four of which had all been engineered by Blank Fontana. Angst also marked the first appearance of steel guitarist Mark Durante, whose presence made a noticeable impact on the band's sound, moving it towards a more guitar-driven style. Dutch vocalist Dorona Alberti made her mark on the album as well, singing on half the songs, including lead vocals on "The Problem". The song "A Hole in the Wall" lyrically is a direct to-English translation of the German lyrics to the song "Liebeslied" from the recently pulled version of their 1990 offering 'Naïve (album)'.

== Production ==
After very limited participation on Money, Esch had a much stronger hand in the songwriting and recording of Angst, and commented after its release, "We've tried to involve guitar players, we tried to be like a real band, especially in the creative kind of aspect."

== Release ==
Angst was released on 13 October 1993. Unlike previous albums, Angst had a more rock-oriented sound, so the marketing strategy of Wax Trax!/TVT changed. TVT director of sales and marketing Paul Burgess said, "We decided to work them not like a typical dance-rock artist, but like a serious rock band, and it has crossed over to metal and commercial alternative this time." KMFDM embarked on the Angstfest Tour in support of the album in April and May 1994. In addition to the studio lineup, guitarist Mike Jensen was brought along for the live shows to duplicate the heavy sound of the album. This led to stage performances that included up to four guitarists playing at once.

The album had sold 20,000 copies by February 1994, and went on to sell more than 100,000 copies by October 1995. A digitally remastered reissue of Angst was released by Metropolis Records on 21 November 2006.

== Reception ==
Professional ratings
Review scores
Source	Rating
AllMusic	4/5 stars
CMJ New Music Report	positive
The Trouser Press Guide to '90s Rock	positive
The Virgin Encyclopedia of Nineties Music	positive
Tom Hull – on the Web	A−

Andy Hinds of AllMusic said KMFDM had reached their full potential on the album. He called "A Drug Against War" "the band's most over-the-top moment to date" and thought "Sucks" was funny and irreverent. He concluded by calling Angst a great album for KMFDM newcomers. Ira Robbins called Angst "the fulfillment of Money's promise, a meld of pop choruses, metal guitar riffs and industrial machine-beats". Colin Larkin said Angst "perfected the band's aggressive fusion of pounding electro rhythms and screeching guitars." Angst was given a Silver Salute by CMJ New Music Report in 2003, with Brad Filicky saying, "KMFDM managed to make people laugh, even as they were checking under their beds for monsters and finding the inspiration to plug their guitars into a MIDI unit."

== Track listing ==
All tracks are written by Sascha Konietzko, En Esch, Svet Am, Mark Durante, and Chris Shepard, except where noted.

No.	Title	Length
1.	"Light"	6:05
2.	"A Drug Against War"	3:43
3.	"Blood (Evil Mix)"	5:12
4.	"Lust"	4:22
5.	"Glory" (Konietzko, Am, Shepard)	3:54
6.	"Move On"	5:33
7.	"No Peace"	4:28
8.	"A Hole in the Wall"	5:50
9.	"Sucks" (Konietzko, Am)	3:32
10.	"The Problem" (Konietzko, Esch, Am, Shepard, R'delle Anderson)	6:03
Total length:		48:42

== Personnel ==
=== Musicians ===
- Sascha Konietzko – vocals, bass, keyboards, programming
- En Esch – vocals, guitars
- Günter Schulz (as Svet Am) – guitars, piano ("The Problem")
- Mark Durante – guitars

=== Additional personnel ===
- Dorona Alberti – vocals ("Light", "Lust", "Move On", "No Peace", "The Problem")
- Christine Siewert – vocals ("Blood (Evil Mix)")
- Bruce Breckenfeld – Hammond B3 organ ("No Peace")

=== Production ===
- Sascha Konietzko – production, arrangements
- Chris Shepard – recording, engineering, mixing
- Brian Gardner – digital editing
- Konrad Strauss – mastering
