= Mark Durante =

American musician and songwriter

- Born: 1950 or 1951 (age 74–75); Milwaukee, Wisconsin
- Origin: Chicago, Illinois
- Genres: Punk rock, heavy metal, country
- Occupations: Musician, songwriter
- Instrument: Guitar

Mark Durante is an American musician and songwriter who is based in Chicago.

== Career ==
Durante began playing guitar in 1966 after being inspired by the fretwork of Jimi Hendrix, Frank Zappa and Merle Travis. Ten years later, Durante founded a rock combo he named "Public Enemy". Durante's band bears no relationship to the hip-hop musicians of the same name. The band broke up when Durante expressed a desire to play punk rock.

In the early 1980s, Durante played guitar with The Aliens and the punk band The Next Big Thing. In the late 1980s, he played with the Slammin' Watusis who recorded two albums for Epic Records. It was during this time Mark started using the "durantula" moniker given to him by Blue Watusis drummer Marcus David, later to be trademarked. Although a third album by the Watusis was produced by Rick Nielsen of Cheap Trick, it was not released when Sony bought the label and dropped the band.

Durante then played guitar with Revolting Cocks on their 1990 U.S. tour and their 1991 European tour. During that tour, RevCo recorded the live tracks for their Beers, Steers and Queers Remixes EP, on which Durante provided guitar.

In 1992, Durante joined another Wax Trax industrial rock combo, KMFDM. In addition to playing guitar, Durante helped write all but two of the tracks on the album, Angst. Durante toured with KMFDM and provided guitar and some songwriting on the subsequent albums Nihil and Xtort. Allmusic describes the albums as KMFDM's "best-known and strongest releases". He also contributed to the KMFDM side project Excessive Force, appearing on the 1993 album Gentle Death.

From 1994 to 2008 Durante played steel guitar as a member of the insurgent country band The Waco Brothers. Originally intended to be a side project, Durante and the Waco Brothers have recorded eight albums for Chicago's Bloodshot Records label. Their last album, Waco Express: Live & Kickin' at Schuba's Tavern, is a concert recording which Ken Tucker, the pop music critic for NPR's Fresh Air and editor-at-large at Entertainment Weekly, described as "country as it should be written and played, with a long memory for roadhouse honky-tonks rather than TV-ready music videos." In 1997, Durante played guitar on Jon Langford's Skull Orchard album.

In 2002, Durante released a solo CD entitled Welcome to Earth under the nom de rock of durantula. 2010 saw the release of an EP "the Moai Men-Pearls Before Swine" durantula's instrumental project.

In addition to his work as a musician, Durante has also worked for major guitar companies including Hamer, Washburn and Parker and notably designed the Washburn WI-64, the original IDOL model in 1998. Idol guitars made in Mundelein Illinois became one of the companies popular models during the 2000s. He worked on numerous famous instruments such as Rick Neilsen's checkerboard Hamer five neck guitar. The number of instruments worked on during his tenure at these companies along with repairing instruments for over forty years, is well into the tens of thousands.
