= Dorona Alberti =

Dutch singer and actress (born 1975)

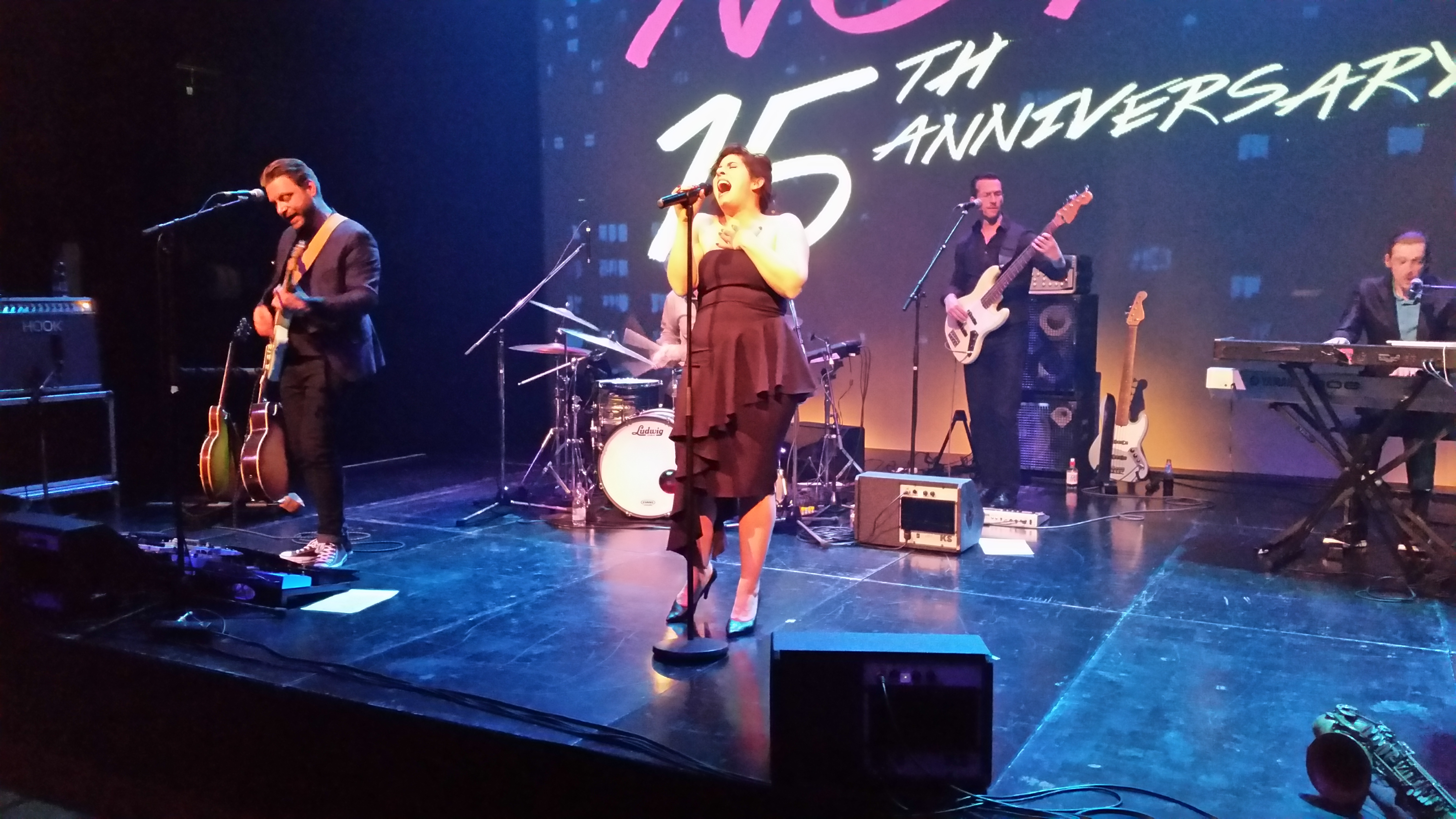
Dorona Alberti

Dorona Alberti (1975, Maastricht) is a Dutch singer and actress whose projects include: the industrial music act KMFDM, Hobson, Fairocious, Old Shoes, Pick up the Pieces, Briskey, and the Dutch/Belgian Lounge group Gare du Nord.

== History ==
Alberti studied theater at the University of Amsterdam and jazz at Rotterdam Conservatory. She began working with KMFDM in 1992, and performed on most of their albums in the 1990s. In 1999, she had a role in a short Dutch-language Flemish film called To Speak, which is available on a compilation DVD titled 10 jaar Leuven Kort.

The singer has collaborated with Dutch bandleader André Rieu, interpreting songs such as "I Will Survive" and "Live is Life" live alongside the Johann Strauss Orchestra. Currently, she resides in the Dutch city of Rotterdam.

== Discography ==
KMFDM

- Money (1992)
- Angst (1993)
- Nihil (1995)
- Xtort (1996)
- Boots (2002)
- Attak (2002)

Gare du Nord

- Sex 'n' Jazz (2007)
- Love For Lunch (2009)
- Lilywhite Soul (2011)
- Lifesexy (2012)
- Stronger! (2015)

== Filmography ==
- 10 jaar leuven kort (2004)
- To speak (1999)
