= Aidan Hughes =

British graphic designer (born 1956)

- Born: 1956; Wallasey, Merseyside, England
- Other name: Brute!
- Occupation: Artist
- Notable work: KMFDM album covers

Aidan Hughes is a commercial artist. He was born in 1956 in Wallasey, Merseyside, England, and was trained as an artist by his father, himself a landscape painter.

== Career ==
In the 1980s, Hughes published a pulp-style magazine called BRUTE!. "Brute!" has become an occasional pseudonym for Hughes as well.

He usually works in a very high contrast style, often black and white, but more often black and white accented with one other color. He claims influence from American comic book artist Jack Kirby, the painter John Martin, and (most apparently) from Russian propaganda posters.

Hughes created most of the album covers for the industrial band KMFDM. Two of their music videos ("A Drug Against War", "Son of a Gun") are animated versions of his' artwork.

His other work has included outdoor murals, including the 75 metre mural in Barga, Italy, during 2003 which has since been covered over with an earth bank; and a wide variety of advertisements, including pieces for the Bank of Scotland, and Guinness.

Hughes is credited for the art design and concept of ZPC (Zero Population Count), a first-person shooter computer game developed in 1996 using the Marathon 2 engine.

In 2017, Hughes co-founded Tweak, a photo-editing app for iOS and Android.

He presently lives and works in the Czech Republic.

== BogArt ==
Hughes joined the BogArt collective in 2006. This street art organisation attempted to subvert the burgeoning graffiti tagging culture by using public toilet advertising space as alternative gallery space. They also produced a number of short films, detailing their art happenings and protests on the streets of Prague, Czech Republic.
