= Günter Schulz =

German musician

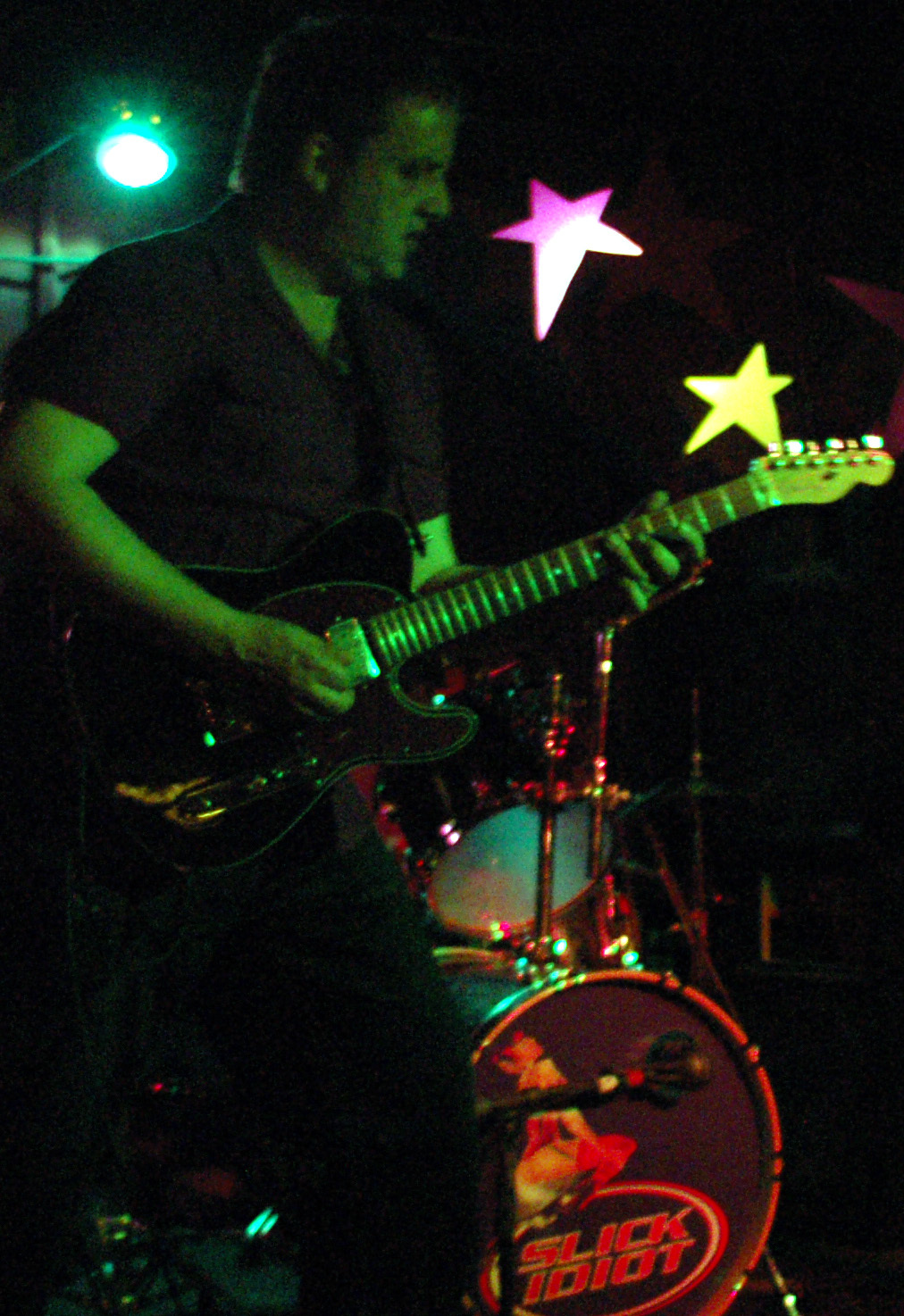
- Schulz in 2010 with Slick Idiot

Background information
- Also known as: Svetlana Ambrosius; Svet Am; King Gruntner
- Born: 26 January 1963 (age 63); Neuenkirchen, West Germany
- Genres: Industrial rock; nu jazz
- Occupations: Musician; songwriter
- Instrument: Guitar
- Years active: 1990–present
- Labels: Wax Trax!; Cleopatra; Sudden Death

Günter Schulz (or Guenter Schulz) is a German musician, songwriter and former member of the industrial band KMFDM.

== Biography ==
Schulz's first credited appearance (as Svetlana Ambrosius, or Svet Am) was on the band KMFDM's album Naïve in 1990, although already having appeared on the "Godlike" single which was released 3 months prior (albeit uncredited). He continued using that stage name until 1995's Nihil. Schulz displayed an impressive mastery of speed metal guitar skills and co-wrote many of KMFDM's songs in the 1990s. He also wrote and performed in various KMFDM side projects, including two albums with Sascha Konietzko's Excessive Force and a solo album by En Esch. He currently resides in Vancouver, Canada.

In early manifestations of the KMFDM website, Schulz maintained a section called "Günter's Guitar Garage." Among other things, he used the space to encourage amateur guitarists to learn formal notation as opposed to tablature.

After KMFDM disbanded in 1999, Schulz and Esch recorded a few songs for tribute albums and then formed Slick Idiot, a band featuring Schulz's trademark guitar and Esch's vocal stylings. The band has, as of 2010, released three studio albums and two remix albums. KMFDM reformed in 2001, though Schulz and Esch rejected Konietzko's offer to return to the fold.

Schulz is interested in photography and took many of the band portraits that appear in KMFDM and Slick Idiot liner notes. Concert attendees also observed Schulz taking pictures of the crowd during KMFDM's Symbols tour (1997). These photos became the material for the video "In Your Face".

Guenter also travelled to Ghana as part of the crew for "So Good, So Far: the Way Forward". He took photographs for the film and documented the trip through his photographic prowess.

In 2005, Schulz announced the formation of a self-titled solo project, Schulz. He was part of PIG's touring line-up in the summer of 2006, thus reuniting with fellow KMFDM alumni Raymond Watts.

In 2016, Schulz toured with Raymond Nainz Watts (a.k.a. PIG) in support of the album The Gospel.

== Discography ==
=== KMFDM ===
- Naïve (1990)
- Money (1992)
- Angst (1993)
- Nihil (1995)
- Xtort (1996)
- Symbols (1997)
- Adios (1999)

=== Excessive Force ===
- Conquer Your World (1991)
- Gentle Death (1993)

=== Pig ===
- Wrecked (1996)
- Genuine American Monster (1999)
- The Gospel (2016)
- The Wages Of Sin (2019)
- Sex & Death (2020)
- Pain Is God (2020)

=== Sow ===
- Sick (1998)

=== With George Sarah ===
- Opus Eleven (2001)

=== Slick Idiot ===
- DickNity (2001)
- Screwtinized (2004)
- S U C K S E S S (2009)

=== With Mona Mur & En Esch ===
- Do With Me What You Want (2011)

=== Schulz ===
- What Apology (2006)
