= Soft Ballet =

Japanese band

- Origin: Japan
- Genres: Synthpop; new wave; electro-industrial; EBM; alternative dance
- Years active: 1985–1995; 2002–2003
- Labels: Alfa Records (1989–1992); Victor Entertainment (1992–1995); Warner Music Group (2002–2003)
- Past members: Maki Fujii; Ken Morioka; Ryoichi Endo Live members Toshio Komiya; Tsuguhito Tsukada; Wataru Kamiryo; Norihiro Isiduka; Masanori Mukotaka; Shingo Tomoda; Takashi Fujita; Hitoshi Kusonoki; Naoki Hirai

Soft Ballet was a Japanese electronic group formed in 1985. The group consisted of three members, Maki Fujii, Ken Morioka, and Ryoichi Endo, though they employed extra support members for live shows. While Soft Ballet weren't necessarily chart toppers, they had a strong cult following and were considered pioneers of modern electronic music in Japan in the 1990s.

== History ==
=== Formation and Alfa Records Years ===
Soft Ballet was formed in 1985 as a side-project when Ken Morioka and Ryoichi Endo (who had already been working together in a band called Volaju) joined with Maki Fujii. That year, the trio released their first single Tokio Bang!, which was released in very limited quantities, making it a sought after collector's item today. Ken Morioka at the time was also already in the band Granny Takes a Trip, which split in 1988. Afterwards, Soft Ballet became a full-fledged band. Their combination of light synthpop with hard European-style EBM attracted great attention for being a unique presence on the then-current Japanese music scene. After releasing a handful of songs on indie labels, the group was signed to Alfa Records in 1989 and immediately released their debut album, Earth Born. The album proved to be a success and the band toured extensively for it, leading to a concert being filmed professionally and released to home video early the next year. In this time Ken and Maki assisted famed video game composer Yuzo Koshiro with his soundtrack for The Scheme.

In 1990 the band released two albums; First came their sophomore album, Document, followed later by a "mini-album", 3 [drai]. This mini-album was intended as a showcase for each individual member, with Ken, Maki, and Ryoichi each composing and performing a song separately from the rest of the band. The three each came at it from completely different styles- Ken made a relaxing pop number, Maki made a hardcore industrial song, and Ryoichi (with Maki handling the arrangement) put together a slow, ponderous ballad- effectively showing the three completely different sides that the band mixes together to form a typical Soft Ballet song.

1991 saw the band taking a political stance with the release of one of their most successful albums of all time, 愛と平和. The album took a hard anti-war stance (most explicitly against the Gulf War) and displayed this aggression by embracing the band's industrial and EBM influence more than any of their past work. 愛と平和 was Soft Ballet's first album to reach the Oricon Top 10, and this new level of success brought them to the attention of a bigger record company, Victor Entertainment. It was also named one of the top albums from 1989-1998 in a 2004 issue of the music magazine Band Yarouze.

Though Soft Ballet left Alpha by the end of 1991, Alpha continued to capitalize off the band's success by releasing remix albums. These remix albums, Alter Ego in 1992 and Twist And Turn in 1993, were notable for featuring exclusively Western remixers, including big names such as Richard D. James (under his Polygon Window alias), 808 State, LFO, and Cabaret Voltaire among others. This was among the first times that a Japanese band had participated in such an international remix exchange, and these albums became the first Soft Ballet material that was circulated in the West.

=== XEO Invitation Years ===
Soft Ballet moved over to Victor Entertainment by 1992, signing to a newly created sublabel called XEO Invitation. Million Mirrors, Soft Ballet's 5th album, was XEO's first album release and once more they broke into the Top 10. Though some songs were circulated on XEO Invitation promotional samplers, no songs from Million Mirrors were released as singles in Japan. However, in a rare move, the band released "Threshold" as a 12-inch single in the United Kingdom, through Blue August Records.

Soft Ballet released their first singles on XEO in 1993, "Engaging Universe" followed by "White Shaman", which proved to be some of their biggest hits and earning them guest performances on multiple TV shows. The following album, Incubate, showcased the most diverse collection of styles in the band's history. Incorporating alternative rock, jazz, EBM, and pure noise, the album could be said to contain both their most accessible as well as most abstract songs.

Perhaps the extreme musical diversity was a sign of the band's growing inner turmoil, because the group took time off in 1994 in order for Maki and Ken to explore other musical endeavors. Maki teamed with Hisashi Imai of Buck-Tick, and a slew of British artists (including Raymond Watts, Meat Beat Manifesto, and Julianne Regan) to release an album as Schaft, while Ken traveled Europe to record a solo album. Soft Ballet did go on a sold-out five-stop tour with Luna Sea and Buck-Tick titled LSB between August 9 and 30, 1994. It is now looked at as a legendary tour in Japanese rock, not only due to the three headlining acts coming together, but because the then up-and-coming guest acts, The Yellow Monkey, L'Arc-en-Ciel, The Mad Capsule Markets and Die in Cries, all went on to achieve success.

The trio regrouped in order to record for a new album and, in a first for the band, wrote most songs collaboratively. Up to this point, with the exception of one song off Million Mirrors, the band members had never co-written lyrics or co-composed music. However the material from these new sessions featured much collaboration, as well as members changing roles (Ryoichi composing music and Ken and Maki writing lyrics). Despite this new team dynamic, conflicts within the band-members continued and the group announced that they'd split up after the release of their new album and a final concert series. Form came out in 1995 and became the most successful album of their entire career. This was followed by a remix album, Forms: Remix For Ordinary People, which once more exclusively featured non-Japanese remixers and was released in collaboration with SSR Records.

After playing a three night concert series in Tokyo, Soft Ballet disbanded on July 23, 1995. To close out their career, they released a self-titled compilation album (though it is sometimes listed under the name The Ultimate Best Of Soft Ballet). Though ostensibly a "Best Of" album, it actually consisted mostly of new material. Of the two-disc set's 22 songs, 15 were completely new recordings of old songs.

=== Activities During Break-Up ===
Ryoichi immediately moved on to his own band called The Ends (later renamed to just "Ends"), releasing a new album in 1996 and every year since then until the band's reunion. While Ends never reached the same heights as Soft Ballet, it is arguably the most successful post-Soft Ballet project of any of the members.

Ken engaged in a number of musical activities. In addition to a solo career, he composed the soundtrack for the popular anime series Kaikan Phrase, began doing session and production work for artists such as Demon Kogure, Feel, Hikaru Kotobuki and Losalios, and engaged in one-off collaborations such as forming the group Suicide with Issay of Der Zibet for a Japan tribute album.

Maki had the most sporadic output during the group's breakup period. While Ryoichi had one consistent band, and Ken had a constant stream of different projects, Maki mostly participated in one-off projects. His first act outside the band was to return to Alfa Records to release Maki Fujii Assembled, an album of remixes of songs he composed for Soft Ballet (though all song titles were changed to disguise the fact that they were Soft Ballet songs). In the following years he appeared as a guest collaborator on albums by Ryuichi Kawamura (of Luna Sea), Mari Hamada and Zilch, and produced the debut album of the band Epidemic. In 1999 he established the project She Shell, but only two singles were ever released before the project was seemingly abandoned. Notably, She Shell was among the first acts to ever do a remix for Ayumi Hamasaki.

=== Reunion Years ===
The group had considered reforming for some time, but Maki had been the last holdout. Finally in 2002, the trio came to an agreement and Soft Ballet officially reunited. They made their return to the stage at the 2002 Summer Sonic Festival, and began recording together for the first time since 1995. The resulting album, Symbiont (released on EastWest Japan), showcased an updated sound, taking advantage of the leaps in digital music technology that had occurred since they last worked together. The album was a moderate success, but the wave of popularity that the band was riding when they broke up had now passed.

The band played a handful of live dates through the end of 2002 and toured again at the start of 2003, and released a new single, "Bright My Way". For reasons that aren't clear, the band left EastWest Japan in the middle of the year and their next single, "Smashing The Sun" was released through Warner Music Japan. In the final quarter of 2003, Soft Ballet released Menopause which (as of 2014) is their final album. True to its title, Menopause was a mature album coming at topics with an older perspective. Notably, its final track (which is also, to-date, the final new Soft Ballet song), "土縋り", is the only song in the band's entire catalogue with a fully Japanese title.

After embarking on one final tour in December, Soft Ballet disbanded again on December 17, 2003. This final show was filmed by the crew, and later released to DVD in 2013.

=== Post-Breakup Releases ===
Thanks to the band's strong cult following, Soft Ballet continued to release work after their disbandment. In addition to a series of compilation albums issued around the time of the break-up, Soft Ballet began offering work through Sony Music Direct. Albums and videos were offered for pre-order and, if a certain number of orders were placed, the releases would be printed on demand in a limited edition. Media released through this system include a DVD box set of early Soft Ballet concert videos, remastered reissues of the band's first four albums initially released on Alfa Records, and a DVD of the band's final concert from 2003. Most notable may be Index–Soft Ballet 1989–1995, a massive 11-disc set of almost all songs, live tracks, and remixes the band released from 1989 to 1995. All songs were remastered under Maki Fujii, and extensive liner notes were included. As a bonus, never-before-released studio recordings of special live arrangements were included on the final disc. This set is extremely rare and highly valued, and regularly goes for close to 100,000 JPY at auction.

== Post-Soft Ballet Works ==
=== Ryoichi Endo ===
When Soft Ballet broke up, Ryoichi immediately returned to his band, Ends. It seems he was influenced by his time working with Soft Ballet again, due to the new directs that Ends took from this point forward. While previous Ends material mainly had a hard rock/classic rock style, this post-Soft Ballet material was far more electronic in nature. 2004's The Counter made use of modern synthesizers and mixed sped-up drum breaks with modern sounding pop rock. 2005's Found took this new direction even further, with songs that could be described as outright techno. As of 2014, Found remains ENDS' most recent studio album and the band last played live in 2009. After 15 years of silence, magazine Visual Music Japan (VMJ) found Endo whom confessed about his return to the music scene in 2024.

=== Ken Morioka ===
After the dissolution of Soft Ballet, Ken Morioka returned to his myriad of projects. He returned to his solo work, self-releasing a steady stream of singles and albums (including two collaborative albums; One with Daijiro Nozawa and one with the band ZIZ) which continues until the present. On the side, Morioka returned to session work, writing and/or touring with Mell, Tomoyasu Hotei, Kaya, Buck-Tick, and more. He contributed to soundtracks, including the game Dream Club Zero, the movie "記憶の音楽Gb", and "Ghost In The Shell Tribute Album Ver 2.0.0".

In 2009, Ken and Masayuki Deguchi (formerly of the band Grass Valley) formed a new band, Gentleman Take Polaroid, and released one album together. In 2013, Ken took part in two supergroups; the first was KA.F.KA led by Masami Tsuchiya, the second was a backing band for a posthumous performance by hide. In 2014, Ken announced that he and Maki Fujii would be uniting to form a new group called minus(-). minus(-) released two mini-albums through 2014 and 2015, D and G, before Morioka died of heart failure on June 3, 2016.

=== Maki Fujii ===
Maki Fujii continued to be sporadic in his output. He spent the first years following the end of Soft Ballet working on the solo projects of Atsushi Sakurai and Kirito, while simultaneously working on his new band, Suilen. Fujii worked with Kirito for years, but when Kirito joined a new band in 2007 and therefore ended his solo project, Fujii took this as the time to put focus on his own band. Suilen released their first mini-album 音ヲ孕ム in 2007 and released three more mini-albums between then and 2009. Suilen also contributed music to the Hellsing OVA series in 2009.

In 2008, Suilen played a triple bill show with acid android and Hisashi Imai's band Lucy. As a special encore, Fujii and Imai reunited as Schaft with Yukihiro on drums for a performance of Schaft's song "The HEROINside". In 2010, Suilen embarked on their last tour to-date, and Fujii contributed to two acid android albums. Fujii then dropped out of the public eye completely, releasing no music and abandoning all social media outlets. It wasn't until 2014 when Ken Morioka announced that he and Fujii would be forming a new group called minus (-), that any news about Fujii's status was given.

== Discography ==
=== Studio albums ===
- Earth Born (1989)
- Document (1990)
- 3 [drai] (Mini LP) (1990)
- 愛と平和 (1991) (pronounced "Ai to Heiwa", meaning "Love and Peace")
- Million Mirrors (1992)
- Incubate (1993)
- Form (1995)
- Symbiont (2002)
- Menopause (2003)

=== Singles ===
- "Tokio Bang!" (1987)
- "Body to Body"† (1989)
- "Body to Body"† (1989)
- "Twist of Love" (1990)
- "Escape -Rebuild" (1990)
- "Ego Dance" (1991)
- "Final" (1991)
- "Threshold" (1993)
- "Engaging Universe" (1993)
- "White Shaman" (1993)
- "You" (1995)
- "Merchendiver" (2002)
- "Bright My Way" (2003)
- "Smashing the Sun" (2003)

†Note these two singles are not the same. The first was released on an independent label at the start of 1989. When the band was picked up by a major label, they re-wrote and re-recorded "Body To Body" and released it again later the same year.

=== Live album ===
- Reiz [raits] (1992)

=== Compilations ===
- Single Collection '89–'91 (1993)
- Soft Ballet (1995)
- Super Best Of Soft Ballet (1996)
- Soft Ballet 1989–1991 the Best (2003)
- Soft Ballet 1992–1995 the Best + 8 Other Mixes (2003)
- Index–Soft Ballet 1989–1995 (2009)

=== Remix albums ===
- Alter Ego (1992)
- Twist and Turn (1993)
- Forms (1995)
