= Funkyhell =

funkyhell

Studio album by haloblack
- Released: October 1, 1996
- Studio: Various: Bit; (Minneapolis, Minnesota); Synergy; (Minneapolis, Minnesota); Twist; (New York City)
- Genre: Industrial rock
- Length: 43:38
- Label: Fifth Colvmn
- Producer: Bryan Barton

Haloblack chronology
raw tension e.p. (1995)	funkyhell (1996)	Throb (2004)

Alternative cover
- Limited edition cover

funkyhell (or sylized as :funkyhell:) is the second studio album by haloblack, released on November 1, 1994, by Fifth Colvmn Records. The album represented the band's musical shift from a guitar dominated syle into a minimalist approach to dark ambient and electronic music composition.

== Reception ==
Professional ratings
Review scores
Source	Rating
AllMusic	3/5 stars

Aiding & Abetting gave funkyhell a positive review, saying "I love "dirty" electronic music albums" and "Bryan Black (aka Haloblack) has crafted a fine set of experimental industrial tunes. Tom Schulte of AllMusic called the album "an impressionistic headspace, electronica incompatible for the dancefloors of even neo-gothic club nights." Last Sigh Magazine praised the contributions of the guest artists and said "it continues right where Tension Filter left off, the sound remains constant and is just as good if not better than Tension Filter."

More negative in their critique of the album was Option, who was critical of "the relentless 4/4 beats, the cheap arcade video game soundtracks, the pseudo-creepy whispered vocals and the campy banality of heaaawvy lyrics." Sonic Boom criticized the band's lack of musical progression from their previous work and stated "there is zero deviation in the whispered vocal arrangement, all of the percussion loops are extremely stifled, and many of the sounds are reused from track to track."

== Track listing ==
All tracks are written by Bryan Barton.

No.	Title	Length
1.	"Distractor"	5:19
2.	"Regulator"	4:18
3.	"Nympho"	4:52
4.	"Lovesick"	5:14
5.	"Drylips"	4:30
6.	"Bounded"	1:52
7.	"Fragment"	3:46
8.	"Resonance"	3:46
9.	"Seducto"	3:04
10.	"Into the Tension Filter"	3:45
11.	"Untitled"	3:12

== Personnel ==
Adapted from the funkyhell liner notes.

haloblack

- Bryan Barton (as Bryan Black) – vocals, instruments, production, mixing, cover art, recording (1–8)

Additional performers

- Joel Allard – guitar (3, 5, 6, 8), feedback (2)
- John "Servo" DeSalvo – drum programming (6), drums (7)
- Charles Levi – bass guitar (1, 3, 4, 7, 11)
- Krayge Tyler – guitar (1, 4, 7, 11)
- Ned Wahl – bass guitar (2, 5, 6, 8)

Production and design

- Zalman Fishman – executive-production
- John Golden – recording (1–8), engineering and mixing (2, 3, 5, 6, 8)
- Dan Hoyt – mixing (1, 4, 7, 11), engineering (1, 4, 7)
- Martin Thomas – mastering

== Release history ==
Region	Date	Label	Format	Catalog
United States	1996	Fifth Colvmn	CD	9868-63182
