= Sick City =

Sick City may refer to:

- "Sick City", a song by Elton John, the B-side of the single "Don't Let the Sun Go Down on Me"
- "Sick City", a song by PIG from the album Praise the Lard
