= Throb =

Throb may also refer to:

- "Throb" (song), a 1993 song by Janet Jackson
- Throb (Gary Burton album), 1969
- Throb (haloblack album), 2004
- The Throb, a 1960s Australian band
- The Throbs, a 1980s/'90s American band
- Robert Young (musician) (1964–2014), Scottish guitarist in Primal Scream, nicknamed "Throb"
- site of the Throb nightclub disaster in South Africa
- Throb (TV series), an American 1980's sitcom
