= HB2 (EP) =

EP by haloblack
- Released: February 10, 1992
- Recorded: February 7 – February 9, 1992
- Studio: Danger Studios (Minneapolis, Minnesota).
- Genre: Industrial rock
- Length: 11:39
- Producer: Bryan Barton; Carl White

Haloblack chronology
HB2 (1992)	rESONANCE (1992)

Alternative cover
- Digital cover

HB2 is the debut EP by haloblack, self-released on February 10, 1992. The album comprises a collection of demos that were recorded in 1992 with the intention of being part of the band's debut Tension Filter.

== Reception ==
CAKE Music gave HB2 a positive review and said haloblack's "beatbox and bass, with buzzsaw melodies and dissonant droning vocals become an emotional biopsy drill for your average, sensitive, new-age guy." Industrialnation awarded the release five out of five possible stars and made note of the energetic performances.

== Track listing ==
All tracks are written by Bryan Barton.

Side one
No.	Title	Length
1.	"What You Mean"	4:19

Side two
No.	Title	Length
1.	"Get Your Balance"	3:42
2.	"Everything Inside"	3:38

== Personnel ==
Adapted from the HB2 liner notes.

haloblack

- Bryan Barton (as Bryan Black) – vocals, instruments, production, engineering

Production and design

- Carl White – production, engineering

== Release history ==
Region	Date	Label	Format	Catalog
United States	1992		CS	
United States	2011		DL	
