= The Swining =

Studio album by PIG
- Released: 1993
- Recorded: Ranch Apocalypse, London
- Genre: Post-industrial
- Length: 44:23
- Label: Afta
- Producer: Raymond Watts, Jon Caffery

PIG chronology
A Stroll in the Pork (1992)	The Swining (1993)	Red Raw & Sore (1994)

Singles from The Swining
- 1. "The Fountain of Miracles" Released: March 1993; 2. "Red Raw & Sore" Released: March 1994

Alternative cover
- 1999 re-release cover

Professional ratings
Review scores
Source	Rating
AllMusic	4/5 stars

The Swining is a 1993 album released by Raymond Watts (as PIG). It was released exclusively in Japan, being re-released in the United States by Cleopatra Records in 1999 as part of The Swining/Red Raw & Sore. Music videos for the songs "The Fountain of Miracles" and "The Seven Veils" were filmed but remain unreleased outside Japan. They exist in bootleg form around the internet and on YouTube.

== Release ==
The album was originally released by Alfa in Japan in 1993, but in America, in 1999, Cleopatra remastered the album with different tracks as "The Swining / Red Raw & Sore. In this album, two versions of the song "Rope" were swapped, and "Symphony for the Devil" was edited. The song "The Fountain of Failure" is formally known as "The Fountain of Miracles (Anal-Log Mix) (Instrumental)", from the single The Fountain of Miracles.

== Track listing ==
=== Original (Japanese) release ===
1. "The Fountain of Miracles" – 5:51
2. "The Seven Veils" – 4:08
3. "Rope" – 4:43
4. "Find It, Fuck It, Forget It" – 2:49
5. "Black Mambo" – 5:05
6. "Ojo Por Ojo" – 2:15
7. "Blades" – 6:40
8. "Symphony for the Devil" – 12:43

=== US release ===
1. "The Fountain of Miracles" – 5:52
2. "The Seven Veils" – 4:10
3. "Rope (Keith LeBlanc Remix)" – 4:32
4. "Find It, Fuck It, Forget It" – 2:51
5. "Black Mambo" – 5:07
6. "Ojo Por Ojo" – 2:18
7. "Blades" – 6:42
8. "Symphony for the Devil" – 11:58
9. "Red Raw & Sore" – 5:40
10. "Rope" – 4:46
11. "Blades (KMFDM Mix)" – 6:02
12. "The Fountain of Miracles (Pig Remix)" – 6:35
13. "One Meatball" – 5:19
14. "The Fountain of Failure" – 7:10

All songs were written by Raymond Watts.

== Personnel ==
- Raymond Watts – vocals, programming
- Karl Hyde – guitars
- Steve White – guitars (3, 9, 11–14)
- Enrico Thomaso – flugelhorn
- Sugar J – breaks (3, 10, 14)
- Mike Watts – backing vocals
