= Red Raw & Sore =

EP by PIG
- Released: 1994
- Recorded: Ranch Apocalypse
- Genre: Industrial
- Length: 28:38
- Label: Alfa Records
- Producer: Raymond Watts, Jon Caffery

PIG chronology
| The Swining (1993) | Red Raw & Sore (1994) | Sin Sex & Salvation (1994) |

Red Raw & Sore is a 1994 EP released by Raymond Watts (as PIG). Released exclusively in Japan, Red Raw & Sore contains two original tracks, "Red Raw & Sore" and "One Meatball", as well as three remixes of songs from The Swining, "Rope", "Blades" and "The Fountain of Miracles". Red Raw & Sore was re-released in the United States in 1999 by Cleopatra Records as part of The Swining/Red Raw & Sore.

== Track listing ==
1. "Red Raw & Sore" – 5:40
2. "Rope (Keith LeBlanc Remix)" – 4:32
3. "Blades (KMFDM Mix)" – 6:32
4. "The Fountain of Miracles (PIG Remix)" – 6:35
5. "One Meatball" – 5:19

All tracks written by Raymond Watts, except track 1 written by Raymond Watts and Steve White.

== Personnel ==
- Raymond Watts
- Steve White – guitar
- Karl Hyde – guitar
- Enrico Thomaso – trumpet
