= Switch (EP) =

Remix album / EP by Schaft
- Released: October 21, 1994
- Recorded: Victor Aoyama Studio, Inning Recording Hostler, Master Rock Studios (UK), Ranch Apocalypse (UK), Matrix Recording Studio (UK), Livingston Studios (UK)
- Genre: Industrial
- Length: 40:24
- Label: Victor Entertainment
- Producer: Maki Fujii, Hisashi Imai, Raymond Watts

Schaft chronology
Switchblade (1994)	Switch (1994)	Ultra (2016)

Switch is a 1994 remix EP by Schaft. Switch is a companion release to Switchblade, which is where the original versions of the remixes come from.

== Track listing ==
No.	Title	Remixer	Length
1.	"Arbor Vitate" (Tilt Mix)	Dillon Gallagher	5:03
2.	"Cold Light" (nicht regelrecht)	Maki Fujii	5:31
3.	"Nothing Personal"	Raymond Watts	2:47
4.	"SKF10047" (Life in Net mix)	Logic Freaks (Yuji Sugiyama)	9:34
5.	"Visual Cortex" (The Reload Re-definition)	Reload	6:31
6.	"inFORMation" (disinFORMation)	Meat Beat Manifesto	4:50
7.	"Cold Light" (Keim)	Fujii	6:08
