= Painiac =

EP by PIG
- Released: February 22, 1995
- Recorded: Ranch Apocalypse, The Forum, London
- Genre: Industrial
- Length: 24:31
- Label: Invitation
- Producer: Raymond Watts

PIG chronology
Sin Sex & Salvation (1994)	Painiac (1995)	Sinsation (1995)

Painiac is a 1995 EP released by Raymond Watts (as PIG). Painiac has only ever been released in Japan. The version of the song "Painiac" that appears on this single is that of an earlier recording than the version that appears on Sinsation and does not contain the dialogue sample "nothing touches me".

== Track listing ==
1. "Painiac" – 5:08
2. "Lamentous Momentous" – 4:53
3. "Find It Fuck It Forget It" (Live) – 3:00
4. "Painiac (Rattle & Cum Mix)" – 5:24
5. "Painiac (Mekon/Artery Mix)" – 6:04

All tracks written by Raymond Watts.

== Personnel ==
- Raymond Watts
- Steve White – guitar
- Santos de Castro – drums (3)
- Anna Wildsmith – additional lyrics
