= Prime Evil (EP) =

EP by PIG
- Released: 22 January 1997
- Recorded: Ranch Apocalypse, London
- Genre: Industrial
- Length: 42:01
- Label: Victor Entertainment
- Producer: Raymond Watts

PIG chronology
Wrecked (1996)	Prime Evil (1997)	No One Gets Out of Her Alive (1998)

Professional ratings
Review scores
Source	Rating
Allmusic	1.5/5 stars

Prime Evil is a 1997 EP released by Raymond Watts (as PIG) It was released exclusively in Japan as a follow-up to 1996's Wrecked. It features four remixes of tracks from Wrecked as well as a cover of Black Sabbath's "War Pigs" and the original tracks "Prime Evil" and "The Keeper of the Margarita".

== Track listing ==
1. "Prime Evil" (Raymond Watts, Steve White) – 6:41
2. "Wrecked (Ken Ishii Remix)" (Watts, White) – 6:38
3. "War Pigs" (Tony Iommi, Ozzy Osbourne, Geezer Butler, Bill Ward) – 6:25
4. "Everything (PIG Remix)" (Watts, Santos de Castro) – 4:29
5. "The Keeper of the Margarita" (Watts, White) – 6:07
6. "Save Me (Locust Remix)" (Watts) – 4:58
7. "Silt (Euphonic Remix)" (Watts) – 6:41

== Personnel ==
- Raymond Watts
- Steve White
- Giles Littlefield – additional noise and programming
- Jo Maskell – vocals (3)
