= Haloblack =

American industrial rock group

haloblack
- Origin: Minneapolis, Minnesota, United States
- Genre: Industrial rock
- Years active: 1992–present
- Labels: Fifth Colvmn, Armalyte Industries, The Sick City
- Past members: Bryan Black; Olivier Grasset; Bill Morrisette; Damien Ray; Arianne Schreiber
- Website: haloblack.info (Domain Expired)

haloblack are an American industrial rock group formed in Minneapolis, Minnesota, United States. The original incarnation consisted solely of Bryan Barton (as Bryan Black) until Bill Morrisette and Damien Ray joined. Their style of industrial rock combined elements of electro, glitch, trip hop and metal music. They have been on tour with other industrial outfits including 16volt, Bile, Chemlab and Cop Shoot Cop and in addition supported Marilyn Manson. The band released three albums: Tension Filter and funkyhell for Fifth Colvmn Records and Throb for Armalyte Industries/The Sick City.

== History ==
haloblack was formed in Minneapolis, Minnesota by Bryan Barton (as Bryan Black). His first release was the cassette HB2 in 1992. Musicians Bill Morrisette and Damien Ray joined to Barton make haloblack into a band and Fifth Colvmn Records signed them in 1994, releasing the band's debut album titled Tension Filter in November. The music was favorably compared to Trent Reznor of Nine Inch Nails and the compositional depth received praise. The band followed that release in 1995 with the EP titled raw tension e.p.. haloblack moved to a less guitar driven sound for their third and final full-length album funkyhell, released in 1996 for Fifth Colvmn. The album was highly informed by electronica music and lead with the track "Distractor", which had previously appeared on the Fascist Communist Revolutionaries various artists compilation. In 1997 Haloblack has received commissions to score sonic backgrounds for 3D video games.

After the haloblack's second album Barton moved from Minneapolis to London in the late 90s. After being inspired to write again after listening extensively to Maxinquaye by Tricky and other electronic music Barton began working on a third album. The band released Throb on the United Kingdom-based music labels Armalyte Industries and The Sick City. The album was made with collaborative efforts of musicians Kraig Tyler, Charles Levi, Raymond Watts and Olivier Grasset.

== Discography ==
Studio albums

- Tension Filter (1994, Fifth Colvmn)
- funkyhell (1996, Fifth Colvmn)
- Throb (2004, Armalyte Industries/The Sick City)

Extended play

- HB2 (1992)
- raw tension e.p. (1995, Fifth Colvmn)

Compilation albums

- rESONANCE (1992)
