= Wrecked (album) =

Studio album by PIG
- Released: 24 July 1996
- Recorded: Ranch Apocalypse, London
- Genre: Industrial rock
- Length: 58:17; 56:59 (American release)
- Label: Invitation Records
- Producer: Raymond Watts

PIG chronology
Sinsation (1995)	Wrecked (1996)	Prime Evil (1997)

Professional ratings
Review scores
Source	Rating
Allmusic	2.5/5 stars

Wrecked is a 1996 album released by Raymond Watts (as PIG). Wrecked was originally released in Japan in 1996, and was later released in the United States on 16 September 1997 by Wax Trax/TVT Records. Each release is different, with different track run times, as well as different tracks present. A promotional video for "Everything" exists, but remains unreleased outside Japan.

== Track listing ==
=== Original (Japanese) release ===
1. "Wrecked" – 7:19
2. "The Book of Tequila" – 6:17
3. "Everything" – 3:43
4. "Find It, Fuck It, Forget It (Regret It Mix)" – 3:39
5. "Save Me" – 4:51
6. "The Only Good One's a Dead One" – 5:40
7. "Fuck Me I'm Sick" – 6:52
8. "My Sanctuary (Spent Sperm Mix)" – 6:39
9. "Blades (Slash Mix)" – 6:37
10. "Silt" – 6:33

=== US release ===
1. "Wrecked" – 7:19
2. "No One Gets Out of Her Alive" – 5:52
3. "Everything" – 3:44
4. "Contempt" – 4:32
5. "Save Me" – 4:52
6. "The Only Good One's a Dead One" – 5:40
7. "Blades (Slash Mix)" – 6:11
8. "Find It, Fuck It, Forget It (Sump Mix)" – 4:43
9. "My Sanctuary (Spent Sperm Mix)" – 7:31
10. "Silt" – 6:35

=== 12" 2017 Tour Edition ===
1. "Wrecked"
2. "The Book of Tequila"
3. "Everything (2017 Remaster)"
4. "Find It, Fuck It, Forget It (Regret It Mix)"
5. "Save Me"
6. "The Only Good One's a Dead One"
7. "Fuck Me I'm Sick"
8. "My Sanctuary (Spent Sperm Mix)"
9. "Blades (Slash Mix)"
10. "Silt"
11. "Strength Through Submission (Short)"
12. "No One Gets Out Of Her Alive"
13. "Contempt"
14. "Find It, Fuck It, Forget It (Sump Mix)"
15. "Fuck Me I'm Sick (As Fuck)"
16. "Strength Through Submission (Long)"

All tracks written by Raymond Watts, except "Wrecked" written by Raymond Watts and Steve White, and "Everything" written by Raymond Watts and Santos de Castro.

== Personnel ==
- Raymond Watts – vocals, programming
- Steve White – guitars, programming

=== Additional Personnel ===
- Günter Schulz – guitars
- Rob Henry – programming
- Atsushi Sakurai – backing vocals on "No One Gets Out of Her Alive" and "Contempt"
- Hisashi Imai – guitars on "No One Gets Out of Her Alive" and "Contempt"
- Jennie Bellestar – backing vocals
- Ruth McArdle – backing vocals
- Lian Warmington – backing vocals
- Julian Beeston – programming
- James Reynolds – additional engineering
- Ben Drakeford – additional engineering
- Giles Littlefield – additional programming
