= Praise the Lard =

Studio album by PIG
- Released: 1991
- Genre: Post-industrial
- Length: 42:46 (LP); 52:01 (CD)
- Label: Concrete
- Producer: Raymond Watts, JG Thirlwell, John Caffery

PIG chronology
A Poke in the Eye... with a Sharp Stick (1988)	Praise the Lard (1991)	A Stroll in the Pork (1992)

Professional ratings
Review scores
Source	Rating
AllMusic	3/5 stars

Praise the Lard is the second full-length album by PIG (Raymond Watts), initially released on Concrete Productions in 1991 and re-released by Cleopatra Records in 1997. It features a guest appearance by JG Thirlwell of Foetus as a mixer on one track. "Sick City" was released as a single two years prior to Praise the Lard, and "My Sanctuary" in particular was re-visited twice by Watts (heavily remixed for the 1996 PIG album Wrecked and completely re-recorded for the 2001 Schwein album Schweinstein).

The re-released version has an incorrect track listing, due to the use of artwork from the original LP version. Cleopatra Records reissued the album after "purchasing" the rights from someone who did not legally own them. Watts has indicated his desire to re-release the album, possibly with bonus tracks, but the album is currently unavailable in all markets (as of 2025).

== Track listing ==
1. "My Sanctuary" (Raymond Watts) – 5:49
2. "Gravy Train" (Watts) – 3:46
3. "Angel" (Watts) – 4:04
4. "Valley of the Ignorant" (Watts) – 3:38
5. "A Touch of Upheaval" (Watts) – 3:35
6. "Infinite Shame" (Watts) – 4:07
7. "Hog Love" (Watts, Anna Wildsmith) – 3:55
8. "Sweet Child" (Watts) – 5:51
9. "Sweat and Sour" (Watts) – 1:43
10. "Blood Slicked Highway" (Watts) – 5:16
11. "¡Toxico!" (Watts) – 5:11
12. "Sick City" (Watts) – 5:08

== Personnel ==
- Raymond Watts – vocals, all instruments, recording (tracks 4, 5, 8, 10)
- Mike Watts – organ (track 3)
- Paul Kendall – mixing (tracks 6, 9)
- JG Thirlwell – mixing (track 12)
- Paul Coleman – recording (tracks 1–3, 6, 7, 9)
- Anna Wildsmith – additional lyrics (track 6)
