= Throb (haloblack album) =

Studio album by haloblack
- Released: February 16, 2004
- Recorded: 1999 – 2003
- Genre: Industrial rock
- Length: 41:42
- Label: Armalyte Industries/The Sick City
- Producer: Bryan Barton

Haloblack chronology
funkyhell (1996)	Throb (2004)

Throb (or sylized as throb.) is the third studio album by haloblack, released on February 16, 2004 by Armalyte Industries and The Sick City. The album's recording began after Bryan Barton moved from Minneapolis to London in the late 1990s. Barton became inspired to return to his musical roots and compose again after extensively listening to electronic music and Tricky's 1995 album Maxinquaye. The album was made with collaborative efforts of musicians Kraig Tyler, Charles Levi, Raymond Watts, and Olivier Grasse.

== Reception ==
Release Magazine gave Throb eight out of ten "R's", calling the music "strikingly inventive" and "consistently good." C. Parker of The Wire criticized the mediocre writing and said "from the crackling interference, supine adolescent questioning and maladroit thudding of "Why?" through to the soggy bassline on the closing "Drugbeat". this is one long, unalleviated exercise in gloom and despondency."

== Track listing ==
All tracks are written by Bryan Barton, except co-written where noted.

No.	Title	Writer(s)	Length
1.	"Why?"		2:21
2.	"Feel"	Olivier Grasset	3:32
3.	"Vapour"	Krayge Tyler	3:55
4.	"My Sacred"	Arianne Schreiber, Krayge Tyler	3:28
5.	"Junky"		4:30
6.	"Out There"	Arianne Schreiber	3:11
7.	"Punch the Deck"		2:21
8.	"Love Méchante"		3:23
9.	"Tonight My Body Feels So Tight"		4:45
10.	"Permanence"		2:44
11.	"So Volatile"		1:50
12.	"Drugbeat"	Krayge Tyler	5:42

== Personnel ==
Adapted from the Throb liner notes.

haloblack

- Bryan Barton (as Bryan Black) – production, mastering, vocals (2, 3, 5, 8, 9, 11, 12)

Additional performers

- Toby Doig – feedback (9, 11)
- Jules Hodgson – guitar (5)
- Charles Levi – bass guitar (6)
- Jun Onose (as J) – bass guitar (7)
- Arianne Schreiber – production, vocals (3–7, 9, 12)
- Krayge Tyler – production, guitar (3, 4, 7, 12)

Production and design

- Olivier Grasset – additional production (3), additional programming (5)
- Sachiko Tozawa – mastering
- Raymond Watts – production (5), vocals (7)

== Release history ==
Region	Date	Label	Format	Catalog
United States	2004	Armalyte Industries/The Sick City	CD	ARMCD005, CAT0204
