= Sinsation =

Studio album by PIG
- Released: April 1995
- Recorded: Ranch Apocalypse, London
- Genre: Industrial rock
- Length: 46:28
- Label: JVC; Nothing
- Producer: Raymond Watts

PIG chronology
Painiac (1995)	Sinsation (1995)	Wrecked (1996)

Professional ratings
Review scores
Source	Rating
Allmusic	3/5 stars

Sinsation is an album by PIG released in Japan in 1995. It was later released in the United States on Nothing Records on 17 September 1996. A music video for the song "Painiac (Nothing Touches Me)" was filmed and scarcely aired on MTV in 1996; making its final broadcast in 2000 on MTV2's A-Z video marathon.

== Track listing ==
1. "Serial Killer Thriller" – 6:16
2. "Hamstrung on the Highway" – 5:34
3. "Golgotha" – 1:40
4. "The Sick" – 5:06
5. "Painiac (Nothing Touches Me)" – 6:07
6. "Shell" – 3:26
7. "Analgesia" – 5:26
8. "Volcano" – 5:09
9. "Hot Hole" – 4:52
10. "Transceration" – 2:52

All tracks written by Raymond Watts, except track 6 written by Raymond Watts and Karl Hyde.

== Personnel ==
- Raymond Watts
- Steve White – guitar
- Hisashi Imai – guitar (7)
- Karl Hyde – guitar (6)
- Carol Anne Reynolds – backing vocals (4)
- Anna Wildsmith – additional words
