= Schaft =

Japanese industrial rock group

- Origin: Japan
- Genres: Electro-industrial, industrial rock
- Years active: 1991–1999, 2015-present
- Label: Victor Entertainment
- Members: Maki Fujii; Hisashi Imai
- Website: schaft2016.com

Schaft is a Japanese musical side project whose main members are Maki Fujii (of minus(ー), formerly of Soft Ballet) and Hisashi Imai (of Buck-Tick). Schaft can be thought of as being a supergroup in that, for the release of their debut album Switchblade, Maki and Imai formed the core of the group and a rotating roster of collaborators, who are well known within their genres, were brought in to work on various songs. Raymond Watts of PIG was Schaft's most recurring collaborator, having contributed to half the songs on their debut album and toured with the band. After a long hiatus, Schaft resumed activities in 2015.

== History ==
Maki and Imai originally formed Schaft in 1991 to record and release the song "Nicht-Titel" (German for "Non-Title") on the album Dance 2 Noise 001, a compilation album of various Japanese electronic and industrial acts. A live concert event was held on December 16 of the same year for the purpose of promoting the Dance 2 Noise 001 compilation and Schaft made their live debut, playing "Nicht-Titel" and at least one other song (though the exact setlist is unknown).

Schaft would remain dormant from then until 1994, when Imai's band Buck-Tick and Maki's band Soft Ballet toured together, giving the duo the opportunity to occasionally perform sets under the name Schaft., however the urge to reform Schaft must have come to the duo long before their live reunion, as only a month later they released their first full album of all new material.

For their debut album, Switchblade, Imai and Maki enlisted the help of several collaborators including members of Coil, Autechre and Meat Beat Manifesto but the most prominent collaborator was Raymond Watts who contributed to about half the material on the album and eventually went on a short tour with the group. The short support tour ran for five dates around Japan, one of which was filmed and later released to home video as Switchblade – Visual Mix. As can be seen in the video footage, these concerts would start with only Imai and Maki taking the stage, playing guitars and electronics respectively, with prerecorded vocals playing when necessary. Watts and drummer Motokatsu of The Mad Capsule Markets would join them on stage only a few songs into the setlist. A handful of the songs played live are alternate versions of what was released on Switchblade and were never made available outside of the live video. One exception to this would be a version of "Cold Light" which was used live and later found find a home of the Schaft remix EP, Switch.

Despite the project being popular in Japan, there were few further developments from Schaft after 1994. A promotional 12 inch Visual Cortex single was released in a limited run of 200 in 1995 consisting entirely of previously released material, after which point the band fell silent for several years.

Years later in 1999, Schaft remixed one of Zilch's songs for their album Bastard Eyes and the duo of Imai and Maki made guest appearances on Zilch's "Cut Your Edge Tour 99" on three separate dates. However, while they were introduced to the audience as Schaft, they played alongside Zilch as guest musicians and did not play their own songs.

In 2001 Imai and Watts joined with Atsushi Sakurai and Sascha Konietzko to form the band Schwein, a somewhat spiritual successor to Schaft. Even further in the future, in 2006, the Hellsing OVA series used the Schaft song "Broken English" in a promotional trailer and, eventually went on to use the song within the show itself in OVA V.

On October 3, 2015, Schaft announced their reunion, together with dates for the oncoming TOUR ULTRA –The Loud Engine–.

== Discography ==
=== Studio albums ===
- Switchblade (1994)
- Ultra (2016)

=== EPs ===
- Switch (1994)
- Visual Cortex (1995), promo EP
- Deeper and Down (2016)
- Hellsing OVA 7 (2009)

=== Videos ===
- Switchblade – Visual Mix (1994)
- Archives 2016 Tour Ultra – The Loud Engine (2016)

=== Box-set ===
- Archives (2016)
  - CD1: Switchblade
  - CD2: Switchremix + Works
  - CD3: One Hour Overdrive
  - DVD: Switchblade -Visual Mix-
  - CD: Hellsing Ultimate Collector's Edition

=== Miscellaneous appearances ===
- Contribution of original track "Nicht-Titel" on the compilation Dance 2 Noise 001 (1991)
- Contribution of a remix on the Zilch album, Bastard Eyes (1999)
