= Switchblade (album) =

Studio album by Schaft
- Released: 21 September 1994
- Recorded: Victor Aoyama Studio, Inning Recording Hostler, Master Rock Studios (UK), Ranch Apocalypse (UK), Matrix Recording Studio (UK), Livingston Studios (UK)
- Genre: Industrial
- Length: 77:58
- Label: Victor Entertainment
- Producer: Maki Fujii, Hisashi Imai, Raymond Watts

Schaft chronology
Switchblade (1994)	Switch (1994)

Switchblade is the debut album by Schaft, released in 1994. A promotional video for the song "Arbor Vitate" was filmed, and was later re-used by PIG for their version of the song.

== Track listing ==
No.	Title	Lyrics	Music	Mixed by	Length
1.	"Olive"	Maki Fujii	Fujii	Coil, Danny Hyde	5:04
2.	"The HEROINside"	Hisashi Imai, Raymond Watts	Imai, Watts	John Fryer	4:01
3.	"Thirsty Fly"	Watts	Watts	Watts	6:27
4.	"SKF10047"	instrumental	Fujii	Autechre	7:35
5.	"Nothing"	Watts	Imai, Watts	Watts	5:11
6.	"Slice"	Watts	Imai, Watts	Watts	7:50
7.	"Broken English"	Marianne Faithfull, Barry Reynolds, Joe Mavety, Steve York, Terry Stannard	Faithful, Reynolds, Mavety, York, Stannard	Fryer	6:33
8.	"Merry Christmas on Mars"	instrumental	Imai	Sugar J	6:32
9.	"inFORMation"	Jonny Stephens	Fujii, Stephens	Meat Beat Manifesto	4:24
10.	"Visual Cortex"	Susanne Bramson	Fujii, Imai	Coil, Danny Hyde	8:03
11.	"Fetid Air"	Watts	Watts	Watts	6:04
12.	"Arbor Vitate"	Watts	Fujii, Watts, CRA¥	Fryer	4:59
13.	"Cold Light"	Watts	Fujii, Imai, Watts	Keith LeBlanc	5:15

== Personnel ==
- Maki Fujii – electronic devices, computer programming, acoustic piano, noises
- Hisashi Imai – guitars, noises, vocals (2)
- Raymond Watts – computer programming, guitars, noises, vocals (2–3, 5–6, 11–13)

=== Additional personnel ===
- Susanne Bramson – vocals (10)
- Julianne Regan – vocals (7)
- Jonny Stephens (Meat Beat Manifesto) – vocals (9)
- Lynne Hobday – spoken word (1)
- Steve White – guitars (5)
- CRA¥ (The Mad Capsule Market's) – bass (12)
- Morota Koh (Doom) – bass (9)
- Keith LeBlanc – drums (3, 11)
- Motokatsu (The Mad Capsule Market's) – drums (12)
- Seiichi Teratani – drums (2)
- DJ Peah – scratching (9)
- Kazutoshi Yokoyama – manipulation assisting (2, 6, 8)
- Michiru Ōshima – orchestral arrangement (7)

All tracks arranged by Schaft, except 1, 4, 7 (Fujii), 6 (Imai), 8 (Imai, Watts).

- The song "Broken English" on this album is a Marianne Faithfull cover, and is the music accompanying the original version of the first trailer of Hellsing Ultimate as shown at Anime Expo 2005. The track was later used in the series as an insert song for episode 5.
