= RESONANCE =

rESONANCE

Compilation album by haloblack
- Released: July 15, 1992
- Studio: Burning Chrome MPLS
- Genre: Industrial rock
- Length: 27:49

Haloblack chronology
HB2 (1992)	rESONANCE (1992)	Tension Filter (1994)

rESONANCE is a compilation album by haloblack, self-released on July 15, 1992. The album comprises a collection of demos that were recorded in 1992 with the intention of being part of the band's debut Tension Filter.

== Track listing ==
All tracks are written by Bryan Barton.

Side one
No.	Title	Length
1.	"It's Bizarre"	4:20
2.	"Deep into the Holes of My Soul"	4:32
3.	"Get Your Balance"	3:42

Side two
No.	Title	Length
1.	"Taken Over"	3:18
2.	"What You Mean"	4:19
3.	"Nothing to Lose"	4:00
4.	"Everything Inside"	3:38

== Personnel ==
Adapted from the rESONANCE liner notes.

haloblack

- Bryan Barton (as Bryan Black) – vocals, instruments, production

== Release history ==
Region	Date	Label	Format	Catalog
United States	1992		CS	
United States	2011		DL	
