= Raw tension e.p. =

raw tension e.p.

EP by haloblack
- Released: August 23, 1995
- Length: 23:45
- Label: Fifth Colvmn

Haloblack chronology
| Tension Filter (1995) | raw tension e.p. (1995) | funkyhell (1996) |

Alternative cover
- CD cover

raw tension e.p. (stylized as >raw tension< e.p.) is an EP by haloblack, released on August 23, 1995, by Fifth Colvmn Records. It contains outtakes and remixes from the band's first two full-length Haloblack albums, Tension Filter and funkyhell. Intended to be pressed on compact disc in 1995 with its six songs contained in one continuous track, the EP was instead issued on cassette with an additional seventh track and the songs separated. On March 7, 2001, the CD-R version was released with original intended track listing intact on digital format.

== Track listing ==
All tracks are written by Bryan Barton.

Side one
| No. | Title | Length |
|---|---|---|
| 1. | "Hard End" (Seducto) | 3:45 |
| 2. | "No Way in Hell to Survive" | 3:22 |
| 3. | "No Chance Control Part 2" | 1:25 |

Side two
| No. | Title | Length |
|---|---|---|
| 1. | "Decay" (Clean) | 4:10 |
| 2. | "Balance" (Undesirable) | 4:25 |
| 3. | "Into The Tension Filter" | 3:38 |
| 4. | "Balance" (Deconstruct) | 3:00 |

CD track listing
| No. | Title | Length |
|---|---|---|
| 1. | "Seducto (Hard End)" | 4:17 |
| 2. | "Hack" | 2:28 |
| 3. | "Bored" (The Best Out of Me Mix) | 4:32 |
| 4. | "Blood Rich Heart" | 4:59 |
| 5. | "No Chance Control (Part 2)" | 1:23 |
| 6. | "Decay" (Clean) | 4:13 |
| 7. | "Balance" (Warzone) | 4:30 |
| 8. | "Balance" (Deconstruct) | 2:01 |
| 9. | "Fat09" | 3:40 |
| 10. | "Resonator" | 2:59 |
| 11. | "Rubber Alien" | 5:22 |

== Personnel ==
Adapted from the raw tension e.p. liner notes.

haloblack

- Bryan Barton (as Bryan Black) – vocals, instruments, production
- Bill Morrisette – production
- Damien Ray – instruments

Additional performers

- Joel Allard – guitar ("Blood Rich Heart")
- Jim Marcus – vocals ("No Chance Control (Part 2)")
- Jason McNinch – remixing ("Balance" (Warzone))
- Paul Robb – sampler ("Hack")

== Release history ==
| Region | Date | Label | Format | Catalog |
|---|---|---|---|---|
| United States | 1995 | Fifth Colvmn | CS | 9868–63182 |
| United States | 1999 | | DL | |
| United States | 2001 | | DL | |
