= A Stroll in the Pork =

Studio album by PIG
- Released: 1992
- Recorded: Tickle, London; Remaximum, London; Joe's Garage, London; Stricher Studios, Berlin; Studio Skalitz, Berlin; Utrecht
- Genre: Industrial
- Length: 29:22; 38:20 (US version); 47:23 (Japanese re-release)
- Label: Concrete/Contempo
- Producers: Raymond Watts, Jon Caffery

PIG chronology
Praise the Lard (1991)	A Stroll in the Pork (1992)	The Swining (1993)

Japanese reissue

Professional ratings
Review scores
Source	Rating
AllMusic	3/5 stars

A Stroll in the Pork is a 1992 EP released by Raymond Watts (as PIG), originally released in the United States by Concrete Records and in the United Kingdom by Contempo Records. It was re-released in 1998 in Japan by Blue Noise Records.

== Track listing ==
=== UK version ===
1. "Death Rattle 'n' Roll" (Raymond Watts) – 4:56
2. "Hello Hooray (Extra Large)" (Rolf Kemp) – 4:34
3. "Sondero Luminoso" (R. Watts) – 5:05
4. "Gravy Train (Revisited)" (R. Watts) – 3:45
5. "Watts" (R. Watts, Michael Watts) – 5:45
6. "Hello Hooray (Regular)" – 5:12

=== US version ===
1. "Hello Hooray (Extra Large)" – 4:36
2. "Death Rattle 'n' Roll" – 4:56
3. "High Protein" (R. Watts, Anna Wildsmith) – 4:50
4. "Gravy Train (Revisited)" – 3:40
5. "Sondero Luminoso" – 5:06
6. "Sick City (Live)" (R. Watts) – 4:17
7. "Watts" – 5:44
8. "Hello Hooray (Regular)" – 5:11

=== Japanese re-release ===
1. "Death Rattle 'n' Roll" – 4:56
2. "Gravy Train (Revisited)" – 3:41
3. "Sondero Luminoso" – 5:08
4. "Hello Hooray (Regular)" – 5:13
5. "Sick City (Live)" – 4:17
6. "Infinite Power" (R. Watts) – 4:07
7. "Watts" – 5:46
8. "Veterano" (R. Watts) – 4:47
9. "High Protein" – 4:51
10. "Hello Hooray (Extra Large)" – 4:35

== Personnel ==
- Raymond Watts
- Michael Watts – keyboards ("Hello Hooray", "Watts")
- Steve Crittel – guitars ("Hello Hooray", "Death Rattle 'n' Roll", "Sick City")
- Kevin Bass – drums ("Sick City")
- Jim McKechnie – samplers ("Sick City")
