= Sin Sex & Salvation =

EP by KMFDM, Pig
- Released: 1 December 1994
- Recorded: Hole In The Wall Studio, Studio X, Seattle; Ranch Apocalypse Studio, London
- Genre: Industrial
- Length: 22:57
- Label: Wax Trax! Records/TVT Records
- Producer: Raymond Watts, Svet Am

KMFDM vs... chronology
Sin Sex & Salvation (1994)	Skold vs. KMFDM (2009)

Pig chronology
Red Raw & Sore (1994)	Sin Sex & Salvation (1994)	Painiac (1995)

Sin Sex & Salvation (1994), is an EP released by KMFDM and Raymond Watts (as PIG). The artist for it is usually listed as KMFDM vs. PIG. It was re-released in 2024. Prior to then, none of the songs had ever been re-released in any other format since its initial 1994 release, except for "Fuck Me" which appears on a bonus disc entitled 'The Year of the Pig Collection' accompanying the Canadian release of the "Juke Joint Jezebel" Giorgio Moroder mixes maxi-single, and "Secret Skin" which appears on the 'Year of the Pig' 12" four song vinyl pressing containing "Juke Joint Jezebel" as the caveat. Both were released in 1995 and are out of print as well.

== Track listing ==
All tracks are written by Raymond Watts, Sascha Konietzko and Svet Am.

Wax Trax!/TVT release (TVT 8723-2)
No.	Title	Length
1.	"Secret Skin"	3:39
2.	"Fuck Me"	3:50
3.	"Rape Robbery & Violence"	5:43
4.	"Fuck Me Hoghunter"	4:10
5.	"Secret Sin (Sex & Salvation)"	5:35
Total length:		22:57

Available only on the Japanese Polystar release (PSCW-5305)
No.	Title	Length
6.	"Rape Robbery & Violence (The Hard Pork Mix)"	4:58
Total length:		27:55

Armalyte Industries 2024 Deluxe re-release (ARMCD094 / PIG014)
No.	Title	Length
1.	"Secret Skin"	3:42
2.	"Fuck Me"	4:35
3.	"Rape Robbery & Violence"	5:51
4.	"Fuck Me Hoghunter"	4:19
5.	"Secret Sin (Sex & Salvation)"	5:34
6.	"Brute (PIG Version)"	4:42
7.	"Disobedience (PIG Version)"	5:32
8.	"Secret Skin (PIG Version)"	4:49
9.	"Rape Robbery & Violence (The Hard Pork Mix)"	4:18
10.	"Secret Skin (Extended PIG Version)"	6:01
Total length:		49:23

== Personnel ==
- PIG:
  - Raymond Watts - vocals, programming
- KMFDM:
  - Sascha Konietzko - vocals, bass, synths, programming, mixing
  - Svet Am (Günter Schulz) - guitars
  - Jennifer Ginsberg - vocals (3, 6)
