= Yukihiro =

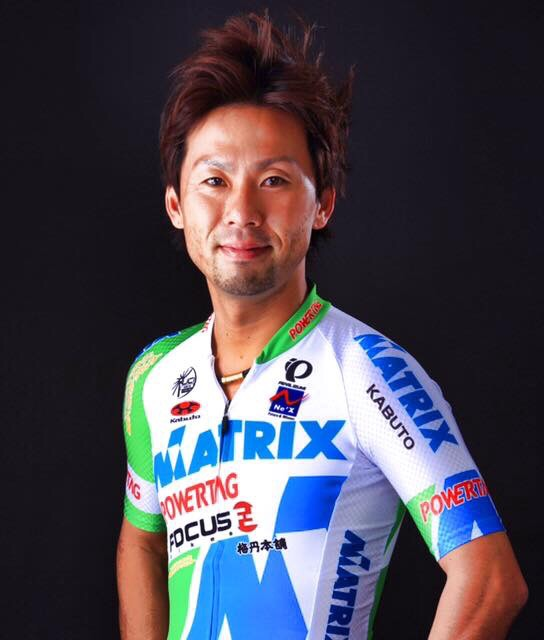
- Yukihiro Doi, Japanese cyclist
- Pronunciation: jɯkʲiçiɾo (IPA)
- Gender: Male

Origin
- Origin: Japanese
- Meaning: Different meanings depending on the kanji used

Yukihiro is a masculine Japanese given name.

== Written forms ==
Yukihiro can be written using different combinations of kanji characters. Here are some examples:

- 幸弘, "happiness, vast"
- 幸宏, "happiness, wide"
- 幸浩, "happiness, wide"
- 幸博, "happiness, doctor"
- 幸広, "happiness, wide"
- 幸寛, "happiness, generosity"
- 幸大, "happiness, big"
- 幸裕, "happiness, abundant"
- 幸洋, "happiness, ocean"
- 行弘, "to go, vast"
- 行宏, "to go, wide"
- 行浩, "to go, wide"
- 行博, "to go, doctor"
- 行広, "to go, wide"
- 行寛, "to go, generosity"
- 行裕, "to go, abundant"
- 行洋, "to go, ocean"
- 之弘, "of, vast"
- 之博, "of, doctor"
- 之裕, "of, abundant"
- 之洋, "of, ocean"
- 志弘, "determination, vast"
- 志博, "determination, doctor"
- 雪弘, "snow, vast"
- 雪広, "snow, wide"
- 雪洋, "snow, ocean"
- 恭博, "respectful, doctor"

The name can also be written in hiragana ゆきひろ or katakana ユキヒロ.

== Notable people with the name ==
- Yukihiro Doi (土井 雪広, born 1983), Japanese cyclist
- Yukihiro Fujimura (藤村 幸宏; born 1960), Japanese musician better known as "Chachamaru"
- Yukihiro (musician) (born 1968), musician
- Yukihiro Matsumoto (松本 行弘; born 1965), Japanese chief designer of the Ruby programming language
- Yukihiro Matsushita (松下 幸広; born 1973), Japanese swimmer
- Yukihiro Nozuyama (野津山 幸宏; born 1996), Japanese voice actor
- Yukihiro Ozaki (尾崎 幸洋; born 1949), Japanese scientist
- Yukihiro Takahashi (高橋 幸宏; 1952–2023), Japanese musician
- Yukihiro Takiguchi (滝口 幸広; 1985–2019), Japanese actor
- Yukihiro Torikai (鳥飼 行博; born 1959), Japanese economist and writer
- Yukihiro Yamase (山瀬 幸宏; born 1984), Japanese professional football player
