= No One Gets Out of Her Alive =

No One Gets Out Of Her Alive

EP by PIG
- Released: January 21, 1998
- Recorded: Ranch Apocalypse, London
- Genre: Industrial
- Length: 43:17
- Label: Victor Entertainment
- Producer: Raymond Watts

PIG chronology
Prime Evil (1997)	No One Gets Out Of Her Alive (1998)	Disrupt Degrade & Devastate (1999)

Professional ratings
Review scores
Source	Rating
Allmusic	4/5 stars

No One Gets Out of Her Alive is a 1998 EP by PIG.

== Track listing ==
1. "No One Gets Out of Her Alive" (Raymond Watts, Steve White) – 5:53
2. "Jump the Gun" (R. Watts, White) – 5:14
3. "Contempt" (R. Watts, White) – 4:31
4. "Satanic Panic" (R. Watts, White) – 7:04
5. "The Murder Car" (R. Watts, Michael Watts) – 4:49
6. "No One Gets Out of Her Alive (KMFDM Remix)" – 5:21
7. "Contempt (Sniper Remix)" – 5:33
8. "Find It, Fuck It, Forget It (Sump Mix)" – 4:43

== Personnel ==
- Raymond Watts
- Steve White
- Atsushi Sakurai – additional vocals (1, 7)
- Hisashi Imai – additional guitars (1)
- Carol Ann Reynolds – additional vocals (1–3, 6)
