= Pig (musical project) =

British musician

PIG
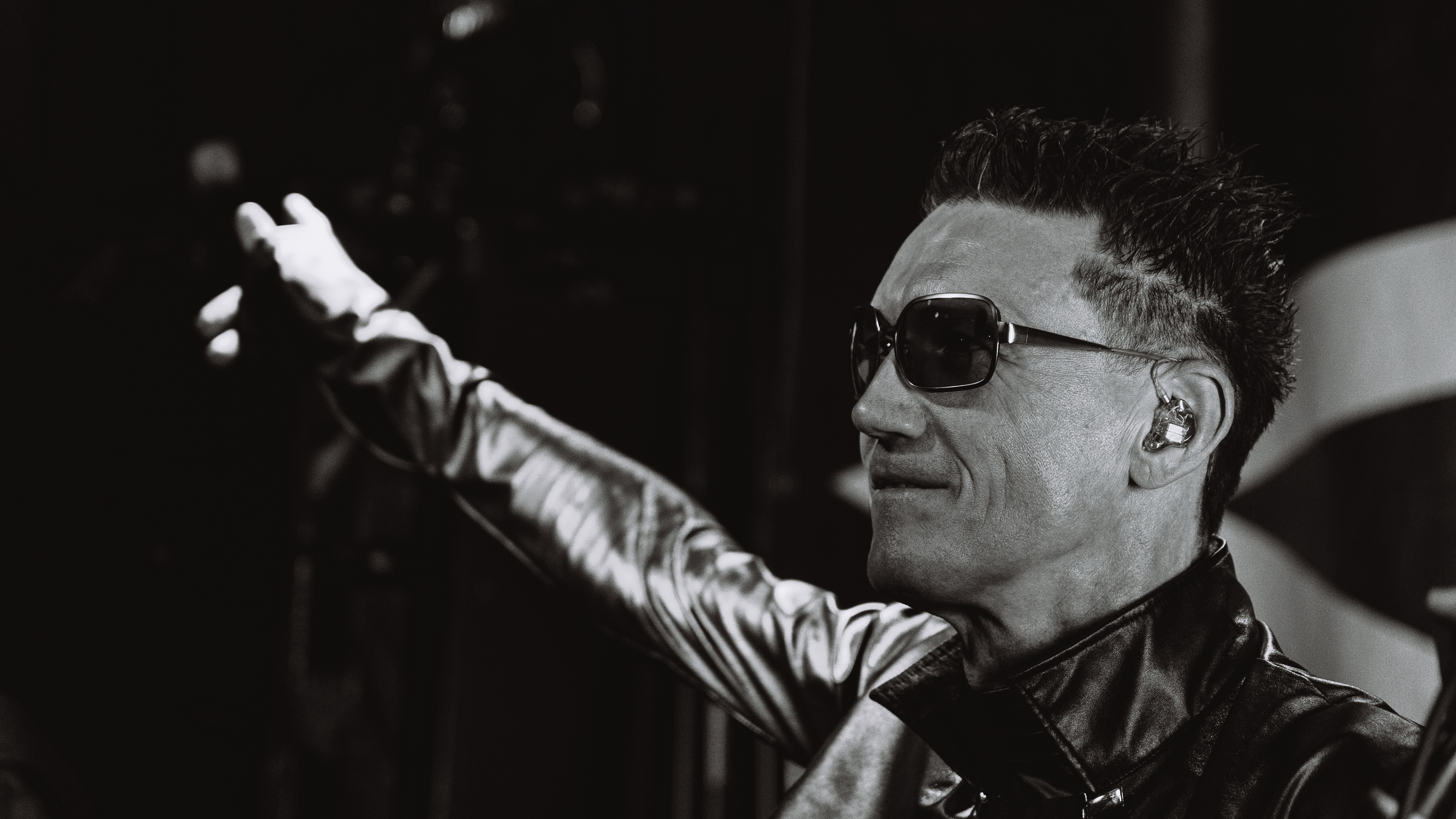
- PIG at Bowery Electric 2024

Background information
- Born: 1 September 1961 (age 65)
- Origin: London, England
- Genre: Industrial rock
- Occupations: Musician, sound engineer, producer
- Years active: Artist: 1980–present; Band: 1987–2003, 2005–2010, 2013–present
- Labels: Armalyte Industries; Metropolis; Wax Trax!; TVT; Nothing; Blue Noise; Grand; Cleopatra; Invisible; Alfa; Concrete; Contempo; Invitation; Victor Entertainment; Rock; I, Absentee
- Website: pigindustries.com

Raymond Watts (also known by his former stage names Nainz, Nainz Watts and Ray Scaballero) is an English musician, the founding and sole member of the industrial music project PIG, sometimes written as <PIG>.

Watts was a founding member and periodic collaborator of KMFDM, and has been a visible part of the industrial music scene since the early 1980s. He has toured with KMFDM, Nine Inch Nails, Schaft, Schwein, and Einstürzende Neubauten.

== History ==
=== Recent activity (2010–present) ===
Watts, Dr. Shinto and John Gosling released a four-song EP titled Mellan Rummen on 15 November 2010 on Amazon.com.

On 8 June 2012, Marc Heal revealed a demo version of "the first new PIG track in eight years" titled "Drugzilla (Rough As A Hog's Arse Mix)" via Cubanate's Official Facebook page and providing their followers a link to his personal SoundCloud page. The link was reposted by Watts a few hours later. A second demo titled "Shake" was released on 15 July 2012; again via Heal's SoundCloud page, this time also noting Dan Abela as engineer. In November 2014, Watts approved mixes for an upcoming joint-release EP.

In March 2015, another collaborative EP was announced with Primitive Race titled Long in the Tooth with a worldwide release date of 5 June 2015 through Metropolis Records. Later that month in an interview, Watts revealed a new PIG album has been written and recorded. Former KMFDM bandmate En Esch will be providing final touches to the album.

On 15 June 2016, the official PIG Facebook page announced that the new PIG album titled The Gospel would be released on 9 September 2016 on Metropolis. Soon after. tour dates were announced The American Excess tour with opening bands En Esch & Peter Turns Pirate. The North American tour takes place in September and October 2016. A remix album, Swine & Punishment, was released in 2017.

In 2018, PIG released the album Risen, supported by another North American tour. 2019 saw the release of a collection of cover songs on an LP titled Candy. The release of Candy was followed in the fall of the same year by the Divine Descent North American Tour, supported by Cyanotic and A Primitive Evolution. The Divine Descent Tour concluded on 6 October 2019 in Minneapolis, Minnesota. A brief tour of the United Kingdom followed.

In 2020, PIG released a compilation album, Pain Is God, which featured some new tracks and included songs from prior tour EPs dating back to the previous year. The album was released digitally, and on CD and vinyl, including special edition packages with unique 3D features in the digipack or record sleeve.

In 2022, PIG released the album The Merciless Light. In 2023, a remixed and remastered version of Candy titled Candy (Rewrapped) was released.

In 2024, PIG released the album Red Room, featuring Alexis Mincolla of the band 3TEETH on the song Crumbs Chaos & Lies. Also in 2024, PIG released the EP Feast of Agony.

On 30 January 2025, the music video for the song Everything off of the 1996 album Wrecked was uploaded to the PIG YouTube channel, in conjunction with the announcement that a remastered version of the album, containing all of the tracks featured on both the Japanese and U.S. versions of the album, would be released on March 7. This directly follows the 2023 remaster of The Swining/Red Raw & Sore and the 2024 remaster of Sinsation.

November 14, 2025 marked the release of a remix album of tracks from 2022's The Merciless Light titled The Merciful Night. On February 11, 2026 Watts announced the album Hurt People Hurt set. The first single off the album, Tosca's Kiss, was released on March 6 and the album was released on May 22. Shortly thereafter, on July 31, PIG announced a new EP titled Dirt Box, releasing the single "An American Ideal of Beauty" on the same day. The EP, comprising four original songs and four remixes of these songs done by Cyanotic, Stabbing Westward, Combichrist, and Rabbit Junk, was released on September 4, 2026.

== Musical style ==
PIG tends to sound more orchestral than KMFDM, with darker, more complex, more ambient beats. His album and song titles tend to be witty, rife with alliteration ("Prayer Praise & Profit") or are plays on the titles of popular works or phrases (The Swining / "Symphony for the Devil"). He also manages to work food, heroin or pork related terms into his albums. Like KMFDM, humor features prominently in PIG's lyrics, although they tend towards a darker/grittier tone than KMFDM's.

== Collaboration with KMFDM ==
Raymond Watts is a founding member of KMFDM, and has collaborated with them on several projects both under his own name and his <PIG> band moniker. Watts has contributed his skills as a songwriter and vocalist to several KMFDM albums, including their first album Opium in 1984, and has a heavy presence on their 1995 album Nihil, which spawned the hit "Juke Joint Jezebel". A collaborative EP titled Sin Sex & Salvation was released in 1994 under the moniker "PIG vs. KMFDM". Several musicians have performed with both bands, including keyboardist/percussionist En Esch, and guitarists Steve White, Jules Hodgson, and Günter Schulz, and drummer Andy Selway. Watts has performed with KMFDM as part of the touring lineup, with the concerts billed as "KMFDM featuring PIG". The setlists for those shows feature KMFDM songs alongside Pig songs. A live CD from the 2002 "Sturm & Drang" tour was released on Metropolis Records that same year.

Watts was given a tongue-in-cheek description in the lyrics to the KMFDM song "Intro" from the 2003 album WWIII:

The Lord of Lard, the Mighty Swine
He loves Manchego and a bottle of wine
Also known as Raymond Watts,
He screams out his lungs while his brain slowly rots!

In 2024, a deluxe edition of Sin Sex & Salvation was released.

== Other collaborations ==
Watts has worked with several industrial and avant-garde artists, receiving credits as PIG and Raymond Watts interchangeably. He has also been credited as "Nainz Watts" or "Nains Watts" on several early releases.

- From 1984 to 1986 Watts was sound engineer for Mona Mur.
- From 1985 to 1989 Watts was a sound engineer for Einstürzende Neubauten.
- Watts has occasionally collaborated with J. G. Thirlwell, briefly playing bass in Foetus Corruptus and co-writing songs for Steroid Maximus on the album Gondwanaland. Thirlwell, in turn, has cowritten and remixed songs for PIG.
- Watts recorded music for ex-girlfriend spoken-word artist Sow (born Anna Wildsmith)'s 1994 album Je M'Aime and again for her 1998 album Sick and 2010 album Dog. "Je M'aime" was reissued under the name "Pig/Sow" in 1999.
- PIG's 1995 album Sinsation was released in the US on Trent Reznor's label Nothing Records. PIG also toured with Reznor's band Nine Inch Nails in the UK.
- Japanese-based band Schaft employed Watts as a lyricist/vocalist for the 1994 album Switchblade and companion remix collection Switch.
- In 2001, Watts and KMFDM frontman Sascha Konietzko teamed up with Japanese musicians Atsushi Sakurai (Buck-Tick) and Hisashi Imai (Schaft and Buck-Tick) to form the project super group Schwein. Schwein released two albums Schweinstein and Son of Schweinstein; the latter being remixes from the first.
- Watts has also provided production, mixing, remixing, and/or vocals for Psychic TV, Chemlab, Haloblack, 2-Kut, Hoodlum Priest, Steroid Maximus, H3llb3nt, The Hit Parade, Brain Drive, Buck-Tick, D.I.E., Atsushi Sakurai, Sprung aus den Wolken, The Megaton Men, Mortiis, Judda], Tweaker, Prong, West End and Zos Kia.
- Watts contributed an original composition to the soundtrack of the computer game MDK2. It plays on the title screen and one of Max's levels.
- Watts contributed to the soundtrack of Alexander McQueen's final runway show, Plato's Atlantis (Spring/Summer 2010).
- Watts has contributed vocals to the track "Second Coming" by Team Cybergeist
- In 2020 Watts became a member of industrial supergroup The Joy Thieves by contributing vocals to "Empty Spaces", a song the band recorded for Riveting Music's Tear Down the Walls: A Riveting Tribute to Pink Floyd's The Wall.

== Solo band members ==
=== Current members ===
- Raymond Watts – vocals, keyboards, programming, guitars (1987–present)
- En Esch – vocals, rhythm guitar, keyboards, programming (2016–present)
- Dave McAnally – lead guitar (2026–present)
- Michael J. Carrasquillo – drums (2026–present)
- Mykill Hrunka – keyboards (2026–present)

=== Former members ===
- Steve Crittel – live guitars (1991–1992)
- Jim McKenchnie – live keyboards (1991–1992)
- Kevin Bass – live drums (1991–1992)
- Michael Watts – keyboards, organ, vocals (1991–1993, 1998–2006, 2016–2019)
- Steve White – lead guitar, programming (1993–2007, 2018–2026)
- Karl Hyde – lead guitar (1993–1994)
- Santos De Castro – drums (1993, 1994, 1996)
- Imai Hisashi – lead guitar, noises (1994–1998)
- Olivier Grasset – drums, percussion, programming, production (1994, 2002, 2010)
- Joanna Peacock – bass (1994)
- Günter Schulz – lead guitar, programming (1994–1999, 2006, 2016–2017, 2019–2020)
- Jules Hodgson – lead guitar, bass, keyboards (1997–2006)
- Andy Selway – drums (1997–2006)
- Jason Knotek – live lead guitar (2006)
- Angel Bartolotta – live drums (2006)
- Mark Gemini Thwaite – lead guitar, bass, synthesizers, programming (2015–2017)
- Gregory "Z. Marr" Steward – keyboards, programming, additional guitars (2016–2018)
- Eric Gottesman – live keyboards (2016–2017)
- Luke Dangler – live lead guitar (2017)
- Ben Christo – lead guitar (2018–2019)
- Martin Eden – guitars, bass, keyboards, programming (2004–2010, 2016–2019)
- Jan-Vincent Velazco – drums (2018–2019, 2022–present)
- Galen Waling – drums (2016–2018, 2019–2024)
- Bradley Bills – drums (2024–2026)

=== Guest members ===
- Alex Hacke – guitars (1988)
- Nikkolai Weidemann – guitars, piano, saxophone (1988)
- Axel Dill – drums, piano, mixing (1988)
- Achim Mennicken – guitars (1988–1989; died 2014)
- Uwe Wüst – guitars (1988)
- Remo Park – guitars (1988)
- Christian Graupner – percussion, programming (1988–1989)
- J.G. Thirlwell – production (1988–1992)
- John Caffery – production, recording (1989–1991)
- Roli Mosimann – mixing (1989)
- Martin Hawkes – recording, mixing (1991)
- Paul Kendall – mixing (1991)
- Siewert Johannsen – engineering (1992)
- Anna Wildsmith – vocals (1989–1992, 1995–1996, 1998–1999, 2003–2006, 2010; died 2016)
- John Gosling – programming, engineering, mixing (1993, 2010, 2018)
- Enrico Thomaso – flugelhorn (1993–1994)
- Sascha Konietzko – vocals, synthesizers, production, engineering, mixing, programming (1994, 1997, 1998, 2020)
- Jennifer Ginsberg – vocals (1994)
- Julian Beeston – programming, mixing (1995–1997)
- Carol Anne Reynolds – vocals (1995, 1997–1999)
- Sakurai Atsushi – vocals (1997–1998)
- Chris Shepard – (1997–1998)
- Giles Littlefield – production, noises, programming (1996–1997)
- Rob Henry – programming (1996–1999, 2018)
- Jennie Bellestar – vocals (1996–1997)
- Ruth McArdle – vocals (1996–1997)
- Lian Warmington – vocals (1996–1997)
- James Reynolds – engineering (1996–1997)
- Ben Drakeford – engineering (1996–1997)
- Jo Maskell – vocals (1997)
- Andrew Bennett – guitars (1999)
- Lisa Millet – vocals (1999)
- Andy Cooke – programming (1999)
- Arianne Schreiber – vocals (2001–2006)
- Bryan Black – vocals, production, mixing (2001–2006)
- Marc Heal – vocals, keyboards, programming (2004–2006, 2015–2019)
- Dan Abela – guitars, engineering (2015–2016)
- Nathan Cavaleri – guitars (2010, 2016)
- Tim Skold – vocals, keyboards, guitars, programming, production (2018)
- Anita Sylph – vocals (2018)
- Joshua Broughton – guitars (2018)
- Emre Ramazanoglu – keyboards, programming (2018)
- Phil Barry – guitars (2018)
- Ben Lee – violin (2018)
- Sasha Grey – vocals (2018–2019)
- Michelle Martinez – vocals (2018–2019)
- Susannah Doyle – vocals (2018)

== Discography (partial) ==
Several of Watts' albums were originally released in Japan, where he enjoyed considerably more success than in the United States and United Kingdom, though some of those albums were eventually released in the US.

In 2004, he signed to Grand Recordings for distribution in the UK, under the name "Watts". The All Hamerican Pig Show was released in 2011 as a DVD via the Pig website, featuring performances from Pig's 2006 U.S. tour and a complete live performance from Osaka, Japan, 1999. The DVD also included the music videos for Painiac and Everything.

=== Studio albums ===
- A Poke in the Eye... with a Sharp Stick (1988)
- Praise the Lard (1991)
- The Swining (1993) – Japan only release; reissued in 1999 in the US as The Swining/Red Raw & Sore
- Sinsation (1995) – US release in 1996
- Wrecked (1996) – Japanese release; US release in 1997 has somewhat different track listing
- Genuine American Monster (1999) – US release in 2002
- Pigmartyr (2004) – UK only release, using the "Watts" name, although it was re-released in 2005 as Pigmata under the "PIG" moniker
- The Gospel (2016) – co-written and co-produced by Z. Marr
- Risen (2018)
- Candy (2019) – album of covers
- Pain Is God (2020)
- The Merciless Light (2022)
- Red Room (2024)
- Hurt People Hurt (2026)

=== Remix albums ===
- Swine & Punishment (2017) – remixes of songs from The Gospel
- Stripped & Whipped (2019) – remixes of songs from Risen
- Pain Killer (2021) – remixes of songs from Pain is God
- The Merciful Night (2025) – remixes of songs from The Merciless Light

=== EPs ===
- Hello Hooray (1992)
- A Stroll in the Pork (1992)
- Sin Sex & Salvation (as PIG vs KMFDM) (1994) – collaborative EP with KMFDM
- Red Raw & Sore (1994) – Japan only release; reissued in 1999 in America on The Swining/Red Raw & Sore (1999)
- Painiac (1995) – Japan only release
- Prime Evil (1997) – Japan only release
- No One Gets Out of Her Alive (1998) – Japan only release
- Disrupt Degrade & Devastate (1999) – Japan only release
- Compound Eye Sessions (2015) – with Marc Heal
- Long in the Tooth (2015) – with Primitive Race
- The Diamond Sinners (2016) – digital only release
- The Redeemer (2016) – tour only release
- Prey & Obey (2017) – digital only release
- Second Coming (2017) – tour only release
- Hell to Pay... in the USA (2018) – tour only release
- That's the Way (I Like It) (2018) – with Sasha Grey
- Mobocracy (2019) – tour only release
- The Wages of Sin (2019) – digital only release available only with purchase of Ultra Limited Edition "Hogtags"
- Sex & Death (2020) – digital only release
- Feast of Agony (2024) - physical copies exclusive to tour, otherwise digital only release
- Dirt Box (2026)

=== Singles ===
- "Never For Fun" (1988)
- "Sick City" / "Shit for Brains" (1989)
- "Shit for Brains" – Germany-only release
- "The Fountain of Miracles" (1993)
- "Black Mass" (2018)- (Free Digital only album of Christmas Covers)
- "Seed of Evil" (2019) – with Black Needle Noise

=== Video releases ===
- The All Hamerican Pig Show (2011)

=== Book releases ===
- PIG - The Word of the Lard: The Scripture of Raymond Watts (2017) – book compiling all of Raymond Watts' lyrics to date

== Music videos ==
Several music videos have been filmed, but most remain unreleased outside Japan. Most videos have surfaced online on YouTube in questionable quality. The video for Arbor Vitate is actually a re-cut version of the Schaft video of the same song.

- "Shit for Brains" (1988)
- "The Fountain of Miracles" (1993)
- "The Seven Veils" (1993)
- "Painiac" (1995)
- "Everything" (1996)
- "Arbor Vitate" (2004)
- "Long in the Tooth" (2015)
- "The Diamond Sinners" (2016)
- "Found in Filth" (2016)
- "Prey & Obey" (2017)
- "The Chosen Few" (2018)
- "The Revelation" (2018)
- "That's The Way (I Like It)" (2018)
- "Happy Xmas (War Is Over)" (2018)
- "You've Lost That Lovin' Feelin'" (2019)
- "Mobocracy" (2019)
- "Sex & Death" (2020)
- "Rock 'n' Roll Refugee" (2020)
- "Baptise Bless & Bleed" (2022)
- "The Dark Room" (2022)
- "Tarantula (Jim Davies Remix)" (2022)
- "Speak of Sin (Jim Davies Remix)" (2022)
- "Crumbs Chaos & Lies" (2024)
- "Dum Dum Bullet" (2024)
- "Fallout" (2024)
- "Tosca's Kiss" (2026)
- "SEX & SU1C1DE" (2026)
