= Tension Filter =

Studio album by haloblack
- Released: November 1, 1994
- Recorded: 1992 – 1994
- Studio: Various: Danger; (Minneapolis, Minnesota); Warzone; (Chicago, Illinois)
- Genre: Industrial rock
- Length: 42:53
- Label: Fifth Colvmn
- Producer: Bryan Barton; Bill Morrisette; Damien Ray; Van Christie; Carl White

Haloblack chronology
rESONANCE (1992)	Tension Filter (1994)	raw tension e.p. (1995)

Tension Filter (or stylized as >Tension Filter<) is the debut studio album by haloblack, released on November 1, 1994 by Fifth Colvmn Records.

== Reception ==
Professional ratings
Review scores
Source	Rating
AllMusic	3/5 stars

John Bush of AllMusic says "the group breathes life into somewhat tired industrial-rock, even though the requisite metal guitars, distortion and drum programming are nothing new." Last Sigh Magazine recommended the album for fans of Nine Inch Nails 1989 album Pretty Hate Machine and described it as "a great mix of synth and guitar work and is chockfull of electronic sound – perfect for the industrial/electronic scene." Sonic Boom agreed with the comparison for the "sheer depth, power, and stark originality" of the compositions and said "Bryan manages to bring a guitar into his music with a depth and a sound that only people like Trent Renzor can dream of."

== Track listing ==
All tracks are written by Bryan Barton.

No.	Title	Length
1.	"Decay"	3:04
2.	"Everything Inside"	3:29
3.	"Taken Over"	3:15
4.	"No Chance Control"	4:20
5.	"Deep into the Holes of My Soul"	4:20
6.	"Balance"	4:00
7.	"Nothing to Lose"	4:08
8.	"Surge"	2:20
9.	"It's Bizarre"	4:12
10.	"You Bleed Me"	3:40
11.	"Untitled"	6:03

== Personnel ==
Adapted from the Tension Filter liner notes.

haloblack

- Bryan Barton (as Bryan Black) – vocals, instruments, editing, production
- Bill Morrisette – production, guitar (1, 2, 3, 5, 8, 9)
- Damien Ray – instruments, production, additional programming (7)

Additional performers

- Malik – guitar (10)
- Krayge Tyler – guitar (4, 6, 7, 10)
- Jim Marcus – additional vocals (4)

Production and design

- Tom Baker – mastering
- Van Christie – production and engineering (4, 5, 6, 10)
- Steve "Mud" Krayson – editing
- Mary Lawing – cover art
- Jim Marcus – production
- Jason McNinch – engineering (4, 5, 6, 10)
- Jordan Nogood – design
- Sabrina A. Rahaman – photography
- Chis Satenger – editing
- Carl White – production, engineering and mixing (1, 2, 3, 7, 8, 9)

== Release history ==
Region	Date	Label	Format	Catalog
United States	1994	Fifth Colvmn	CD	9868-63182
