= Cobalt 60 (band) =

Belgian music group active from 1995 to 1999

- Origin: Belgium
- Genres: Industrial; Electronic body music
- Years active: 1995–1999
- Label: Facedown (Edel Music Subsidiary)
- Spinoff of: Front 242, Kriegbereit
- Past members: Jean-Luc de Meyer; Dominique Lallement; Robert Wilcocks

Cobalt 60 was an electro-industrial/EBM group featuring Jean-Luc de Meyer and Dominique Lallement. Cobalt 60 has also done music for the PC game Wing Commander: Prophecy (Wing Commander V).

== History ==
After 1993, as Front 242 entered a temporary lull in activity, de Meyer contributed vocals to various projects including Cyber-Tec Project, Crisis n.T.i., and Birmingham 6. It wasn't until joining with Lallement of French band Kreigbereit that de Meyer felt that he'd established a new full-time project. Initial reception was mixed, with many 242 fans expecting a reprise of de Meyer's former project. The band explicitly sought to create its own distinct sound, achieving it through fast tempos, stripped-down instrumentation, spontaneity, and even lyrics sung in French.

The duo signed to Facedown (an Edel Music subsidiary) in 1996 and released their first album, Elemental. Two singles from the album were produced — "If I Was" and "Born Again" — both produced by Marc Heal of Cubanate. In 1997 the band became engaged in video game soundtracks, providing a remix of the track "Crush" from Command & Conquer: Red Alert and tracks for the soundtrack to Wing Commander: Prophecy. That year they also brought their live guitarist, Robert Wilcocks, into the band as a formal member and producer.

== Discography ==
=== Studio albums ===
- Elemental (1996)
- Twelve (1998)

=== Singles ===
- "Crush" (1996)
- "Born Again" (The Cubanate Remixes) (1996)
- "Prophecy – Wing Commander V : Prophecy Theme Single" (1997)
- "Prophecy – The Clubmixes" (1997)
- "It" (1998)
- "If I Was" (1999)
