= Cut (C-Tec album) =

Studio album by C-Tec
- Released: 15 February 2000
- Recorded: December 1998 – April 1999
- Studio: Spike Studios (London, United Kingdom)
- Genre: EBM
- Length: 47:36
- Label: Synthetic Symphony
- Producer: Marc Heal; Doug Martin

C-Tec chronology
Darker (1997)	Cut (2000)	Darker/Cut (2018)

Cut is the second studio album by C-Tec, released on 15 February 2000 by Synthetic Symphony. The album was ranked #25 on the German Alternative Charts (DAC) Top 50 Albums of 2000. On 5 October 2018 the album was reissued as a music download with an additional track titled "Until We Disappear" and written by Marc Heal.

== Reception ==
Niklas Forsberg of Release Magazine awarded the album six out of ten, describing the music as "almost exclusively overdone in the sense that the aggressiveness became too dominant" and saying "the one thing making me give "Cut" a grade above average is due to the participation of veteran, almost cult declared artist Jean-Luc De Meyer." Regen said "In many ways, Cut is an improvement on Darker – the production is cleaner and has a more modern sheen" and "the palette of sound is more consistent, making it a more cohesive album." The critic went on to claim "it also feels like it plays it, if not safe, at least safer, leaning more toward traditional industrial sounds and beats... but a really solid version of those sounds."

== Track listing ==
All lyrics are written by Jean-Luc de Meyer

No.	Title	Music	Length
1.	"Brutal"	Jean-Luc de Meyer; Marc Heal	5:08
2.	"I Die Tomorrow"	de Meyer; Heal	5:13
3.	"Gesellschaft"	de Meyer; Heal; Doug Martin	5:23
4.	"She Left"	de Meyer; Heal	4:24
5.	"Stormtrigger"	de Meyer; Heal; Martin	4:42
6.	"Fighter"	de Meyer; Ged Denton	4:40
7.	"Cut... Lacerate"	de Meyer; Heal; Martin	7:57
8.	"Nightbreed"	Julian Beeston; de Meyer; Heal; Martin	4:00
9.	"Chosen"	de Meyer; Heal; Martin	6:08

Bonus track
No.	Title	Music	Length
10.	"She Left" (French Version)	Heal	4:22

2018 digital issue track
No.	Title	Music	Length
11.	"Until We Disappear"	Heal	5:47

== Personnel ==
Adapted from the Cut liner notes.

C-Tec

- Jean-Luc de Meyer – vocals
- Ged Denton – synthesizer
- Marc Heal – synthesizer, additional vocals, production

'Additional performers

- Julian Beeston – drums, additional synthesizer
- David Bianchi – guitar
- Doug Martin – synthesizer, additional guitar, engineering

Production and design

- Peter Anderson – photography
- Patrick Bird – mastering
- Greg Jakobek – design
- Jim Marcus – cover art (reissue)
- Jules Seifert – remastering (reissue)

== Release history ==
Region	Date	Label	Format	Catalog
Germany	2000	Synthetic Symphony	CD	SPV 085-62422
Russia	2003	Союз/Synthetic Symphony	CD	SPV 085-62422
United Kingdom	2018	Armalyte Industries	DL	
