= Darker/Cut =

Compilation album by C-Tec
- Released: 5 September 2018
- Recorded: 1997 – April 1999
- Studio: Spike Studios (London, United Kingdom)
- Genre: EBM
- Length: 111:54
- Label: Armalyte Industries
- Producer: Marc Heal; Doug Martin

C-Tec chronology
Cut (2000)	Darker/Cut (2018)

Darker/Cut is a compilation album by C-Tec, released on 5 September 2018 by Armalyte Industries.

== Reception ==
Flux awarded Darker/Cut a nine out of ten and said "every track has a story and a meaning, and we have no fillers or dull moments" and that the album represents "an important page in the history of electronic music, showing different facets and graced by great artists." Regen said Darker "has De Meyer's vocals, which are a hallmark of '80s era industrial, as well as Heal's own chainsaw of a voice, and blasts of heavily processed guitars" and "felt more experimental than the next album, Cut, which seems to shift musical styles more, as well as a greater employment of empty space throughout the album."

== Track listing ==
All lyrics are written by Jean-Luc de Meyer, except "Epitaph" written by Dorothy Parker.

Disc one: Darker
No.	Title	Music	Length
1.	"Random"	Jean-Luc de Meyer; Marc Heal	4:54
2.	"Flowing"	Rhys Fulber; de Meyer; Heal	8:42
3.	"Foetal"	de Meyer; Heal	5:46
4.	"Silent Voices"	de Meyer; Ged Denton	3:40
5.	"Being Nothing"	de Meyer; Denton; Heal	5:10
6.	"The Lost"	de Meyer; Heal	5:07
7.	"Stateless"	de Meyer; Heal	5:11
8.	"Shift IV"	de Meyer; Denton; Heal	3:55
9.	"Epitaph"	de Meyer; Heal	6:25
10.	"My Unbreakable Code"	Heal	4:02

Disc two: Cut
No.	Title	Music	Length
1.	"Brutal"	Jean-Luc de Meyer; Marc Heal	5:10
2.	"I Die Tomorrow"	de Meyer; Heal	5:14
3.	"Gesellschaft"	de Meyer; Heal; Doug Martin	5:55
4.	"She Left"	de Meyer; Heal	4:25
5.	"Stormtrigger"	de Meyer; Heal; Martin	4:52
6.	"Fighter"	de Meyer; Ged Denton	4:54
7.	"Cut... Lacerate"	de Meyer; Heal; Martin	8:04
8.	"Nightbreed"	Julian Beeston; de Meyer; Heal; Martin	4:03
9.	"Chosen"	de Meyer; Heal; Martin	6:13
10.	"She Left" (French Version)	Heal	4:24
11.	"Until We Disappear"	Heal	5:48

== Personnel ==
Adapted from the Darker/Cut liner notes.

Cyber-Tec Project

- Jean-Luc de Meyer – vocals
- Ged Denton – keyboards (1.1–1.10), synthesizer (2.1–2.10)
- Marc Heal – additional vocals, production, keyboards (1.1–1.10), synthesizer (2.1–2.10)

'Additional performers

- Phil Barry – sampler (1.1–1.10)
- Julian Beeston – drums and additional synthesizer (2.1–2.10)
- David Bianchi – guitar (2.1–2.10)
- Rhys Fulber – sampler and additional production (1.1–1.10)
- Björn Jünemann – sampler (1.1–1.10)
- Doug Martin – synthesizer, additional guitar and engineering (2.1–2.10)
- Daniel Myer – sampler (1.1–1.10)
- Dejan Samardzic – sampler (1.1–1.10)

Production and design

- Jim Marcus – cover art, design
- Jules Seifert – remastering

== Release history ==
Region	Date	Label	Format	Catalog
United Kingdom	2018	Armalyte Industries	CD	ARM 051
