= Cyber-Tec =

EP by Cyber-Tec Project
- Released: 1 August 1995
- Genre: Electro-industrial; EBM
- Length: 69:02
- Label: Synthetic Symphony

Cyber-Tec Project chronology
Cyber-Tec (1995)	Darker (1997)

Cyber-Tec is the debut EP of C-Tec, released on August 1, 1995, by Synthetic Symphony. The release peaked at No. 7 on the CMJ RPM Chart in the U.S.

== Reception ==
Larry Dean Miles of Black Monday recommended Cyber-Tec to techno listeners interested in dance but noted "all the songs sound alike, it gets very repetitive." Sonic Boom said "I think that while there are only really four distinct songs on this EP, they all do an excellent job of providing the listener with a wide inflection of vocals from slower lyrical style used in 'Human' to the more traditional EBM speed employed on "Cauterize"."

== Track listing ==
All music is composed by Ged Denton, Jean-Luc De Meyer and Jonathan Sharp.

No.	Title	Remixer(s)	Length
1.	"Let Your Body Die" (Original Mix)		4:57
2.	"Human" (Original Mix)		4:58
3.	"Cauterized" (K-Nitrate "EBM Mix")	K-Nitrate	6:49
4.	"Let Your Body Die" (Birmingham 6 "Convulsive dance Mix")	Birmingham 6	6:07
5.	"Radiance"		3:23
6.	"Let Your Body Die" (Cubanate W.F.T.A.Y. Mix)	Cubanate	6:33
7.	"Cauterized" (Original Mix)		4:43
8.	"Human" (Machine Manitou "Centrifuge Mix")	Machine Manitou	5:34
9.	"Let Your Body Die" (Television Overdose "Overdosed Mix")	Television Overdose	5:57
10.	"Let Your Body Die" (Maff Evans "In-Human Mix")	Maff Evans	6:42
11.	"Human" (Maff Evans "ANAR Trance Mix")	Maff Evans	8:02
12.	"Let Your Body Die" (K-Nitrate "Allied Forces Mix")	K-Nitrate	5:24

United States issue track listing
No.	Title	Remixer(s)	Length
1.	"Let Your Body Die" (Birmingham 6 Convulsive Dance Mix)	Birmingham 6	6:05
2.	"Human"		4:56
3.	"Cauterized" (K-Nitrate EBM Mix)	K-Nitrate	6:51
4.	"Let Your Body Die"		4:53
5.	"Radiance"		3:18
6.	"Let Your Body Die" (Cubanate W.F.T.A.Y. Mix)	Cubanate	6:33
7.	"Cauterized"		4:42
8.	"Human" (Machine Manitou Centerfuge Mix)	Machine Manitou	5:33
9.	"Let Your Body Die" (Television Overdose Overdosed Mix)	Television Overdose	6:29
10.	"Let Your Body Die" (K-Nitrate Body-Tech Mix USA Only)	K-Nitrate	6:07
11.	"Human" (Maff Evans ANAR Trance Mix)	Maff Evans	8:02
12.	"Let Your Body Die" (K-Nitrate Allied Forces Mix)	K-Nitrate	5:32

== Personnel ==
Adapted from the Cyber-Tec liner notes.

Cyber-Tec Project

- Ged Denton – instruments
- Jean-Luc De Meyer – vocals, instruments
- Jonathan Sharp – instruments

Production and design

- Keith Banks – mastering
- Zalman Fishman – executive-production
- Bruno Marcandella – cover art, design
- Paul Michael Green – photography

== Release history ==
Region	Date	Label	Format	Catalog
Europe	1995	Synthetic Symphony	CD	SPV 076–61112
United States	1995	Fifth Colvmn	CD	9868–63198
Poland	1995	SPV Poland	CS	SPV 61114
