= Scrash =

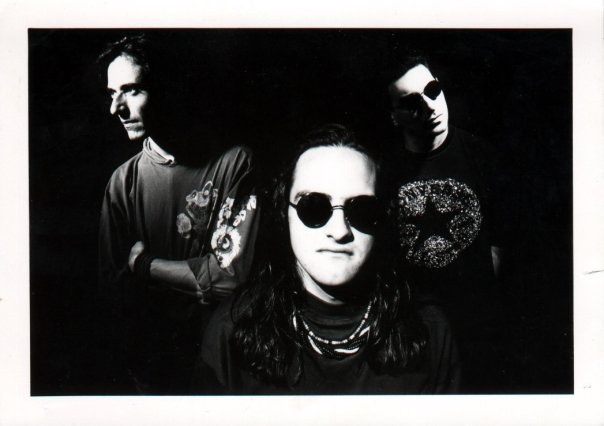
L-R: Mike Fox, Luke Sweeney, Darren Pataki

Scrash was a three-piece rock band from Stourbridge in the West Midlands, UK.

== History ==
They were active between 1991 and 1994, and performed music that was a fusion of indie, techno, metal and industrial.

Scrash toured the UK extensively during that period, playing many concerts alongside other luminaries of the then indie music scene, such as Pop Will Eat Itself, Meat Beat Manifesto, Senser, Terrorvision, Back to the Planet, Babylon Zoo, Gigolo Aunts, Scorpio Rising, Sidi Bou Said, Collapsed Lung, Fretblanket, Machine Gun Feedback and many others.

As well as being support on tour with Pop Will Eat Itself during January 1993, Scrash had also been the opening act during Pop Will Eat Itself's record-breaking five-night residency at the Marquee Club, London in April the previous year.

Scrash were described in the national and music press at that time as "(they) effortlessly blend sonic walls of noise and samples of phlegm into finely crafted pop songs ... (they are) as glamorous as a donkey on Skegness Beach, but marginally less attractive", "One of the best live bands around this year", "New recruits to the Stourbridge Mafia", in reference to the then endless stream of top indie bands emanating from the small West Midlands town (such as Pop Will Eat Itself, The Wonderstuff, Ned's Atomic Dustbin, Fretblanket), "Stourbridge’s latest Wunderkind".

== Radio and media ==
In addition to their live work, Scrash came to national prominence in May 1992 when a previously unreleased demo version of their track "Funtime" won the "Soundclash" competition on GLR Radio (BBC 94.9)'s weekly Gary Crowley show. The song was then played numerous times on the show in the following weeks. Previous winners of the "Soundclash" competition include Suede and Sidi Bou Said.

The video to "Funtime" (now available on YouTube) was aired on early evening Central TV during a focus on bands in the West Midlands.

== Deals ==
Scrash were signed to the Doofer You management company and to the XS Press press agency, as well as to the ITB concert agency. They were courted for 18 months by most of the UK major labels at that time and were offered two record deals during that period: one with independent record label Behemoth Records and one with German industrial label Dynamica (who also had the successful UK industrial band Cubanate on their books at that time). Scrash refused to sign either deal.

Scrash produced a number of remixes for other artists during this period, most notably two remixes (the first in a techno style, the second in a sample-heavy industrial style) for the London-based indie band Boomslang's "Rage" single.

== Personnel ==
- Michael Fox (guitar; drum-machine, synth and sampler programming)
- Luke Sweeney (vocals)
- Darren Pataki (bass guitar; backing vocals; drum-machine, synth and sampler programming)
- Tim Gascoigne (drums)
