= Ashtrayhead (album) =

Studio album by Ashtrayhead
- Released: 21 April 1997
- Genre: Industrial, techno, metal
- Length: 58:31
- Label: Dynamica; DY 0024-2; EAN 4006030602425; Invisible Records; INV 089 CD; UPC 017046988926
- Producer: Marc Heal

Ashtrayhead is an album by the English group Ashtrayhead, released in 1997. It was a side project by Marc Heal of Cubanate.

== Background ==
Ashtrayhead is the band's only album. It was released on 21 April, 1997 in Europe by Dynamica, and on May 27, 1997, in the United States by Invisible Records. The original CD sleeve and cover featured a heavily made-up Heal with several hundred cigarettes glued to his head.

Heal had conceived the album with guitarist Si Rapley, his former bandmate in Westwon (who initially dissolved in the early 1990s). Westwon were more synthpop in nature, and thus they disbanded as Heal had wanted to go in a more industrial direction with Cubanate (formed with Westwon keyboardist Graham Rayner). Ashtrayhead also featured third member John Simonds on programming/keyboards.

== Reception ==
Professional ratings
Review scores
Source	Rating
Allmusic	2.5/5 stars
babysue.com	(Good)
sonic-boom.com	(not rated)

== Track listing ==
1. "Ashtrayhead" (Heal) – 5:23
2. "Handyman" (Heal/Simonds) – 4:14
3. "Good Doggy" (Heal/Simonds) – 4:42
4. "Homemovies" (Heal/Simonds) – 4:54
5. "My Private Pornostar" (Heal) – 7:54
6. "Playmate" (Heal/Simonds) – 4:33
7. "Phone Call" (Heal/Simonds) – 4:15
8. "Godprawn" (Heal/Simonds) – 4:20
9. "Spooky Thoughts" (Heal) – 6:11
10. "Handyman EXTENDED" (Heal/Simonds) – 5:41
11. "Good Dubby" (Heal/Simonds) – 6:25

Published by Polygram Music / Copyright Control
except 1, 5 & 9 by Polygram Music

== Credits ==
- Gobhead: Heal
- Proghead: Simonds
- Axehead: Rapley
- Knobhead: Atkins at the Spike
- Breadhead: Blackaby at Ardent

Thanx to: All the Usual Suspects and notably Ian B (as ever), Paul Green, Doug Martin, Shep Ashton, Martin Atkins, Jeffrey Churchwell, Sean Roberts

- Sleeved by Greg Jakobek @ Warsaw
- Photography by Ian Jackson
