= Antimatter (album) =

Studio album by Cubanate
- Released: 1993
- Genre: Industrial rock, Industrial, techno
- Length: 53:45 (UK); 66:10 (U.S.)
- Label: Dynamica Records
- Producer: Marc Heal, Kevin Brewster-White (GHCQ Studios), Doug Martin (Spike Studios)

Cubanate chronology
Antimatter (1993)	Cyberia (1995)

Professional ratings
Review scores
Source	Rating
AllMusic	2/5 stars

Antimatter is the 1993 debut album of UK industrial band Cubanate. "Body Burn" notably became the band's first music video and single. Antimatter is the band's only release by its original lineup. While Marc Heal and Phil Barry stayed in the band, Graham Rayner and Steve Etheridge instead departed afterwards to form the duo K-Nitrate. The two were replaced by Julian Beeston (also known as Joolz).

Two versions of Antimatter were released. The original UK release featured 11 songs (10 originals and one remix). The US release featured 13 songs (seven from the UK release and six new additions). It omitted the tracks "Revolution Time", "Sucker", "Switch", and "Body Burn (Ext. D-Code Mix)", but added four tracks from the band's Metal EP: "Angeldust", "Metal (D-Code Hard Mix)", "Angeltrance (D-Code Mix)", and "Junky (D-Code Industriance Mix)". Two songs were also added from the "Body Burn" single: "Body Burn (D-Code Club Mix)" and "Body Burn (Joolz Extended Mix)". Kevin Brewster-White was credited as a co-producer on the album, although he went by the alias "D-Code" for the various remixes.

A few years after its release, "Autonomy" received attention (in an instrumental version) as it was featured in the video game Gran Turismo, alongside three tracks from Cubanate's Cyberia album. "Body Burn" was eventually featured in a 2007 episode of the television show The Sopranos.

== Track listing ==
=== UK version ===
All tracks are written by Heal and Rayner, except otherwise noted

No.	Title	Writer(s)	Length
1.	"Black Out"	Heal, Etheridge, Brewster-White	5:04
2.	"Body Burn"	Heal, Brewster-White	3:55
3.	"Revolution Time"		5:20
4.	"Autonomy"		4:36
5.	"Junky"		4:54
6.	"Exert/Disorder"		4:47
7.	"Sucker"		5:38
8.	"Switch"		4:30
9.	"Forceful"		6:26
10.	"Body Burn (Ext. D-Code Mix)"	Heal, Brewster-White	4:47
11.	"Kill or Cure"	Heal, Rayner, Barry	3:46

=== US version ===
No.	Title	Writer(s)	Length
1.	"Body Burn"	Heal, Brewster-White	3:54
2.	"Angeldust"	Heal, Barry	6:32
3.	"Autonomy"	Heal, Rayner	4:38
4.	"Metal (D-Code Hard Mix)"	Heal, Barry, Brewster-White	6:17
5.	"Junky"	Heal, Rayner	4:54
6.	"Black Out"	Heal, Etheridge, Brewster-White	5:02
7.	"Exert/Disorder"	Heal, Rayner	4:44
8.	"Forceful"	Heal, Rayner	6:26
9.	"Kill or Cure"	Heal, Rayner, Barry	3:46
10.	"Body Burn (D-Code Club Mix)"	Heal, Brewster-White	5:08
11.	"Angeltrance (D-Code Mix)"	Heal, Barry	7:00
12.	"Junky (D-Code Industriance Mix)"	Heal, Rayner	9:22
13.	"Body Burn (Joolz Extended Mix)"	Heal, Brewster-White	4:58

== Personnel ==
- Marc Heal – vocals, programming, producing
- Graham Rayner – keyboards, programming
- Steve Etheridge – drums, keyboards
- Phil Barry – guitars
- Kevin Brewster-White – producing
- Doug Martin – producing
- Jor Jenka – executive producing
