= K-Nitrate =

English industrial band

- Origin: London, England
- Genres: Industrial rock; industrial metal; industrial techno; EBM
- Years active: 1993–present
- Labels: Cyber-Tec Records; SPV Records; Cold Spring; Advoxya Records; MOMT Records; Armalyte Industries
- Members: Graham Rayner; Christian Weber
- Past members: Steve Etheridge; Jo Weber; Dan Waldman

K-Nitrate is a British electronic/industrial band formed in 1993, consisting of Graham Rayner and Christian Weber. The band's founders were original Cubanate members Rayner and Steve Etheridge. K-Nitrate released their debut album Xenophobia in 1994. Etheridge departed from the band after appearing on the follow-up album in 1997, Hyperphobia. Rayner briefly continued K-Nitrate as a solo project, but then Weber joined K-Nitrate not long after, which stabilized the core of the band. The pair released Active Cell in 2007, followed by Voltage in 2010 and Stark Punkt in 2011. K-Nitrate then released the album Kiloton Endgame in 2020.

In addition to K-Nitrate, Rayner and Weber also perform under the name Audio War. Their debut album, Negativity, was released in 2004.

== History ==
=== Early projects, formation, and Xenophobia (1990–1995) ===
In 1990, British musician Graham Rayner joined the dance rock band Westwon as keyboardist. At that point, Westwon were signed to the BMG division Music for Nations. Westwon had previously toured with Gary Numan in 1987, and Numan also produced one of their demo tapes. Although the band (primarily Westwon's core duo of vocalist Marc Heal and guitarist Si Rapley) recorded two singles, Heal became dissatisfied with the band's pop-leaning sound. As a result, Heal and Rayner branched off to form the industrial-oriented band Cubanate. The pair recruited guitarist Phil Barry (Rayner's former bandmate in an ambient band called Anatomy) and drummer Steve Etheridge to finalize the initial lineup.

Cubanate's original lineup self-released a demo EP in 1992. After signing to Dynamica Records, the band released a single ("Body Burn") in early 1993 and their debut album (Antimatter) in late 1993. Around the same time, Rayner and Etheridge departed from Cubanate in order to pursue other musical interests. The two thus formed the band K-Nitrate later that same year.

K-Nitrate released their debut album, Xenophobia, in 1994. Various record labels handled the release in certain regions, such as Metropolis Records and Cold Spring. Notably, Xenophobia was the first release on Cyber-Tec Records. Cyber-Tec was formed by manager/artist Paul Green. The label's name was Cyber-Tech Records for Xenophobia's release, but Green subtly changed the name to Cyber-Tec afterwards. K-Nitrate also got involved with other projects related to Cyber-Tec. They contributed to the band C-Tec's self-titled debut album in 1995, which featured three K-Nitrate remixes. A K-Nitrate song, "Rich Bitch", also appeared on the Cyber-Tec compilation Cyber-Tec America in conjunction with Martin Atkins' label Invisible Records.

=== Hyperphobia, Weber's joining, and creation of Audio War (1996–2006) ===
Dan Waldman joined K-Nitrate as guitarist in 1996, although he left the band the following year. Later in 1997, the band released Hyperphobia. It consisted of five then-new compositions, one re-recorded song, and seven remixes. Hyperphobia was notably distributed by the prominent German label SPV Records, in addition to Cyber-Tec. Around the same time, Etheridge departed from the band and the music industry entirely. Rayner initially continued K-Nitrate as a solo project, but by the end of 1997, Christian Weber had joined the band in a variety of roles (initially as a programmer/percussionist). In early 1998, a Cubanate song that Rayner had co-written and contributed to, "Autonomy" (originally from the 1993 Antimatter album), appeared on the soundtrack to the PlayStation racing game Gran Turismo. Gran Turismo eventually sold over 10 million copies worldwide, which made it the best-selling PlayStation game of all time. In 1999, Jo Weber joined K-Nitrate on guitar for a brief period of time. From roughly 2000 to 2001, Rayner teamed up with Heal once again in Cubanate. A handful of songs were created for an album titled Search Engine, but the album was eventually shelved indefinitely when Heal put Cubanate on hiatus for nearly a decade.

K-Nitrate contributed the song "Fat America (The A.I. Club Mix)" for the compilation Defcon 1: Industrial Dawn. The 2001 compilation was the debut release by the UK independent label Armalyte Industries as it showcased a variety of industrial/electronic bands, such as K-Nitrate, Haloblack, and Cubanate. Rayner and Weber also formed the band Audio Warfare UK in 2001. They self-released a demo album, Defeat, in 2001 through MP3.com's distribution system. Soon after, they shortened the band's name to Audio War. In 2003, K-Nitrate covered Front Line Assembly's "Solitude of Confinement" for the MOMT Records compilation Replicate 01. The following year, Audio War's proper debut album, Negativity, was released in 2004 by MOMT. Also in 2004, Weber made his studio debut under the alias DJ Bug as he contributed a remix to The Aggression's compilation Revisionist History. Rayner also briefly pursued a solo project under the name Audacity. The project's sole album, Faceless, was released in 2006 by MOMT. Rayner was also a guitarist in the side project KreuzDammer. Armalyte Industries released their debut EP in 2006, Shot Down in Flames. It was co-produced by KreuzDammer and Heal.

=== Active Cell, Voltage, and Stark Punkt (2007–2018) ===
Weber and Rayner refocused on K-Nitrate in 2007 when they released the album Active Cell that year through MOMT. The liner notes in Active Cell contained a password which led to a free download of the companion remix album Mutagen, which featured remixes by K-Nitrate and various other musicians, such as The Pain Machinery, Paul Taylor (Gusto Extermination Fluid), and UCNX. UCNX in particular became frequent collaborators with Weber and Rayner afterwards. Also in 2007, K-Nitrate contributed a cover of the Chemlab song "Codeine, Glue & You" to the tribute album Songs From the Hydrogen Bar: A Tribute to Chemlab.

In 2010, K-Nitrate switched labels to Advoxya Records with the release of the album Voltage. The band quickly followed up with the 2011 release of Stark Punkt, albeit on the label Armalyte Industries. Similar to Hyperphobia in 1997, Stark Punkt contained a mixture of new compositions and re-recorded/remixed songs. K-Nitrate and the Scottish band Metaltech contributed to each other's tracks on the compilation Remix Theory in 2011 as well; however, the label that released the compilation (United Noise Records) went under not long after. Audio War was then revived via the self-released EPs Destroy in 2015 and Fracture in 2017.

=== Kiloton Endgame and continued career (2019–present) ===
Starting in 2019, K-Nitrate's releases were gradually added onto digital outlets, mainly Bandcamp. Along with the band's full-length albums, some of the releases included older one-off singles and promotional EPs. They then self-released the full-length album Kiloton Endgame in 2020. In early 2025, Weber was credited for mastering a split single released by UCNX and Numb. It was Numb's first release in nearly six years. Later that same year, K-Nitrate digitally released the single "C-Resistor", which featured vocals from UCNX's Greg Sirfer and Doug Sudia.

== Members ==
=== Current ===
- Graham Rayner – vocals, keyboards, programming (1993–present)
- Christian Weber – programming, keyboards, percussion (1997–present)

=== Former ===
- Steve Etheridge – percussion, programming (1993–1997)
- Dan Waldman – guitars (1996–1997)
- Jo Weber – guitars (1999–2002)

== Discography ==
=== Studio albums ===
- Xenophobia (1994, Cyber-Tec Records/Cold Spring/Metropolis Records)
- Hyperphobia (1997, Cyber-Tec Records/SPV Records)
- Active Cell (2007, MOMT Records)
- Voltage (2010, Advoxya Records)
- Stark Punkt (2011, Armalyte Industries)
- Kiloton Endgame (2020, Independent)

=== Remix albums ===
- Mutagen (2007, MOMT Records)
- ReVolt (2019, Independent)
