= Westwon =

- Origin: United Kingdom
- Genres: Dance, rock fusion
- Years active: 1986–1992
- Label: Music for Nations
- Spinoffs: Cubanate; Ashtrayhead; K-Nitrate
- Past members: Si Rapley; Bill Colbourne; Marc Heal; Graham Rayner; Mick Caddick

Westwon were a dance/rock fusion band formed in 1986 and who supported Gary Numan on the 1987 Exhibition Tour. They were signed to the major label Music for Nations, but disbanded due to musical differences in 1992.

== History ==
Westwon formed in 1986 with the lineup of Bill Colbourne on vocals, Si Rapley on guitar, Marc Heal on keyboards, and Mick Caddick on drums. Westwon gained the support of Gary Numan, who co-produced one of their demo tapes. Westwon acted as openers for Numan on his 1987 Exhibition Tour. Westwon's debut album, The Album, was released in 1988 on the independent label Brouhaha Records. The Album was co-produced by Colin Thurston and Pierre Laurin.

Heal took over as vocalist following the departure of original frontman Colbourne. By early 1990, the members consisted of Heal on vocals, Rapley on guitar, Caddick on drums, and Graham Rayner on keyboards.

Demo Chart, a short-lived magazine that promoted unsigned UK acts, conducted an interview with Heal in the May 1990 edition when Westwon reached No. 1 in the magazine's chart.

The Canadian label that Heal referred to, Brouhaha, called the interview "both fascinating and one-eyed". The Head of A&R for the label at the time claimed "the facts are that the label spent in excess of £70,000 recording and mixing, but Westwon refused to promote the first, eponymous album by insisting on a complete remix which would have cost an additional £25,000. Brouhaha, quite rightly, refused to do so, and this was the reason for the fallout. No management dispute, simply a change of the goalposts once the game has started, given that the band were involved in the creative process from day one. I believe the original album is an unreleased classic, and the label still retains ownership of the master tapes".

In June 1990, Westwon signed to UK metal label Music for Nations on the FAA imprint, releasing two singles: "National Radio" (1991) and "Control" (1992). The dance remixes of "Control" were fair-sized club hits. By the time of the single releases, the band became a two-piece with only Heal and Rapley remaining. A second album was recorded but never released.

Westwon disbanded in 1992 and Heal went on to form Cubanate with Rayner. Kevin Brewster-White, who produced Westwon's 1990s singles, had also co-produced Cubanate's debut album Antimatter. Heal and Rapley later reunited and collaborated on Ashtrayhead's eponymous 1997 album.

== Discography ==
=== Album ===
- Westwon (1988) (Brouhaha CDCUE10)
1. "Arena"
2. "Julia"
3. "Violence"
4. "Berlin"
5. "Decadence" (1)
6. "Dead Model"
7. "North American Girl"
8. "Blue"
9. "England"
10. "Cover Girl"
11. "Love You to Death"
12. "Decadence" (2)
13. "Julia" (Extended)
14. "Arena" (Extended)

=== Singles ===
- 1991: "National Radio"
- 1992: "Control"

== See also ==
- Cubanate
- C-Tec
- Pigface
