= Mortal Kombat: More Kombat =

Compilation album by Various Artists
- Released: November 5, 1996
- Genres: Electronica, industrial rock, alternative metal
- Label: TVT
- Producers: Lawrence Kasanoff and Steve Gottlieb

Singles from Mortal Kombat: More Kombat
- 1. "Come2gether" Released: 1996

Professional ratings
Review scores
Source	Rating
AllMusic	3/5 stars

Mortal Kombat: More Kombat is a compilation album featuring primarily exclusive music from a number of metal, industrial and electronica bands inspired by the first Mortal Kombat film. It is not an actual soundtrack to the movie, however. Cubanate's "Oxyacetylene" had already been released as a single from their 1994 album Cyberia, and would later be included in instrumental form in the soundtrack for non-Japanese releases of Gran Turismo. Babylon Zoo's "Spaceman" had already been released as a single in early 1996. Alien Factory's "Higher" later turned up in the second movie, Mortal Kombat Annihilation, and Juno Reactor's "The Journey Kontinues" was later released under the title "Biot Messiah" on the single "God Is God" (1997). Psykosonik's "It Has Begun" and Sister Machine Gun's "Deeper Down" appeared in the animated series Mortal Kombat: Defenders of the Realm. Track 16 is exclusive to the cassette release and was taken from the EBN's album Telecommunication Breakdown.

== Track listing ==
1. Psykosonik - "It Has Begun" (exclusive)
2. Alien Factory - "Higher"
3. Sepultura - "Chaos B.C." (remix of Refuse/Resist)
4. Killing Joke - "Drug" (exclusive)
5. God Lives Underwater - "Weight" (exclusive)
6. Sister Machine Gun - "Deeper Down" (exclusive)
7. Gudrun Gut - "Firething"
8. Loaded - "Fatality" (exclusive)
9. Crawlspace - "My Ruin"
10. Babylon Zoo - "Spaceman"
11. Chemlab - "Exiled" (edit)
12. Cubanate - "Oxyacetylene"
13. GZR - "Outworld" (exclusive)
14. The Crystal Method - "Come2gether" (exclusive)
15. Juno Reactor - "The Journey Kontinues" (exclusive)
16. Emergency Broadcast Network - "Electronic Behaviour Control System Ver2.0"
