= Darker (album) =

Studio album by C-Tec
- Released: 1 September 1997
- Genre: EBM
- Length: 48:38
- Label: Synthetic Symphony
- Producer: Marc Heal

C-Tec chronology
| Cyber-Tec (1995) | Darker (1997) | Cut (2000) |

Alternative cover
- digital issue cover

Darker is the debut studio album of C-Tec, released on 1 September 1997 by Synthetic Symphony. The album showcases the band wanting to experiment by integrating different styles and textures into their compositions after the release of their 1995 EP Cyber-Tec. On 5 October 2018 the album was reissued as a music download with an additional track titled "My Unbreakable Code" and written by Marc Heal.

== Reception ==
Professional ratings
Review scores
| Source | Rating |
|---|---|
| AllMusic | 4/5 stars |
| Pitchfork | (8.2/10) |

Greg Prato of AllMusic said "the aptly titled Darker is industrial-influenced, aggressive electronic dance music with all of the necessary ingredients for success -- the vocals are sung with the mandatory pissed-off foreign accent, and the music drills into your brain with ease." Pitchfork described the music as having "high-energy, egomaniacal attitudes" and claimed "as any good darkwave album would, it also takes a plunge into the lonelier side of despair and isolation." In May 1998 the album peaked at numbers eight and sixty-one on CMJ New Music Monthly's top dance releases and top radio airplay.

== Track listing ==
All lyrics are written by Jean-Luc de Meyer, except "Epitaph" written by Dorothy Parker.

| No. | Title | Music | Length |
|---|---|---|---|
| 1. | "Random" | Jean-Luc de Meyer; Marc Heal | 4:56 |
| 2. | "Flowing" | Rhys Fulber; de Meyer; Heal | 8:40 |
| 3. | "Foetal" | de Meyer; Heal | 5:47 |
| 4. | "Silent Voices" | de Meyer; Ged Denton | 3:40 |
| 5. | "Being Nothing" | de Meyer; Denton; Heal | 5:08 |
| 6. | "The Lost" | de Meyer; Heal | 4:59 |
| 7. | "Stateless" | de Meyer; Heal | 5:09 |
| 8. | "Shift IV" | de Meyer; Denton; Heal | 3:56 |
| 9. | "Epitaph" | de Meyer; Heal | 6:23 |

2018 digital issue bonus track
| No. | Title | Music | Length |
|---|---|---|---|
| 10. | "My Unbreakable Code" | Heal | 4:00 |

== Accolades ==
| Year | Publication | Country | Accolade | Rank |
|---|---|---|---|---|
| 1998 | CMJ New Music Monthly | United States | "Top 25 Dance" | 8 |
| 1998 | CMJ New Music Monthly | United States | "CMJ Radio Airplay: Top 75" | 61 |
"*" denotes an unordered list.

== Personnel ==
Adapted from the Darker liner notes.

C-Tec

- Jean-Luc De Meyer – vocals
- Ged Denton – keyboards
- Marc Heal – keyboards, vocals, production

'Additional performers

- Phil Barry – sampler
- Rhys Fulber – sampler, additional production
- Björn Jünemann – sampler
- Daniel Myer – sampler
- Dejan Samardzic – sampler

Production and design

- Jim Marcus – cover art (reissue)
- Doug Martin – engineering, additional production
- Jules Seifert – remastering (reissue)

== Release history ==
| Region | Date | Label | Format | Catalog |
|---|---|---|---|---|
| Europe | 1997 | Synthetic Symphony | CD | CD 085-61572 SPV |
| United States | 1997 | Wax Trax!/TVT | CD | TVT 7252 |
| United States | 1998 | Wax Trax!/TVT | CS | TVT 7252 |
| Poland | 2004 | Союз/Synthetic Symphony | CS | 085-61572 SPV |
| United Kingdom | 2018 | Armalyte Industries | DL | |
