= Diva X Machina 3 =

Compilation album by Various artists
- Released: 2000
- Genre: Industrial; EBM; dark wave
- Length: 72:17
- Label: COP Intl.

COP International V/A chronology
The Electronic Challenge Vol. 3 (1999)	Diva X Machina 3 (2000)	New Violent Breed Volume 2 (2001)

Diva X Machina 3 is a various artists compilation album released in 2000 by COP International. The compilation peaked at #19 on the CMJ RPM charts in the U.S.

== Reception ==
In reviewing Diva X Machina 3, Elektronski Zvuk noted the popularity of the series and Hexedene as a standout of the collection. Alex Steininger of In Music We Trust called the album a "a powerful, seductive breath of life that will allow you to never look at the originals in the same light again."

== Track listing ==
No.	Title	Writer(s)	Artist	Length
1.	"Groundloop"	Klive Humberstone; Nigel Humberstone	In the Nursery	5:06
2.	"Betrayal" (Crocodile Shop Remix)	Maria Azevedo; Shawn Brice; Evan Sornstein	Battery	5:08
3.	"Digital Angel"	Jonathan Sharp	Hexedene	4:35
4.	"You Want Me, You Hate Me"	Martha M. Arce; Christian Kobusch	Distorted Reality	3:47
5.	"P-Machinery"	Claudia Brücken; Ralf Dörper; Susanne Freytag; Michael Mertens	Propaganda	3:48
6.	"Secrets & Dreams"	La Floa Maldita	La Floa Maldita	3:11
7.	"Stern"	Thomas Rainer; Hannes Medwenitsch	L'Âme Immortelle	5:07
8.	"Chiasm"	Emileigh Rohn	Chiasm	6:23
9.	"Saviour"	Julie Ferris; Tom Ferris; Drew Maxwell	Moev	4:31
10.	"Alicia" (1999 Remix)	Ryan Lum; Suzanne Perry	Love Spirals Downwards	4:41
11.	"Stay"	Aesma Daeva	Aesma Daeva	5:10
12.	"Heart of Lilith"	Tony McKormack; Candia Ridley	Inkubus Sukkubus	3:20
13.	"Strange - Baby - Strange" (Club Mix)	Gitane Demone	Gitane Demone	5:03
14.	"Oblivious" (Single Edit)	Corey Gunderson; Karen Kardell	The Razor Skyline	3:40
15.	"Pariah"	Danielle Dax	Danielle Dax	3:43
16.	"Double Barrel Prayer"	Diamanda Galás	Diamanda Galás	5:01

== Personnel ==
Adapted from the Diva X Machina 3 liner notes.

- Kim Hansen (as Kim X) – compiling
- Nadine – cover art, illustrations Stefan Noltemeyer – mastering
- Christian Petke (as Count Zero) – compiling, design

== Release history ==
Region	Date	Label	Format	Catalog
United States	2000	COP Intl.	CD	COP 057
