= The Electronic Challenge Vol. 3 =

Compilation album by Various artists
- Released: November 30, 1999
- Genre: Industrial; EBM
- Length: 73:45
- Label: COP Intl.

COP International V/A chronology
New Violent Breed (1998)	The Electronic Challenge Vol. 3 (1999)	Diva X Machina 3 (2000)

The Electronic Challenge Vol. 3 is a various artists compilation album released on November 30, 1999 by COP International.

== Reception ==
Professional ratings
Review scores
Source	Rating
Allmusic	3/5 stars

AllMusic gave The Electronic Challenge Vol. 3 a two-out-of-five possible stars. CMJ New Music Monthly commended The Electronic Challenge Vol. 3 for "present[ing] a slew of blood-boiling, hard-hitting tracks from industrial giants and rising renegades."

== Track listing ==
No.	Title	Writer(s)	Artist	Length
1.	"Provision" (Reclamation Mix)	Rhys Fulber; Bill Leeb	Front Line Assembly	6:31
2.	"Fatherland" (Andrew Eldritch Remix)	Ralf Dörper; Jürgen Engler	Die Krupps	4:38
3.	"Let Your Body Die" (Birmingham 6 "Convulsive Dance" Mix)	Jean-Luc De Meyer; Ged Denton; Jonathan Sharp	Cyber-Tec Project	6:07
4.	"Open Your Eyes" (Numb Remix)	Shawn Brice; Christian Petke	Deathline International	4:02
5.	"Ich bin ein Ausländer" (Die Krupps Remix)	Clint Mansell; Vestan Pance	Pop Will Eat Itself	4:15
6.	"Transparent Frequencies" (Klupp Miks)	Volker Lutz	Evils Toy	4:15
7.	"Cinder Cinder Girl" (Radio Cut)	Cody Cast; Eric Lawrence Chamberlain	Index	4:52
8.	"Attracted by the Light" (Carbon 12 Remix)	Michael Hillerup; De Meyer; Kim Løhde Petersen	Birmingham 6	5:20
9.	"Headhunter 2000" (Empirion Mix)	Daniel Bressanutti; Patrick Codenys; Richard Jonckheere; De Meyer	Front 242	7:13
10.	"Suspended"	David Collings; Don Gordon	Numb	5:03
11.	"Bloodmoney"	Dirk Ivens	Dive	3:04
12.	"Learning to Fly"	Claus Larsen	Leæther Strip	5:05
13.	"Crowning Glory"	Rhys Fulber; John McRae; Chris Peterson; Jeff Stoddard	Will	5:26
14.	"Rausch/Die Interimsliebenden" (Single Edit)	Blixa Bargeld; Mark Chung; Alexander Hacke; F.M. Einheit; N.U. Unruh	Einstürzende Neubauten	7:53

== Personnel ==
Adapted from the liner notes of The Electronic Challenge Vol. 3.

- Marcus Becker – compiling
- K. Dee – compiling
- Christian Petke (as Count Zero) – compiling
- Gunnar Schreck – compiling
- Guido Nockermann – photography

== Release history ==
Region	Date	Label	Format	Catalog
United States	1999	COP Intl.	CD	COP 045
