= New Violent Breed =

Compilation album by Various artists
- Released: July 21, 1998
- Genre: Electro-industrial
- Length: 73:33
- Label: COP Intl.

COP International V/A chronology
Infiltrate & Corrupt! (1998)	New Violent Breed (1998)	The Electronic Challenge Vol. 3 (1999)

New Violent Breed series chronology
New Violent Breed (1998)	New Violent Breed Volume 2 (2001)

New Violent Breed is a various artists compilation album released on July 21, 1998 by COP International.

== Track listing ==
No.	Title	Writer(s)	Artist	Length
1.	"Goddess"	Louis Diaz	Threat Level 5	3:54
2.	"Take Care!" (Careless Version)	Kai Schmidt; Gerrit Thomas	Funker Vogt	5:23
3.	"Solitary" (Signals Edit)	Ronan Harris; Mark Jackson	VNV Nation	5:26
4.	"Hero" (Aghast View Mix)	Dennis Ostermann; Jörg Schelte	In Strict Confidence	5:54
5.	"Crashtime"	Philip Caldwell; Steve Watkins	Scar Tissue	5:56
6.	"Martyr"	Scott Sturgis	Pain Station	5:31
7.	"Smoky Mountains 98"	Eric de Vries; Udo Wiessmann	Winterkälte	4:57
8.	"So Close"	Dirk Ivens; Eric Van Wonterghem	Sonar	2:54
9.	"Suffering" (United Fake State Mix)	Matt Eno; Steve Morell	Dust in Bass	5:11
10.	"God, Where Are You"	Dennis Schober; Michael Thielemann	Solitary Experiments	4:01
11.	"Oh, Lord" (Inverse Narthex Vocal Mix)	Cody Cast; Eric Lawrence Chamberlain	Index	6:38
12.	"Wasteground" (DSP Edit)	Mads Fogt	Chain	3:58
13.	"Red 5"	Oliver Taranczewski; Stephan Voigt	Yavin 4	4:25
14.	"Truthlike" (Biopsy RMX)	Guilherme Pires; Denis Rudge; Fabricio Viscardi; Rodolfo Viscardi	Aghast View	5:22
15.	"The Fear"	Samuel Pfannkuche; John Ricker	Pulse Legion	4:03

== Personnel ==
Adapted from the New Violent Breed liner notes.

- Kim Hansen (as Kim X) – compiling
- Louis "Magic" Zachert – mastering
- Nadine – cover art
- Christian Petke (as Count Zero) – compiling, design

== Release history ==
Region	Date	Label	Format	Catalog
United States	1998	COP Intl.	CD	COP 042
