= Barbarossa (album) =

Studio album by Cubanate
- Released: 1996
- Genre: Industrial, techno
- Length: 46:37
- Label: Dynamica Records

Cubanate chronology
Cyberia (1995)	Barbarossa (1996)	Interference (1998)

Professional ratings
Review scores
Source	Rating
Allmusic	4.5/5 stars

Barbarossa is a 1996 industrial album by the UK band Cubanate. The track "Joy" from the album has been released as a single.

== Track listing ==
1. "Vortech I" – 2:57
2. "Barbarossa" – 6:13
3. "Joy" – 3:32
4. "Why Are You Here?" – 4:32
5. "Exultation" – 4:24
6. "The Musclemen" – 3:47
7. "Come Alive" – 5:56
8. "Vortech II" – 6:43
9. "Lord of the Flies" – 8:33
