= Twelve (Cobalt 60 album) =

Studio album by Cobalt 60
- Released: 1998
- Studio: Dreamworld, Letterston, Wales, United Kingdom
- Genre: Electro-industrial, EBM
- Length: 47:27
- Label: Facedown
- Producer: Robert Wilcocks

Cobalt 60 chronology
Elemental (1996)	Twelve (1998)

Twelve is the second album by Cobalt 60, a side-project of Front 242's Jean-Luc De Meyer.

== Reception ==
The album received positive reviews from the magazines Sonic Seducer and Trinity.

== Track listing ==
No.	Title	Writer(s)	Length
1.	"Wail"	Jean-Luc De Meyer, Dorothy Parker, Robert Wilcocks	4:47
2.	"Rainbow Warrior"	De Meyer, Olivier Simon, Wilcocks	4:14
3.	"Melissa"	De Meyer, Wilcocks	4:48
4.	"12 Months"	De Meyer, Simon, Wilcocks	3:52
5.	"Sweet Violets"	Parker, Holly Rodgers, De Meyer, Wilcocks	1:00
6.	"Daylight Armed Robbery"	De Meyer, Wilcocks	3:00
7.	"Crows"	Jens Schröder, Karin Sherret, Wilcocks	4:30
8.	"It"	De Meyer, Dominique Lallement	3:20
9.	"Dolphin"	De Meyer, Wilcocks	3:43
10.	"Midnight Waltz"	De Meyer, Judith Morelle, Wilcocks	4:19
11.	"N!"	De Meyer, Wilcocks	4:54
12.	"That Day"	De Meyer, Wilcocks	5:00

Limited edition CD bonus tracks
No.	Title	Writer(s)	Length
1.	"Prophecy (Terminalmix)"	De Meyer, Lallement, Wilcocks	4:07
2.	"Darwin Was Right"	De Meyer, Lallement, Wilcocks	4:39
3.	"Galactic Hives"	De Meyer, Lallement, Wilcocks	4:35
4.	"It is Not"	De Meyer, Lallement	3:20
Total length:			16:41

== Personnel ==
=== Cobalt 60 ===
- Jean-Luc De Meyer – vocals, machines, mixing
- Dominique Lallement – machines
- Robert Wilcocks – guitar, machines, production, mixing

=== Additional musicians ===
- Mark McCleeryey – additional percussion (1, 7, 10)
- Judith Morelle – vocals (10)
- Holly Rodgers – guitar (5)
- Olivier Simon – guitar (2, 4, 7, 12)
- The Heathfield Choir – vocals (12)
- Jens Schröder – engineering
- Gerd Schröder – artwork
- Fredrik Clement – baby portrait
