= Choking on Lilies =

Studio album by Hexedene
- Released: 1997
- Recorded: September 1995 – June 1997
- Studio: Mission Control (Maryport, Cumbria, UK)
- Genre: Electro-industrial
- Length: 61:28
- Label: Matrix Cube
- Producer: Loretta Sterling

Hexedene chronology
Choking on Lilies (1997)	Bullet Proof Diva's (2001)

Alternative cover
- 1998 reissue cover

Choking on Lilies is the debut studio album of Hexedene, released in 1997 by Matrix Cube. The album was re-issued in 1998 with an expanded and rearranged track listing by Re-Constriction Records.

== Reception ==
Scott Hefflon of Lollipop Magazine gave Choking on Lilies a positive review, saying "a nice break from all the boring electro" and "a band like this that carries off the aloof aggression of electro, rocking out, and sweet, ethereal vocals is quite a find." Despite criticizing the overabundance of remixes, Sonic Boom also gave the album a positive write-up, saying that "Katie had a very strong vocal range that could be very lush on slower tracks like 'Everything and Nothing' or more aggressive such as on 'Only Human'. Ian's guitar work was always complimentary, never dominating or hiding in the final mixdown. These elements combined with Jonathan's obvious electronic wizardry was bordering on perfection."

== Track listing ==
All tracks are written by Katie Helsby, Ian Palmer and Jonathan Sharp

No.	Title	Remixer(s)	Length
1.	"Breathe"		4:36
2.	"Everything"		4:26
3.	"Turn"		4:52
4.	"Fade Out From Me"		5:09
5.	"Close My Eyes"		3:25
6.	"Hex-Break"		2:19
7.	"Breathe" (Trance Mix)	Jonathan Sharp	5:03
8.	"Only Human" (Original Mix)	Jonathan Sharp	4:29
9.	"Damage"		4:49
10.	"White Out"		3:11
11.	"Close My Eyes" (Internal Mix)	John N. Sellekaers	4:30
12.	"Turn" (Pierrepoint Mix)	Dave Kirvel	5:41
13.	"Damage" (The Dust of Basement Mix)	Sven Wolff	4:28
14.	"Only Human" (Bastard Mix)	Jonathan Sharp	4:29

1998 Reissue
No.	Title	Remixer(s)	Length
1.	"Turn"		4:52
2.	"Only Human" (Bastard Mix)	Jonathan Sharp	4:31
3.	"Breathe"		4:35
4.	"Everything and Nothing"		4:26
5.	"Hex-Break"		2:19
6.	"Damage"		4:48
7.	"Fade Out From Me"		5:08
8.	"Close My Eyes" ('97 Re-Build)	Jonathan Sharp	3:25
9.	"White Out"		3:11
10.	"Breathe" (Regurgifate Mix)	Tom Muschitz	5:23
11.	"Everything And Nothing" (Oneiroid Psychosis Remix)	Lars Hansen & Leif Hansen	5:33
12.	"Breathe" (SMP Remix)	Jason Bazinet	4:29
13.	"Close My Eyes"		5:14
14.	"Breathe" (Gunhed Remix)	Jonathan Sharp	3:51
15.	"Breathe" (Minimal Mix)	Boom chr Paige	3:03

== Accolades ==
Year	Publication	Country	Accolade	Rank
1998	CMJ New Music Monthly	United States	"Dance"	12
"*" denotes an unordered list.

== Personnel ==
Adapted from the Choking on Lilies liner notes.

Hexedene

- Katie Helsby – lead vocals
- Ian Palmer – guitar
- Jonathan Sharp – programming, guitar, photography

Production and design

- Séba Dolimont – production and engineering (11)
- Loretta Sterling – production, photography
- Stuart Turnbull – photography

== Release history ==
Region	Date	Label	Format	Catalog
1997	Germany	Matrix Cube	CD	tri 014
1998	United States	Re-Constriction	CD	REC-039
