= Second skin =

Second skin may refer to:

== Film and television ==
- Second Skin (1999 film), a Spanish romantic drama film
- Second Skin (2008 film), an American documentary film
- "Second Skin" (Deep Space Nine), a 1994 TV episode

== Literature ==
- Second Skin (novel), a 1964 novel by John Hawkes
- Second Skin (Decide Your Destiny), a 2008 adventure book based on Doctor Who

== Music ==
- Second Skin (band), an American gothic rock band

=== Albums ===
- Second Skin (John Course and mrTimothy album), 2008
- Second Skin (The Mayfield Four album), 2001

=== Songs ===
- "Second Skin" (song), by the Gits, 1991
- "Second Skin", by the Chameleons from Script of the Bridge, 1982
- "Second Skin", by Hugo Largo from Drum, 1998
- "2econd Skin", by Moonspell from Sin/Pecado, 1998
