= Elemental (Cobalt 60 album) =

Studio album by Cobalt 60
- Released: October 15, 1996
- Recorded: 1996, Doghouse Studio, Henley-On-Thames
- Genre: Electro-industrial/EBM
- Length: 47:47
- Label: Edeltone
- Producer: Craig Leon

Cobalt 60 chronology
Elemental (1996)	Twelve (1998)

Professional ratings
Review scores
Source	Rating
Allmusic	3/5 stars

Elemental is the first album by electronic band Cobalt 60, a side-project of Front 242's Jean-Luc De Meyer.

== Track listing ==
1. "Bye Bye" – 3:58
2. "Sad" – 2:11
3. "T.O.M.A.M." – 3:51
4. "Before" – 3:41
5. "You Are" – 4:19
6. "The Worried Well" – 5:11
7. "If I Was" – 3:34
8. "La Mort" – 4:50
9. "In the Valley" – 4:37
10. "Born Again" – 4:49
11. "Little Planet" - 3:42
12. "Poor Poor Pam" - 3:04

== Personnel ==
- Jean-Luc De Meyer - vocals
- Dominique Lallement - machines
- Cassell Webb - backing vocals on "Little Planet"
