= Jonathan Sharp =

English musician and sound designer

- Also known as: New Mind; Bio-Tek; The Heartwood Institute; Psionic; Tyrophex 14; Henning Zinoviev & Floating Candles
- Origin: Cumbria, England
- Genres: Electronic body music; industrial; electro-industrial; experimental
- Occupations: Musician; producer; sound designer
- Years active: 1990-present
- Labels: Off Beat; Zoth Ommog Records; Machinery; Fifth Colvmn; Reverb Worship; Doppler Effect
- Formerly of: Cyber-Tec Project; Hexedene; Hyperdex-1-Sect; Takshaka; Novus; Barking At Butterflies
- Website: https://sonic-boom.com/mission-control/

Jonathan Sharp is an electronic body music / industrial musician and professional sound designer from Cumbria, England, who has released music under the names New Mind, Bio-Tek, The Heartwood Institute, and others. He was also a member of the bands Cyber-Tec Project, Hexedene, and Hyperdex-1-Sect.

== Career ==
=== Early life ===
As a child Jonathan was a classically trained musician, having played piano and violin. As a teenager taught himself to play guitar and his interests began drifting from classical music towards experimental guitar oriented music in the vein of Swans, as well as early industrial and electronic music including Neu! and Helden. Drawing on a fascination with the work of the BBC Radiophonic Workshop, Jonathan eventually acquired a Roland synthesizer in order to make sounds of his own.

=== New Mind ===
New Mind was formed as a solo project of Jonathan Sharp in 1990. Prior to creating New Mind, Jonathan played guitar and sampler in an experimental band where he thought of electronic and industrial musics as being distinct. It was when Jonathan took a suggestion to listen to Skinny Puppy that he had a revelation that led to the creation of New Mind.

The first New Mind demo, Bacteriophage, was recorded on 4-track in 1991. This was followed by the EP Body Politic which was released by the Sadisque, an imprint of the UK-based Vinyl Solution label. New Mind was initially offered an expanded record deal with Sadisque but the deal fell through. Jonathan contributed tracks to several compilations during the following year including releases by Sentrax Records, Dossier, and The Empty Quarter before being signed to Machinery Records in 1993.

The first New Mind album, Fractured, was released by Machinery Records in 1993. This was the only release on Machinery as the label did not find the initial material for the second album, Zero To The Bone, to their liking. Zero To The Bone was eventually released by Fifth Colvmn Records in 1995. While Fractured displayed the obvious influence of Skinny Puppy with a more straightforward EBM and electro style, Zero explored a wider variety of electronic music styles infused with guest female vocalists.

After setbacks with both Fifth Colvmn and Cyber-Tec, Jonathan sent initial demos of tracks from Forge to Stefan Herwig at Off Beat. This led to a multi-album deal with Off Beat.

=== Cyber-Tec Project ===
In 1995, Jonathan became a founding member of Cyber-Tec Project along with Jean-Luc De Meyer and Ged Denton. Jonathan was unexpectedly replaced in the band by Marc Heal after the release of the band's first album.

=== Bio-Tek ===
Jonathan considered New Mind to be his main musical project and did not wish to constrain his musical output under that name to any particular genre or style. His affinity for "European" EBM, however, led him to develop a second solo project, Bio-Tek, as an outlet for that particular style. While he was releasing music as New Mind on Off Beat, Jonathan secured a deal with seminal German record label, Zoth Ommog, to release music as Bio-Tek. The first two albums, A God Ignored Is A Demon Born and Darkness My Name Is were released on Zoth Ommog, after which Sharp moved the project to Doppler Effect Records due to friction with new Zoth Ommog head Torben Schmidt.

=== Hyperdex-1-Sect ===
The relationship with Zoth Ommog via Bio-Tek led to a collaboration between Jonathan and André Schmechta of X Marks the Pedwalk that became Hyperdex-1-Sect. Their album Metachrome was released by Synthetic Symphony in 1997 and featured tracks that Jonathan had originally written for Cyber-Tec Project, reconstructed by André and reformatted with female vocals.

=== Hexedene ===
In 1997, Jonathan formed Hexedene with Katie Helsby and Ian Palmer. The band received praise for layering a techno sound with gothic, industrial and pop music leanings.

=== Production & Remixes ===
During the 1990s, Jonathan produced many remixes as New Mind for bands such as Aïboforcen, Birmingham 6, Scar Tissue, Inertia, Aghast View, and Attrition. He also recorded many one-off compilation tracks under various names, including: Datura, Gunhed, Lashtal, Nova, Psionic, Tyrophex 14, Vent, and Zodiac.

=== The Heartwood Institute ===
Beginning in 2015, Jonathan began releasing 1970s-inspired, "haunting" music under the name The Heartwood Institute. As Heartwood, Jonathan explores occult and magical themes in a more downtempo-oriented music format. Jonathan began performing live at themed events as Heartwood beginning in 2017.

=== Library music and solo recordings ===
By the year 2000, Jonathan discovered library music and began making recordings for hire under his own name on behalf of many publishers including his own company, Summer Witch Music. Over the next several years Jonathan temporarily ceased his commercial music production in deference to his new career.

Contemporary with his work as The Heartwood Institute, Jonathan embarked on recordings under his own name of "elegiac piano-led pieces" with an autobiographical theme inspired by photographs taken during his childhood. His release Divided Time focuses his childhood years of 1970—1977 when he would split his time between his parents' houses in London and Cumbria.

=== Henning Zinoviev & Floating Candles ===
In 2022, Sharp produced a pair of releases inspired by classic 1970s era horror soundtracks under the name "Henning Zinoviev & Floating Candles."

== Discography ==
=== As New Mind ===
- Body Politic (12" EP, 1991, Sadisque)
- Fractured (CD, 1993, Machinery Records, Think Tank)
- Zero to the Bone (CD, 1995, Fifth Colvmn Records)
- Forge (CD, 21 October 1997, 21st Circuitry, Off Beat)
- Deepnet (CD, 1998, Off Beat, Gashed!) – #18 CMJ RPM Charts, U.S.
- Phoenix (CD, 2001, Doppler Effect)

=== As Bio-Tek ===
- A God Ignored Is A Demon Born (CD, 1996, Zoth Ommog, Cleopatra)
- Darkness My Name Is (CD, 1997, Zoth Ommog)
- Punishment For Decadence (CD, 1999, Doppler Effect, Wire Productions) – #15 CMJ RPM Charts, U.S.
- The Ceremony Of Innocence (CD, 2002, Doppler Effect, Wire Productions)

=== As Barking At Butterflies ===
- Disappear With The Stars (CD EP, 2008, Lakeland Records)
- Armor Plated (digital, 2011, Doppler Effect)

=== As The Heartwood Institute ===
- Astercote (CD, 2015, Reverb Worship)
- The Wild Hunt Of Hagworthy (CDr, 2015, Reverb Worship)
- Calder Hall: Atomic Power Station (CDr, 2016, Reverb Worship)
- Mix Tape One (Cass, 2017, The Heartwood Institute)
- The Whispering Knights (CDr, 2017, Reverb Worship)
- Secret Rites (LP/digital, 2018, Polytechnic Youth)
- Barsham Faire (7" single, 2018, Polytechnic Youth)
- The Divided Self (EP, 2018, Sleep FUSE)
- Tomorrow's People (LP, 2019, Polytechnic Youth)
- w/ Tomorrow Syndicate, The Home Current Remixes (7" single, 2019, Polytechnic Youth)
- w/ Panamint Manse, Parapsychedelia (LP, 2020, Castles in Space)
- Lovely Lightning / Ringstone Round (7" single/digital, 2020, Sleep FUSE)
- Witchcraft Murders (LP, 2021, Library Of The Occult)
- w/ Hawksmoor, Concrete Island (Cass/digital, 2021, Spun Out Of Control)
- Land Of The Lakes (LP, 2021, Castles in Space)
- Noah's Castle (7" single, 2021, Library Of The Occult)
- Mardale (CDr, 2022, Sleep FUSE)
- The Carhullan Army (Cass, 2022, Bibliotapes)
- Witch Phase Four (CDr, 2022, Sleep FUSE)
- Hedges (Cass, 2022, Woodford Halse)
- Conqueror Worm (7" single, 2022, Feral Child Records)

=== As Jonathan Sharp ===
- Titanium Rain, Episode One (Dramatized) (LP/digital, 2011, AudioComics)
- Divided Time (LP/digital, 2019, Castles in Space)
- Kensington, 1974 / Kendal Steam Gathering, 1975 (7" single, 2019, Castles in Space)
- Niavka (Soundtrack, Cass, 2023, Spun Out Of Control)

=== As Henning Zinoviev & Floating Candles ===
- Die Nude For Satan (Soundtrack, 2022, Library Of The Occult)
- La Quinta Vittima (Soundtrack, 2022)
