= The Alien Conspiracy =

Studio album by Crisis n.T.i.
- Released: October 17, 1995
- Studio: Beaumont Street Studio (Huddersfield, England); New Mind Studios (Cumbria, England)
- Genre: EBM; industrial
- Length: 55:28
- Label: Synthetic Symphony/Cyber-Tec

The Alien Conspiracy is the debut and only studio album by Crisis n.T.i., released in 1995 by Synthetic Symphony and Cyber-Tec Records. The album was reissued by Fifth Colvmn Records on October 17, 1995.

== Reception ==
Sonic Boom praised Gentons artistic growth as a composer, saying "add a grittier focused edge to the music, a concise theme used throughout the album, and the logical progression from Cyber-Tec to Crisis N.T.I. is obvious."

== Track listing ==
All music is composed by Ged Denton.

No.	Title	Length
1.	"Crisis"	2:44
2.	"Earth Under Threat"	3:34
3.	"Radiance"	4:44
4.	"Praying to the Aliens"	2:19
5.	"Radar Visual"	2:39
6.	"Moon"	2:14
7.	"Aura"	2:23
8.	"Moons"	3:11
9.	"We Are Not Alone"	2:53
10.	"Defiance"	4:02
11.	"Crisis. Xtended" (Hardfloor)	4:20
12.	"Crisis. Destroy the Earth" (New Mind)	4:23
13.	"Early Warning"	16:01

== Personnel ==
Adapted from The Alien Conspiracy liner notes.

Crisis n.T.i.

- Ged Denton – instruments

Additional performers

- Kevin Gould – instruments
- Richard McKinlay – instruments

Production and design

- Stef Michalski (Room237) – cover art, illustrations, design
- Zalman Fishman – executive-production

== Release history ==
Region	Date	Label	Format	Catalog
Germany	1995	Synthetic Symphony/Cyber-Tec	CD	SPV084-61262, C-TEC4
United States	October 17, 1995	Fifth Colvmn	CD	9868-63205
