= Bullet Proof Diva's =

Studio album by Hexedene
- Released: August 15, 2001
- Recorded: July 1997 – April 2001
- Studio: Mission Control (Maryport, Cumbria, UK)
- Genre: Electro-industrial
- Length: 53:05
- Label: Matrix Cube
- Producer: Loretta Sterling

Hexedene chronology
Choking on Lilies (1997)	Bullet Proof Diva's (2001)

Bullet Proof Diva's is the second studio album by Hexedene, released on August 15, 2001, by Matrix Cube.

== Track listing ==
No.	Title	Writer(s)	Remixer(s)	Length
1.	"Digital Angel"	Alexys B, Jonathan Sharp		4:37
2.	"I Am the Fear"	Sarahjane, Jonathan Sharp		4:02
3.	"Ashes"	Daemon Cadman, Jonathan Sharp		4:37
4.	"Dreams in the Witch House"	Terri Kennedy, Jonathan Sharp		3:45
5.	"Whiteout" (Permafrost Remix)	Katie Helsby, Jonathan Sharp	Takshaka	4:52
6.	"Ascension"	Alexys B, Jonathan Sharp		4:44
7.	"Sell Out"	Daemon Cadman, Jonathan Sharp		4:01
8.	"Strange Utopia"	Alexys B, Jonathan Sharp		3:37
9.	"Return to the Witch House"	Terri Kennedy, Jonathan Sharp		2:26
10.	"Whiteout" (Deepcore Remix)	Katie Helsby, Ian Palmer, Jonathan Sharp	Takshaka	4:32
11.	"Breathe" (Dream Mix)	Katie Helsby, Ian Palmer, Jonathan Sharp	The Tantrum Twins	6:20
12.	"Digital Angel" (Remix)	Alexys B, Jonathan Sharp	Implant	5:32

== Personnel ==
Adapted from the Bullet Proof Diva's liner notes.

Hexedene

- Jonathan Sharp – programming, guitar

Additional musicians

- Alexys B – lead vocals (1, 6, 8, 12)
- Daemon Cadman – lead vocals (3, 7)
- Terri Kennedy – lead vocals (4, 9)
- Katie Helsby – lead vocals (3, 10, 11)
- Sarahjane – lead vocals (2)

Production and design

- Loretta Sterling – production

== Release history ==
Region	Date	Label	Format	Catalog
1997	Germany	Matrix Cube	CD	tri 107
