= Cyberia (album) =

Studio album by Cubanate
- Released: January 23, 1995
- Recorded: July 1994 – September 1994
- Studio: Spike, London, England
- Genre: Electro-industrial; industrial rock; techno
- Length: 58:17 (UK); 67:29 (U.S.)
- Label: Dynamica
- Producer: Cubanate, Doug Martin, Kevin White, Marc Heal

Cubanate chronology
Antimatter (1993)	Cyberia (1995)	Barbarossa (1996)

Professional ratings
Review scores
Source	Rating
AllMusic	3/5 stars
Infectious Substance	Favourable

Cyberia is a 1995 album by UK-based industrial band Cubanate. The album features one of the band's most well known songs, "Oxyacetylene", which was also included alongside "Skeletal", "Industry" and "Autonomy" (from the Antimatter album) in instrumental versions in the video game Gran Turismo.

== Track listing ==
=== UK release ===
1. "Cyberia" – 1:16
2. "Oxyacetylene" – 4:02
3. "Hatesong" – 4:44
4. "Build" – 4:47
5. "Transit" – 5:44
6. "Skeletal" – 4:21
7. "Human Drum" – 7:03
8. "Das Island" – 2:05
9. "Industry" – 4:42
10. "False Dawn" – 7:14
11. "Hatesong (Extended)" – 6:01
12. "Oxyacetylene (Extended)" – 6:18

=== U.S. release ===
1. "Cyberia" – 1:16
2. "Oxyacetylene" – 4:02
3. "Hatesong" – 4:44
4. "Build" – 4:47
5. "Transit" – 5:43
6. "Skeletal" – 4:21
7. "Human Drum" – 7:03
8. "Das Island" – 2:05
9. "Industry" – 4:47
10. "Hatesong (Extended)" – 6:01
11. "Oxyacetylene (Extended)" – 6:20
12. "Oxyacetylene (Extended Remix)" – 6:54
13. "Skeletal (Remix)" – 4:27
14. "Body Burn (Julian Beeston Mix Extended)" – 4:59
