= Pigmartyr =

Studio album by Watts
- Released: May 17, 2004
- Genre: Industrial rock, industrial metal
- Length: 47:33
- Label: Grand Recordings
- Producer: Raymond Watts, Eden

Watts chronology
Genuine American Monster (1999)	Pigmartyr (2004)	Compound Eye Sessions (2015)

Alternative cover
- 2005 re-release cover

Pigmartyr (2004) is an album by Raymond Watts, a.k.a. PIG. This was the first album he released under the moniker Watts instead of PIG. The first copies (approx. 500) were signed and numbered by Raymond Watts. The album was remastered and rereleased through Metropolis as a PIG album under the title Pigmata in 2005, with three additional tracks mixed by Isaac Glendening of Cesium 137.

== Album information ==
Raymond Watts' first release since 1999's Genuine American Monster, Pigmartyr is a bit of a departure from typical Pig material. Gone are most of the bombastic string sections and orchestral influence, Pigmartyr takes a turn toward the hard rock side, and has a much more raw and stripped down feel.

The album was largely recorded in London, UK, with a number of collaborators, including a duet ("Take") with UK rocker Harry (a.k.a. Dirty Harry) and two songs ("Situation" and "Here to Stay") co-written with Marc Heal of Cubanate.

Pigmartyr was originally planned as a PIG band album under the title Lust for Lard. After a series of drawn-out recording sessions and release date changes, it was eventually released by Grand Recordings as a Watts album in the summer of 2004.

== Track listing ==
=== Original UK release ===
1. "Suck Spit Shit" 5:28
2. "Here to Stay" 3:33
3. "Reject" 3:53
4. "Situation" 3:39
5. "Kundalini" 5:44
6. "Vitriol Vice and Virtue" 5:16
7. "Take" 5:04
8. "Arbor Vitate" 4:33
9. "Stage Slut" 4:20
10. "Junky" 6:03

=== Remastered US release ===
1. "Suck Spit Shit" – 5:29
2. "Here To Stay" – 3:31
3. "Reject" – 3:51
4. "Situation" – 3:38
5. "Kundalini" – 5:46
6. "Vitriol Vice & Virtue" – 5:15
7. "Take" – 5:01
8. "Arbor Vitate" – 4:33
9. "Stage Slut" – 4:20
10. "Junky" – 6:04
11. "God Rod" – 5:27
12. "On the Slaughterfront" – 6:46
13. "Filth Healer" – 5:21

== Personnel ==
- Raymond Watts – vocals, guitars, programming
- Martin Eden – bass, programming, backing vocals
- Steve White – guitars, programming
- Jules Hodgeson – guitars
- Andy Selway – drums
- Arianne Schreiber – backing vocals
- Isaac Glendening – re-mastering

with

- Marc Heal – additional programming on "Situation" and "Here To Stay"
- Harry – vocals on "Take"
- Bryan Black – backing vocals on "Junky"
- Oliver Grasset – additional programming on "Junky"
- Jules Cooper – additional guitars

== Album information ==
Under Grand Recordings, Pigmartyr was not mastered, and many people could not get the album. It was soon remastered and re-released under Metropolis Records under the PIG moniker and a new title, Pigmata. Raymond recorded three bonus songs for the album as well as having Isaac Glendening of Cesium 137 mix them. The album went on to become a rather large success at Metropolis Records, keeping the #1 spot on Metropolis' best-seller list for several weeks.
