= Cubanate =

English industrial band

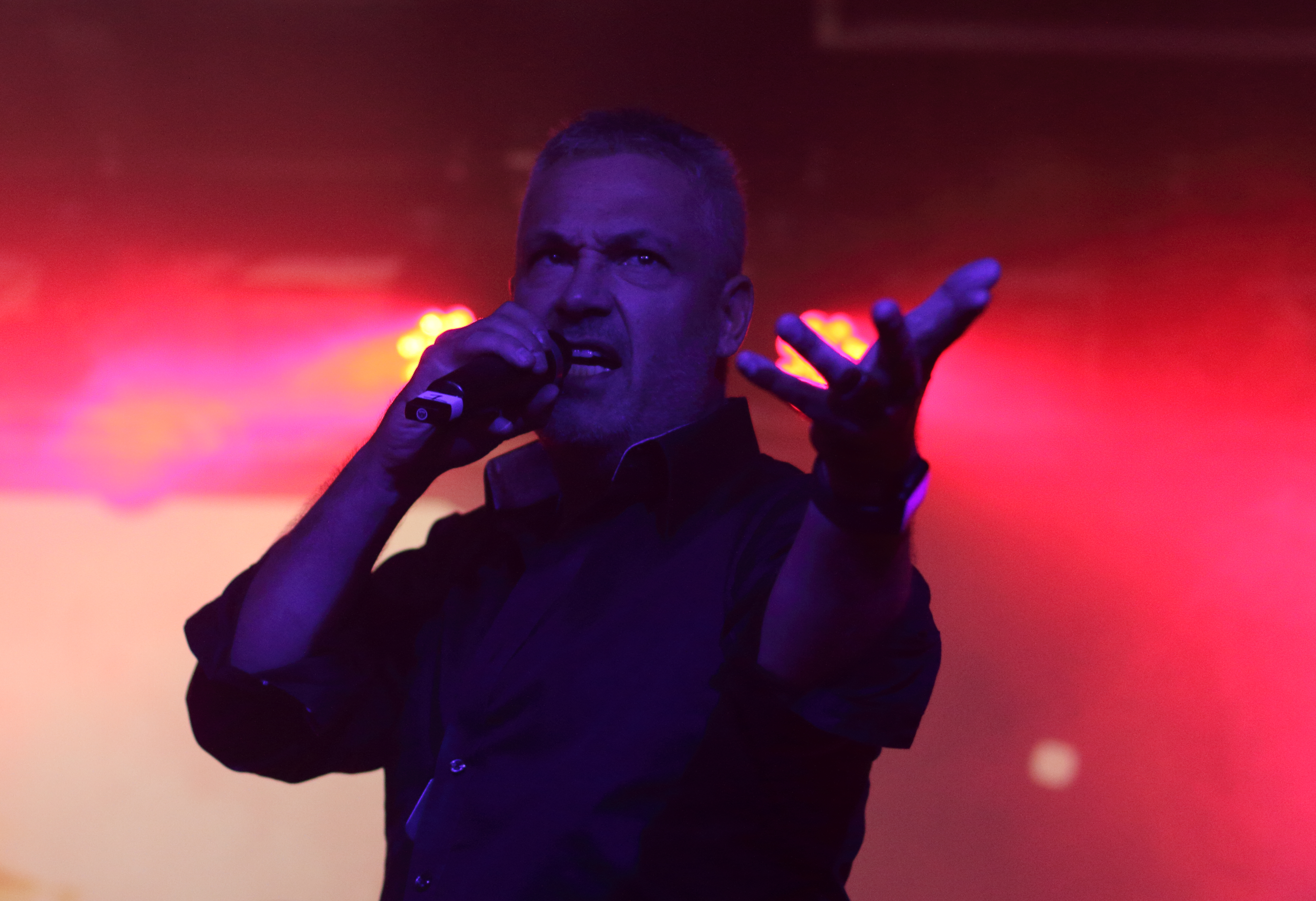
- Cubanate in 2018

Background information
- Origin: London, England
- Genres: Electro-industrial; techno; industrial metal
- Years active: 1992–2001; 2010–2011; 2016–2022
- Labels: Dynamica; TVT; Wax Trax!; Armalyte Industries
- Spinoffs: C-Tec; K-Nitrate; MC Lord of the Files; Ashtrayhead; Audio War; Be My Enemy
- Spinoff of: Westwon
- Past members: Marc Heal; Phil Barry; Graham Rayner; Steve Etheridge; Julian Beeston; Roddy Stone; David Bianchi; Darren Bennett; Shep Ashton; Rog Carne; Vince McAley; Reza Udhin

Cubanate were an industrial band from London, England, founded in 1992 by Marc Heal (vocals), Graham Rayner (keyboards), Phil Barry (guitars), and Steve Etheridge (drums). The group became well known for their combination of electro-industrial with distorted heavy metal guitars and techno percussion (later incorporating breakbeats). After the release of their debut album Antimatter in 1993, Rayner and Etheridge departed from the band. From that point on, Cubanate revolved around Heal and Barry, with various other musicians joining the lineup at times.

In 1995, Cubanate released their second album Cyberia. It contained the band's most successful single, "Oxyacetylene". Their third album, Barbarossa, followed in 1996. Cubanate then signed with Wax Trax! Records for the release of 1998's Interference. After the release of the band's fifth album (Search Engine) was aborted, Cubanate went into a hiatus. They briefly reunited from 2010 to 2011, and again from 2016 to 2022.

== History ==
=== Formation, Antimatter, initial lineup changes, and Metal (1992–1994) ===
Marc Heal had met Graham Rayner via an ad in the magazine Melody Maker. Heal and Rayner initially played together in the synthpop band Westwon, but they both departed from the band in order to focus on a harder and more industrial-oriented direction. They then recruited Phil Barry and Steve Etheridge to complete the band's original lineup. Barry had previously played guitar with Rayner in an ambient band called Anatomy. Rayner also previously used the name Cubanate for various one-off shows in the UK during the early 1990s, and thus the name was reused for their new band. Cubanate's first recording session was in September 1992 as they recorded two rough versions of the songs "Switch" and "Autonomy". They released a demo cassette shortly after, titled UK 92. Cubanate played their first UK tour in November 1992 supporting UK techno duo Sheep on Drugs. They followed it up with a quick tour of the UK in early 1993. The group signed to Berlin's Dynamica Records, although the label's operations in Germany had hindered the band's reach in the UK.

In June 1993, Cubanate played at the Strawberry Fair in Cambridge. Heal had intentionally provoked the fans in attendance, and the band were escorted out of the festival and were banned from returning. The band's debut album, Antimatter, saw a UK release later in 1993. After the release of the album's lead single, "Body Burn" (which was named "Single of the Week" by Kerrang!), Rayner and Etheridge departed from the band in order to form K-Nitrate. The pair were replaced by Julian Beeston (former Nitzer Ebb drummer). Beeston was brought into the band as drummer and keyboardist. Cubanate toured various European countries in early 1994, and they then released the Metal EP. It featured two new songs ("Angeldust" and "Metal") plus a few Antimatter remixes. In May of that year, the Metal EP was named "Single of the Week" in Melody Maker.

Later in 1994, Cubanate received media attention when they were paired with Carcass for what turned out to be a notoriously violent UK tour ending in death threats to Heal. There was also an on-air confrontation on the Radio One Rock Show with Iron Maiden vocalist Bruce Dickinson. Dickinson had pitched Heal's home phone number live on the air, although it was later revealed that Dickinson had the wrong number. In 1995, Antimatter was belatedly released in the US with an altered tracklisting.

=== Cyberia and Barbarossa (1995–1997) ===
Cubanate's second album, Cyberia, appeared in early 1995. It spawned the hit single "Oxyacetylene". The album peaked at No. 3 on CMJ's RPM Chart in the US. By that point, Beeston was no longer in the band. For the tour in promotion of Cyberia, the band hired Shep Ashton on guitar and Darren Bennett on keyboards. Ashton had previously contributed guitar to a few Cyberia songs. Around the same time, Cubanate contributed a remix to the supergroup C-Tec's self-titled debut album. Heal would go on to join C-Tec as an official member. In October 1995, Cubanate supported Front Line Assembly throughout a tour of Europe. It was followed by Cubanate's first ever tour of the US during the last two months of 1995. During the recording of Cubanate's third album, Bennett left the band and was replaced by David Bianchi. After recording finished in early 1996, Ashton also left the band, and he was replaced by Roddy Stone.

Barbarossa, Cubanate's third album, was released in early 1996. "Joy" was released as the album's lead single. Dynamica also promoted the album via releasing a split-compilation album which featured songs by three bands that were signed to Dynamica: Cubanate, Think About Mutation, and Oomph!. Barbarossa was ultimately Cubanate's last release for Dynamica, as the band felt that they were not being promoted sufficiently at that point. Around the same time, "Oxyacetylene" (from Cyberia) was included on the compilation Mortal Kombat: More Kombat, which was a follow-up to the platinum soundtrack Mortal Kombat. In 1997, Heal focused on two side projects, Ashtrayhead and C-Tec. Ashtrayhead released a full-length album in April 1997 on Invisible Records, a label ran by Martin Atkins of Killing Joke and Pigface fame. Heal had created the album with his former Westwon bandmate Si Rapley (guitar), and also John Simonds (programming). That same year, C-Tec released their second album overall, and their first with Heal as vocalist and keyboardist, Darker. C-Tec's other members included Jean-Luc De Meyer (Front 242) and Ged Denton (Crisis n.T.i.).

=== Label switch, Interference, and Search Engine (1998–2002) ===
Cubanate switched labels and signed to Wax Trax! Records in the US (with distribution handled by TVT Records). They released their sole album for the label in 1998, Interference. The album was a departure from Cubanate's earlier techno experiments due to a strong drum and bass influence that alienated some of their traditionalist fans, but was heralded as revelatory by others. "Voids" was released as the album's first single. The album was co-produced by Front Line Assembly's Rhys Fulber. Cubanate toured the US with DJ? Acucrack in support of the album. In mid-1998, four Cubanate songs (from Antimatter and Cyberia) appeared on the soundtrack to the PlayStation racing game Gran Turismo. Gran Turismo eventually sold over 10 million copies worldwide, which made it the best-selling PlayStation game of all time.

By 1999, Rog Carne had joined the band on drums and Beeston had also rejoined the band, albeit as guitarist. Throughout the second half of 1999, Cubanate toured Europe with Fear Factory. After the tour ended, both Carne and Barry had left the band; thus, Heal was the only original member remaining by then. Heal commenced working on Cubanate's fifth studio album, which was given the title of Search Engine. Along with Beeston on guitar, Rayner had also briefly worked in the studio with Heal on a handful of songs as well. The first song from the sessions, "Razor Edge", was released in 2001 on the compilation Defcon 1: Industrial Dawn. It was the first release by the label Armalyte Industries, an industrial-oriented/electronic independent label that eventually grew in size. Another song, "React to It", appeared on the 2002 compilation Cryonica Tanz V.2 by the label Cryonica Music.

=== Disbandment and first reunion (2003–2011) ===
Heal ultimately abandoned the Search Engine project, and he shelved the album, although a full tracklisting was leaked onto the internet shortly after. Heal largely distanced himself from the music industry, although he worked in the studio with a few bands such as PIG, KreuzDammer (Rayner's side project), and Chemlab.

In October 2010, Heal reunited with Barry. A new track titled "We Are Crowd" was released on Alfa Matrix's compilation EBM1. In September 2011, Heal announced that Cubanate had disbanded once again, despite the fact that he and Barry had worked in the studio on a few songs.

=== Second reunion, Kolossus, and hiatus (2012–2022) ===
In 2015, Heal had returned to music via the EP Compound Eye Sessions under the name MC Lord of the Flies. It was released as a joint EP with PIG, as it contained two songs by PIG and two songs by MC Lord of the Flies (plus a few remixes). Barry had remixed one of the tracks as well. In September 2016, Cubanate reformed to play the Cold Waves Festival (an annual industrial music festival held in Chicago). The lineup consisted of Heal, Barry, and drummer Vince McAley. The festival lineup included The Cocks (ex-Revolting Cocks members), PIG, 16volt, Dead When I Found Her, Bloody Knives, and Kanga, many of whom had previously collaborated with Heal in projects such as Pigface and C-Tec.

In May 2017, Cubanate released a compilation album titled Brutalism via Armalyte Industries. Brutalism contained 14 remastered songs from Cubanate's first three albums. After playing a few UK shows that year, Cubanate toured alongside Front Line Assembly in the US. Cubanate also played Cold Waves Festival again, albeit at the festival's first event in Los Angeles as opposed to Chicago. The following year, Reza Udhin replaced McAley on drums for a few shows in the UK. Also in 2018, PIG's ninth studio album Risen was released. It notably contained the song "Prey & Obey", which was derived from the 2011 Cubanate song "We Are Crowd" (Heal and Barry were credited as co-writers and co-producers of "Prey & Obey"). "Prey & Obey" ultimately became one of PIG's most popular songs as it amassed over a million streams on Spotify.

In 2019, Cubanate released Kolossus on Armalyte Industries. The EP featured five original compositions plus two remixes. One of the songs, "Vortex", was originally unofficially released during the Search Engine sessions under the name "Infiltrator". In November 2022, Cubanate played at the Zero Day Festival in London. The band eventually became inactive afterwards as Heal and Barry focused on other projects.

== Style ==
Cubanate has been described often as electro-industrial. AllMusic wrote that the band "have explored the hybrid style created by mixing industrial music with the high-speed rhythms of techno". The band also has included elements of industrial metal in some songs, with Heal's vocals compared to the voice of Motörhead's frontman Lemmy Kilmister.

== Members ==
- Marc Heal – vocals, programming (1992–2001, 2010–2011, 2016–2022)
- Phil Barry – guitars (1992–2000, 2010–2011, 2016–2022)
- Graham Rayner – keyboards, programming (1992–1993, 2000–2001)
- Steve Etheridge – drums, keyboards (1992–1993)
- Julian Beeston – drums, keyboards, guitars (1993–1994, 1999–2001)
- Shep Ashton – guitars (1995–1996)
- Darren Bennett – keyboards, percussion (1995–1996)
- Roddy Stone – guitars (1996–1999)
- David Bianchi – keyboards, percussion (1996–1999)
- Rog Carne – drums, percussion (1999–2000)
- Vince McAley – drums, percussion (2016–2018)
- Reza Udhin – drums, percussion (2018–2022)

=== Timeline ===
Color denotes main live duty

== Discography ==
=== Studio albums ===
Title	Year	Notes
Antimatter	1993	US release in 1995 but with an altered tracklisting
Cyberia	1995	
Barbarossa	1996	
Interference	1998	US release also in 1998 but with two tracks removed
Search Engine	2000	Unreleased but leaked to the internet in the 2000s

=== Studio EPs ===
Title	Year	Notes
UK 92	1992	Demo tape which featured tracks that later appeared on the Antimatter album
Metal	1994	A few tracks were later added to the US reissue of the Antimatter album
Kolossus	2019	Consisted of four original new songs, two remixes, and a reworked version of a song from the Search Engine sessions

=== Other releases ===
Title	Year	Notes
Brutalism	2017	Compilation of songs from the band's first three albums
Live Brutalism	2018	Live album recorded in 2017

=== Singles ===
Title	Year
"Body Burn"	1993
"Junky"	1994
"Oxyacetylene"	1994
"Joy"	1996
"Voids"	1998
"9:59"	1998
"We Are Crowd"	2011
