= Junkfuel =

Studio album by Fretblanket
- Released: 1994
- Genre: Alternative rock
- Label: Atlas/PolyGram
- Producer: Tim Palmer

Fretblanket chronology
Twisted EP (1994)	Junkfuel (1994)	Songs in B (1994)

Junkfuel is the debut album by the English band Fretblanket, released in 1994.

The band supported the album by opening for Oingo Boingo on a North American tour. Junkfuel's first single was "Twisted".

== Production ==
The band members were still in their teens when they made Junkfuel. The album was produced by Tim Palmer; some percussion was recorded at Smart Studios, in Madison, Wisconsin. Many of the songs are character studies that empathize with their subjects.

== Critical reception ==
Professional ratings
Review scores
Source	Rating
Albuquerque Journal	3/4 stars
AllMusic	3/5 stars
The San Diego Union-Tribune	3/4 stars
Martin C. Strong	4/10

The Chicago Reader noted: "Sounding like the Replacements or Soul Asylum but with guitar-techie precision, these very young men—the oldest is 20—with long shiny hair would be a publicist’s dream if their songs were at all distinctive." Trouser Press concluded that "William Copley's angry, raw-throated vocals and Clive Powell's grunge-guitar attack mark Fretblanket as one of the first British groups to reflect the worldwide influence of Nirvana's Nevermind ... But Junkfuel, with its rampaging hardcore rhythms and pop hooks, owes at least as much to Jawbreaker and the Descendents, and Powell's lyrics showcase a bright new talent with ideas of his own." The San Diego Union-Tribune wrote that Fretblanket "leads off its rambunctious U.S. debut with the aptly named 'Twisted', at the very least a glorious mess of inspired imagery... While less coherent elsewhere on the album, the band is full of intriguing ideas."

The Austin American-Statesman thought that "the parts all seem to fit, but the sum sounds forced and clenched, as if the band hasn't figured out how to loosen up and let itself be a little less stilted." The Seattle Times determined that Junkfuel "is filled with high-energy wailing and plenty of thick guitar-bashing, but they are not without a decided sense of dynamics." Miami New Times opined that "Fretblanket sounds like Soul Asylum without the brains [or] experience."

AllMusic wrote that, "with its bland formula of loud, intricate guitar chords mixed with simplistic, pounding drums and heavy cymbals, Fretblanket sounds an awful lot like Bush."

== Track listing ==
No.	Title	Length
1.	"Twisted"
2.	"Song in B"
3.	"Junkfuelled"
4.	"Transmission"
5.	"Direct Approach"
6.	"I'm Going to Buy a Hang Glider"
7.	"Now We're 30"
8.	"1941"
9.	"Drag"
10.	"Curtainsville"
11.	"Big Fat Ugly"
12.	"You're Welcome"
