= New Violent Breed Volume 2 =

Compilation album by Various artists
- Released: April 2001
- Genre: EBM
- Length: 74:41
- Label: COP Intl.

COP International V/A chronology
Diva X Machina 3 (2000)	New Violent Breed Volume 2 (2001)	Dark Awakening Vol. 1 (2002)

New Violent Breed Volume 2 is a various artists compilation album released in April 2001 by COP International.

== Reception ==
Elektronski Zvuk criticized New Violent Breed Volume 2 for not meeting the success of the previous entry and failing to provide new material of interest for the listener. StarVox Music Zine said the collection "represents the best that terror and noise industrial has to offer" and "stays on target the whole way through -- it has a definite musical theme, and all the tracks stick to it."

== Track listing ==
No.	Title	Writer(s)	Artist	Length
1.	"Sidewalk Sinner"	Dirk Ivens	Dive	3:27
2.	"Nine"	Len Lemeire; Geert Machtelinck	Implant	5:12
3.	"Cold Blood" (Wumpscut Remix)	Mario Melzer	Infact	4:26
4.	"Disolucion"	Racso Agroyam	Dulce Liquido	7:12
5.	"Humanradius"	Bernard Perrin; Uwe Rohlfs	Reversal Penetrations	3:59
6.	"Serious Killer"	Phil Philter; Raoul Roucka	Noisex	4:11
7.	"Slaughterhouse (Slut)" (Assemblage 23 Remix)	Scott Sturgis	Pain Station	4:27
8.	"The Truth Inside of Me"	Dennis Ostermann; Jörg Schelte; Stefan Vesper	In Strict Confidence	5:04
9.	"Neverland" (In Strict Confidence Remix)	Jürgen Engler	Dkay.com	5:03
10.	"Destroy"	Maurice Jackson; Christian Petke	Deathline International	4:21
11.	"Ascension (Cascading Lights)"	G.W. Childs; Jay Tye	Soil & Eclipse	4:21
12.	"Fight" (Continoum Mix By M.O.)	Emileigh Rohn	Chiasm	4:35
13.	"Nuclear Winter"	Kai Schmidt; Gerrit Thomas	Funker Vogt	4:07
14.	"Destruction" (Hard Mix)	Glenn Michael Wallis	NKVD	4:17
15.	"Strategisch Wertvoll" (Special Edit)	Stefan Böhm; Sina Hübner; Leif Künzel	Mono No Aware	4:25
16.	"Animal" (Exclusive Mix)	MS Gentur	MS Gentur	5:34

== Personnel ==
Adapted from the New Violent Breed Volume 2 liner notes.

- Guido Nockemann – photography
- Stefan "D-Core" Noltemeyer – mastering, design
- Christian Petke (as Count Zero) – compiling
- Matthew Vickerstaff – cover art, illustrations

== Release history ==
Region	Date	Label	Format	Catalog
United States	2001	COP Intl.	CD	COP 063
