= Genuine American Monster =

Studio album by PIG
- Released: 1 December 1999
- Recorded: Ranch Apocalypse, London
- Genre: Industrial rock
- Length: 66:15
- Label: Rock Records
- Producer: Raymond Watts

PIG chronology
| Disrupt Degrade & Devastate (1999) | Genuine American Monster (1999) | Pigmartyr (2004) |

Professional ratings
Review scores
| Source | Rating |
|---|---|
| AllMusic | 3/5 stars |

Genuine American Monster is an album by Raymond Watts, under the name PIG. It was initially released in Japan in 1999, and did not see a release in the United States until 22 October 2002 on Metropolis Records. The US release adds one song originally from the Prime Evil EP, bringing the album's total running time to 71 minutes and 14 seconds.

== Track listing ==
1. "Prayer Praise & Profit" (Raymond Watts) – 6:34
2. "Riot Religion & Righteousness" (R. Watts) – 5:36
3. "Salambo" (R. Watts) – 5:11
4. "Whore" (R. Watts) – 6:17
5. "Flesh Fest" (R. Watts) – 5:46
6. "Black Brothel" (R. Watts) – 2:30
7. "Disrupt Degrade & Devastate" (R. Watts, Günter Schulz) – 4:59
8. "F.O.M." (R. Watts) – 6:41
9. "A Fete Worse Than Death" (R. Watts) – 5:17
10. "Cry Baby" (R. Watts, Anna Wildsmith) – 3:19
11. "Inside" (R. Watts, Mike Watts) – 14:01
12. "Save Me (Locust Remix)" (R. Watts) – 4:59
- Track 12 only available on US re-release.

== Personnel ==
- Raymond Watts
- Steve White – guitars, extra programming
- Jules Hodgson – guitars

=== Additional personnel ===
- Günter Schulz – guitars (7)
- Andrew Bennett – guitars (5)
- Lisa Millet – vocals
- Carol Anne Reynolds – vocals
- Anna Wildsmith – vocals
- Mike Watts – keyboards
- Rob Henry – extra programming
- Andy Cooke – extra programming
