= Interference (Cubanate album) =

Studio album by Cubanate
- Released: 14 April 1998
- Recorded: The Spike Studios, London, June–November 1997
- Genre: Industrial rock, drum and bass, jungle
- Length: 66:58 (UK); 50:49 (US)
- Label: Wax Trax!
- Producer: Phil Barry, Rhys Fulber, Marc Heal, Doug Martin

Cubanate chronology
Barbarossa (1996)	Interference (1998)	Kolossus (2019)

Professional ratings
Review scores
Source	Rating
Allmusic	link

Interference is the fourth album by English band Cubanate. In contrast to the band's previous releases, it incorporates drum and bass rhythms instead of regular dance beats, and the lyrics are more introspective and personal than what characterizes Cubanate's older material. Marc Heal described this switch as the necessary evolution of a band that felt stuck at the time:

By 1997 things were a bit broken. When we started Cubanate that techno base seemed radical. Five years later, things had caught up. We were used to being radical, confrontational: we didn’t like being in the mainstream. Anyway, there was a sense that Interference was the last album and we thought, “well, might as well do something different”. Otherwise we would have turned into one of those bands trudging around the industrial scene year after year. I could sense that the life was ebbing out of Industrial music, whatever you want to call it. It was turning into a retro scene. I couldn’t have stood for that.

This album heavily focuses on use of the Amen Break as can be heard in "It", "Isolation", "Hinterland", "Other Voices", and "Voids".

The UK version of the album features two previously unreleased tracks, "Pleasure Kick" and "Ordinary Joe", recorded in 1996; accordingly, these tracks follow the more traditional Cubanate style.

== Track listing ==
=== UK release ===
1. "It" – 3:11
2. "Isolation" – 7:46
3. "9:59" (Note: The track "9:59" is titled "10.41597222" on streaming services.) – 4:27
4. "Hinterland" – 6:10
5. "Ex" – 1:55
6. "Internal" – 4:39
7. "Other Voices" – 5:36
8. "The Horsetrader" – 4:44
9. "Voids" – 4:17
10. "An Airport Bar" – 8:03
11. "Pleasure Kick" – 5:26
12. "Ordinary Joe" – 5:38
13. "9:59 (Front 242 Remix)" – 5:01

=== US release ===
1. "It" – 3:11
2. "Isolation" – 7:46
3. "9:59" – 4:27
4. "Hinterland" – 6:10
5. "Ex" – 1:55
6. "Internal" – 4:39
7. "Other Voices" – 5:36
8. "The Horsetrader" – 4:44
9. "Voids" – 4:18
10. "An Airport Bar" – 8:00
