= Compound Eye Sessions =

Studio album by PIG, MC Lord of the Flies
- Released: April 13, 2015
- Recorded: Fortress Studios, London
- Genre: Industrial
- Label: Armalyte Industries

PIG chronology
Pigmartyr (2004)	Compound Eye Sessions (2015)	Long in the Tooth (2015)

Compound Eye Sessions is a collaboration between Marc Heal (Ashtrayhead, Cubanate) as MC Lord of the Flies and Raymond Watts (PIG, ex-KMFDM). Two songs from the PIG side of the EP titled "Drugzilla" and "Shake" were previously released as rough mixes on Marc Heal's personal SoundCloud page. A limited run of 500 physical copies was released by Armalyte Records on April 13, 2015. The EP is also available digitally through Bandcamp and iTunes. This release also marks the first official PIG release in ten years since 2005's Pigmata, that of which Marc Heal also contributed to.

== Track listing ==
No.	Title	Length
1.	"Drugzilla"	4:13
2.	"The Compound Eye"	5:10
3.	"Shake"	4:09
4.	"The Doll"	3:51
5.	"The Compound Eye (Fulbertron Mix by Rhys Fulber)"	7:13
6.	"Drugzilla (Pork Talk Mix by Raymond Watts)"	4:19
7.	"The Compound Eye (Tsetse Mix by Phil Barry)"	6:36
8.	"Shake (Snakehandler Mix by Marc Heal)"	5:24
Total length:		40:55

== Credits ==
- Produced by Marc Heal
- Guitars and Engineering by Dan Abela
- Vocals and Programming by Marc Heal & Raymond Watts
- Shake and The Doll mixed by Eden
- Mastered by J K Seifert at KSS
- Sleeve Design by Luke Insect
