= Think About Mutation =

Think About Mutation (TAM) was a crossover band from Germany. They were together for about 11 years (1992–2003), with all core six members appearing on every studio album (five albums total). Their music consisted of a mixture of house music, industrial metal, techno, and alternative rock. They were signed to the labels Dynamica, Koch, Universal, and Motor Music. In 2006, two ex-members of the band formed a new project, called The Sonic Boom Foundation.

== Members ==
- Ralf Donis – vocals (1992–2003)
- Joey A. Vaising – guitars, vocals (1992–2003)
- Henrik Zeltner – guitars (1992–2003)
- Steffen Gräfe – keyboards (1992–2003)
- Rajko Gohlke – bass (1992–2003)
- Kay Setzepfand – drums, percussion (1992–2003)
- Endrik Meyfarth – drums (1992)

== Discography ==
=== Studio albums ===
- Motorrazor (1993, Dynamica)
- Housebastards (1994, Dynamica)
- Hellraver (1996, Dynamica/Koch)
- Virus (1998, Motor Music/Universal)
- Highlife (1999, Motor Music/Universal)

=== Singles ===
- "Motorrazor" (1993, Dynamica)
- "Nightmares" (1994, Dynamica)
- "Motorrazor 96" (1996, Dynamica)
- "The Rewinding Seeds" (1996, Dynamica)
- "Reflect It" (1997, Motor Music)
- "Visions" (1997, Motor Music)
- "Irregular" (1998, Motor Music)
- "Car Crashed" (1998, Motor Music)
- "Two Tribes" (1999, Motor Music/Universal)
