= Hexedene =

British electro-industrial group

- Origin: Maryport, Cumbria, England
- Genres: Electro-industrial
- Years active: 1997–2001
- Labels: Matrix Cube
- Past members: Katie Helsby; Ian Palmer; Jonathan Sharp

Hexedene were an English electro-industrial group comprising vocalist Katie Helsby and guitarists Ian Palmer and Jonathan Sharp. They were recognized for fusing techno and industrial with leading female vocals. Helsby and Palmer signed their project Streem to a large record label after recording sessions finished for Hexedene's first album and as a result departed to leave Sharp as the sole member. The band released two albums: Choking on Lilies in 1997 and Bullet Proof Diva's in 2001.

== History ==
Hexedene was conceived in 1997 by composer Jonathan Sharp as a side project to his band New Mind. In order to produce the music Jonathan Sharp wrote completed songs between 1995 and 1997 that he sent on tape to Katie Helsby and Ian Palmer to layer vocals and guitars. After the band recorded in studio together Hexedene released their debut studio album Choking on Lilies on Matrix Cube in 1997. The album received praise for layering its techno sound with gothic, industrial and pop music leanings. In 1998 Re-Constriction Records re-issued the album for American audiences with an expanded and rearranged track listing.

Helsby and Palmer departed from the band in 1998 when Roadrunner Records signed their band Streem. In 1999 Daemon Cadman of Waiting for God collaborated with Jonathan Sharp to record the Shirley Bassey song "Diamonds Are Forever" for the Nod's Tacklebox o' Fun various artists compilation. After a year of development Hexedene's second studio album Bullet Proof Diva's was released on August 15, 2001, by Matrix Cube.

== Discography ==
Studio albums

- Choking on Lilies (1997, Matrix Cube)
- Bullet Proof Diva's (2001, Matrix Cube)
