= Fretblanket =

English power pop band

- Origin: Stourbridge, England
- Genres: Power pop
- Years active: 1990-1999; 2022-present
- Labels: Polygram
- Members: Will Copley (vocals/guitar); Clive Powell (guitar/vocals); Dave Allsopp (bass); Matt Carey (drums)

Fretblanket are an English power pop band from Stourbridge, England.

Fretblanket have had more success in the United States than in their native Britain, which the band put down to the attitude of the British music press. The band has been described as "one of the first British groups to reflect the worldwide influence of Nirvana's Nevermind", although Ride, The Wedding Present, and Swervedriver have also been identified as influences. The band signed to Polygram in 1993 and released their first album, Junkfuel, a year later. Fretblanket had a fairly successful hit in 1997 with the song "Into the Ocean". The video for that song had a short life in regular rotation on MTV the same year, and at the time was the highest-rated video ever on MTV's 12 Angry Viewers. The same year saw the release of a second album, Home Truths From Abroad.

In 2020, the song "Digging Your Scene" was released as part of the compilation Cattle And Hum. The band released it as a single in 2023.

== Discography ==
=== Singles ===
- "Better Than Swimming"
- "Curtainsville"
- Twisted EP
- "Song In B"
- "Into The Ocean" (1997)
- "Digging Your Scene" (2023)

=== Albums ===
- Junkfuel (1994, Polygram)
- Home Truths From Abroad (1997, Polygram)
- The Distance in Between (2023)
