= Second Skin (band) =

American gothic rock band

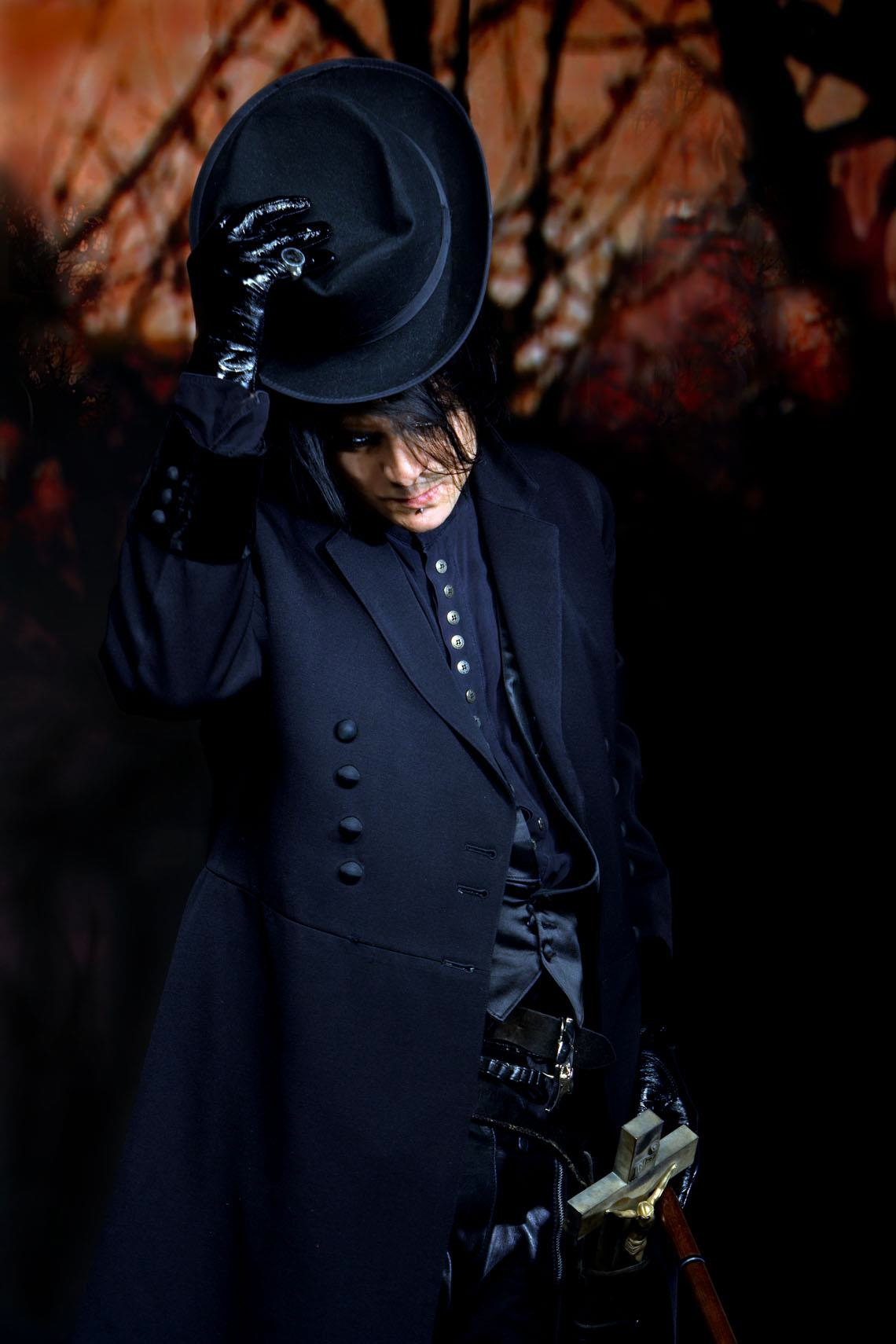
- Arron of the band Second Skin

Background information
- Origin: Seattle Washington United States
- Genres: Gothic rock Deathrock; Darkwave; Industrial Metal; Industrial; Gothic
- Years active: 1991–present
- Labels: Palace of Worms; Euphoria Productions
- Members: Arron – lead vocals, keyboard, lead guitar, bass, drums 1991–present Lady Die – keyboard, backing vocals 2012–present Sasha – guitar 2011–present King – guitar, theremin 2011–present Vidor – drums 2011–present
- Past members: Melissa Gory – lead guitar 2011–2012; Mark Cady – lead guitar 1996–2008; Lizzy – backing vocals 2003–2005; Gary – drums 2003–2005; Johnny Stankovic – bass 2003–2005; Ryan (Rex) – keyboard 1991–1995; Mark Eriksson (Ethan) – lead guitar 1991–1995 "Young" Jim Taylor – rhythm guitar 1991–1995; Paul Baker – bass guitar 1991–1995; Jonathan "Johnny friend" Gillaland – drums 1991–1995; Phillip Misseldine – guitar 1996; Mike Sellers – guitar 1996 All members are credited on various ep's/compilations.
- Website: http://secondskin.net

Second Skin is an American gothic rock band formed in 1991 by singer-songwriter Arron, the frontman of the Seattle-based band, Flesh of my Flesh. Second Skin's sound has been described as "a culmination of punk aggression, early Gothic sensibility and Death Rock driven passions" with "hard rhythmic beats and dark backdrops."

Featured in Mick Mercer's Music to Die For, a listing of bands that were influential in the gothic rock scene, as well as Oskar Terramortis' upcoming This is Gothic Rock book (to be released in 2013), Second Skin has played alongside Rozz Williams (of bands Christian Death and Shadow Project), the Mission UK, the Misfits, Killing Joke, Andi Sexgang, Gary Numan, Missing Persons, Modern English, Human Drama, The Damned, and New Model Army, and has been featured on over 30 studio albums, EPs and compilations.

Second Skin's single "Liberata Me" inspired the film of the same name, Liberata Me, which won best short subject at the New York Film festival. The film featured music and a cameo by Second Skin. Director Pearry Reginald Teo then cast Arron of Second Skin to play the gatekeeper of purgatory in the follow-up, award-winning film Children of the Arcana.

Second Skin is also the first band to produce a darkwave/deathrock 3D music video.

Second Skin's latest release, Illa Exuro in Silentium, the band's fourth studio album, is the follow-up to the band's 2005 album Black Eyed Angel.

In August 2013, it was announced that Second Skin's fifth studio album will be released in the fall of 2013.

== Discography ==
- Hymns for the Hollow – 1993, Euphoria Productions
- Choir Invisible – 2000, Euphoria Productions
- Black Eyed Angel – 2005, Palace Of Worms Records
- Illa Exuro in Silentium – 2007, Palace Of Worms Records

== Limited release tour EPS and singles ==
- The Scourging and the Crowning – 1991, Euphoria Productions
- Tease – 1998, Euphoria Productions
- Skin Samples (dance remixes) – 2000, Euphoria Productions
- Flesh Wounds – 2002, Euphoria Productions
- Taste of Angels – 2003, Euphoria Productions
- Liberata Me – 2004, Euphoria Productions
- The Club Mixes – Flesh Wounds – 2005, Euphoria Productions
- I The East – East Vs. West Mix – 2005, Euphoria Productions

== Soundtracks ==
- Liberata Me – Liberate Me, Trance – 2003, Euphoria Productions, PhysferScreamers Productions

== Compilations ==
- Tales from the Vault vol. 1 – Sweet Nothing – 1995 Allegiance records/11mghz
- Implosion New music sampler – Sweet Nothing (Raw) – 1996, Euphoria Productions
- Children of the Damned – Nasty – 1996, Apollyon Records/Cleopatra Records
- The Gothic Grimoire – Compilation 1/1997 – Zero Below (Antarctic Mix) – 1997, Celtic Circle Productions
- New Wave Goes to Hell – You Spin Me 'Round (Like a Record) – 1998, Cleopatra Records
- New Alternatives Four – Sweet Nothing – 1998, Nightbreed Recordings
- A Tribute to the Mission – Forevermore – Wake (RSV) – 1999, Équinoxe Records
- The Unquiet Grave Volume One – Sweet Nothing – 1999, Cleopatra Records
- Chain D.L.K. Compilation CD #2 – Club Sexxx – 1999, Chain D.L.K.
- Goth Oddity 2000: A Tribute to David Bowie – Let's Dance – 2000, Cleopatra Records
- Only Sorrow – Liberata Me – 2001, Lee Whipple
- Kiss The Night: A Collection Of Unusual Gothic Love Songs – Still My Love – 2002, Cleopatra Records
- The Spooky Halloween Creepshow – Liberata Me – 2002, Apollyon Records
- Our Voices – A Tribute to the Cure – Pictures of You – 2004, Équinoxe Records
- Blackchurch Vol. II – I The East – 2004, X5-452
- Tales from the Vault vol. 2 – I The East (Alternative Mix) – 2005 Allegiance records/11mghz
- 80's Punked – Cry For Love – 2009, unknown
- Gothic Visions II – The Narcissist – 2011, Echozone
- Shadowplay – A Tribute to Joy Division – Control (She's Lost) – 2013, SyborgMusic

== Filmography and music videos ==
- Liberata Me – 2003, Euphoria Productions, PhysferScreamers Productions
- Children of the Arcana – 2003, Aaquinas Productions, Ascension Pictures
- :Per:Version: Vol. 15 – Still My Love – 2005, Ritual
- Gothic Visions II – Still My Love – 2011, Echozone
- Gothic Visions III – Six Ways From Sunday (filmed in both 2D and 3D) – 2012, Echozone
