= Emileigh Rohn =

American singer

- Also known as: Chiasm
- Origin: Ann Arbor, Michigan, United States
- Genres: Industrial, darkwave
- Years active: 1997–present
- Label: COP International
- Website: chiasm.org/

Emileigh Rohn is a solo artist who produces the electronic music project Chiasm sold by COP International records. She has released six albums; Disorder, Relapse, Reform, 11:11, Reset, and Zone. Her music has been featured on many compilation CDs, in the PC video game Vampire: The Masquerade – Bloodlines by Troika Games, on the CBS television series NCIS and in the independent film Extinguish released by Outsider Filmworks. The name Chiasm (Greek χίασμα, "crossing") comes from the biology term of the crossing of optic neurons in the brain that allow people to have continuous and peripheral vision (see Optic chiasm). Chiasm is produced in Detroit, MI United States.

== Origin ==
At the age of five, Emileigh Rohn began taking piano lessons from her church organist, Mildred Benson, and eventually began singing solos in church. By the age of 13 she received a Casiotone keyboard and began experimenting with electronic music. In her final year of high school she joined an experimental/industrial performance art group called Inter Animi.

In the fall of 1997, while studying molecular biology in Detroit, Rohn joined Calvin P. Simmons in his project Dragon Tears Descending (DTD) as a keyboardist doing performances and supporting other bands. Rohn then left DTD and formed her own project Electrophoretic Transfer with sampling from Shane Terpening by 1998.

Chiasm began in 1998 when Rohn began to entirely produce her own music with her first demo CD named "Embryonic" completed in October. Her song "Bouncing Baby Clones" featured on a Detroit Electronica compilation CD, D[elEcTROnIc]T, in the spring of 1999. Later that year, she signed to COP International records, and her first officially released track, "Chiasm" was soon featured on their compilation, "Diva X Machina vol. 3".

== Discography ==
=== Disorder ===
Released in March 2001. A remix album with labelmate Threat Level 5, entitled "Divided We Fall", was also released in 2003. The track "Isolated" was later used in the NCIS episode "Marine Down" and the Vampire: The Masquerade – Bloodlines computer game. The song "Formula" contains audio samples from Independence Day.

Tracks

1. Formula
2. Chiasm 5.0
3. Transparent
4. Disorder
5. Fight
6. Liquefy
7. Isolated
8. Cold
9. Enemy
10. Someone

=== Relapse ===
Released in May 2005.

Tracks

1. Embryonic
2. Surrender
3. Delay
4. Rewind
5. Still
6. X-Ray
7. Incision
8. Phobic
9. Needle
10. Chosen Fate

BONUS TRACKS: Rewind (Floating Tears Mix by ZIA), Surrender (Dark Techno Mix by Threat Level 5)

=== Prefrontal ===
Released in April 2006. Only available on iTunes.

Tracks

1. Prefrontal, Part 1
2. Prefrontal, Part 2
3. Prefrontal (Carphax Files Remix)
4. Biomod "Seed" (Chiasm Mix)
5. Biomod "Seed" (Piano Mix)
6. A Girl Called Harmony
7. Cryostat

=== Reform ===
Released in September 2008.

Tracks

1. Deny
2. Soulprint
3. Unity
4. The Caffeine Cycle
5. Reform
6. A Section Of Time
7. Deceivers
8. Won
9. Incubate
10. Extinguish

=== Apple Island ===
Released in May 2009.

Tracks

1. Apple Island
2. Fake Smile
3. Major Tom (English version)
4. Reform (Soil & Eclipse remix)
5. Won (:10: remix)

=== Obligatory ===
Released in February 2012. Only available on iTunes.

Tracks

1. Don't Panic
2. Obligatory 2.0
3. Obligatory (DYM remix)
4. Reliance (Eric Chamberlain Remix)
5. Reliance (Red Flag Remix)

=== 11:11 ===
Released in October 2012.

1. Petals
2. Angry Tree
3. I Want Some More
4. The Sea
5. Hideaway
6. So Lost
7. Draw A House
8. Answer In My Mind
9. Reliance
10. Obligatory
11. Space

=== Reset ===
Released in March 2019.

1. World Left
2. The Puzzle
3. Sky Crane
4. Mice on a Wheel
5. Locked In
6. Stumble
7. Make Believe
8. Ella
9. Space Lights
10. Enough
11. Red Outside

Zone

Released in March 2024.

1. Crushing the Dread
2. Cut Right Through
3. Fears Float Away
4. Chasing Butterflies
5. I Should Have Known Better
6. Dead Trees
7. Moonshot
8. It's Time
9. Massive Explosions Only
10. Bye Now
