= Birmingham 6 (band) =

Danish electro-industrial/EBM group

- Also known as: 6 Incorporated
- Origin: Denmark
- Genres: EBM; electro-industrial
- Years active: 1991–1999
- Labels: Neo Ego; Transfixion; Cleopatra; Zoth Ommog
- Past members: Kim Løhde Petersen; Michael Hillerup
- Website: www.birmingham6.com

Birmingham 6 was a Danish electro-industrial/EBM group founded in 1991 and named after the Birmingham Six, a group of Irish men wrongly imprisoned for the Birmingham pub bombings. Members include Kim Løhde Petersen and Michael Hillerup.

== Themes ==
They took on the name as they focused on injustices worldwide, but particularly in western democratic society. Their lyrics have often been controversial and some radio stations have banned airplay of their songs, while other groups refused to be associated with them. Birmingham 6 has written several songs questioning governmental systems and their unwillingness to admit their own fallibility. "Israel" talks about the issues between the Palestinians and the Jews. "Contagious" discusses AIDS and "Who Do You Love?" points out the difficulty in telling good from evil. The song "6794700" describes church views on abortion they disagreed with. "Love Child" describes how the tourism agency in Thailand helps western travel agencies fulfill certain men's desire for an underage prostitute. The song "Policestate" talks about the riots in Copenhagen in 1993 during the re-voting for the European Union in which police shot into the angry mob, injuring several protesters.

== Releases ==
They released their first album, Mindhallucination in 1994. It was released in the United States in 1995 as Assassinate with a few track changes. Their next album, Error of Judgement, was released in 1996. In 1999, Resurrection, a collection of previously released tracks and two new remixes, was released. 7 tracks on the album Error of Judgement were sung by Jean-Luc de Meyer, better known as a member of Front 242.

Birmingham 6 also released a single of their cover of "Godlike" by KMFDM. Birmingham 6 covered AC/DC's "Thunderstruck" for the 1997 tribute album Covered in Black on Cleopatra records. They also covered Metallica's "Seek and Destroy" for the tribute album Tribute to... METALLICA.

== Touring ==
In 1997, they embarked on a 5-week coast to coast U.S. Tour together with Seattle act Rorschach Test. Due to poor tour organisation, vocalist and original member Kim Løhde Petersen left the band after only four shows. At the time, they were noted as being "among industrial music's most compelling bands."

Unable to perform the remaining shows on the tour without Kim, the band broke up the tour, and returned to Denmark in a state of bankruptcy.

As a tribute to the Danish Club Metropolis, Kim Løhde Petersen and Michael Hillerup reunited for one night to play live at the club's 10th anniversary party on March 7, 2003. The concert also featured Diary of Dreams.

In October 2008, Birmingham 6 performed at 12. Elektrisch Festival in Zwickau, Germany. The German label Black Rain released the live compilation 12. Electrisch Festival on 17 December 2008. This festival also featured Absolute Body Control and Tyske Ludder. The Birmingham 6 tracks featured on the live compilation are "You Cannot Walk Here" and a cover of KMFDM's "Godlike".

In March 2009, Birmingham 6 performed in Copenhagen at the "10 Years of Black Rain" show (celebrating the 10 year anniversary of the German label Black Rain) featuring Hicoctan (DE) and Feindflug (DE).

== Discography ==
=== Albums ===
- Mindhallucination (Transfixion Records)
- Assassinate (Cleopatra Records)
- Error of Judgement (Zoth Ommog Records, Cleopatra Records)
- Resurrection (COP International)

=== EPs and singles ===
- Israel (Transfixion Records)
- Contagious (Transfixion Records)
- Policestate (Cleopatra Records)
- To Protect and To Serve (Cleopatra Records)
- The Kill (Error of Judgement 12" Promo) (Zoth Ommog Records)
- You Cannot Walk Here (Zoth Ommog Records, Cleopatra Records)
- Mixed Judgements (Zoth Ommog Records)
