= C-Tec =

EBM band

- Also known as: The Cyber-Tec Project
- Origin: United Kingdom / Belgium
- Genres: Electro-industrial; EBM
- Years active: 1995–2000
- Labels: Cyber-Tec; Fifth Colvmn; Synthetic Symphony; TVT; Wax Trax!
- Spinoff of: Crisis n.T.i.; Cubanate; Front 242; New Mind
- Members: Jean-Luc De Meyer; Ged Denton; Marc Heal
- Past members: Jonathan Sharp

C-Tec (or The Cyber-Tec Project) was an EBM band originally formed as a side project in 1995 by Jean-Luc De Meyer (of Front 242), Jonathan Sharp (of New Mind), and Ged Denton (of Crisis n.T.i.). The name was taken from Cyber-Tec Records, who released the band's debut EP. Afterward, Jonathan Sharp left the band (due to problems with Cyber-Tec Records manager Paul M. Green), and Marc Heal (of Cubanate) joined as a full-time member.

== History ==
C-Tec was conceived as a one-off project, under the name The Cyber-Tec Project, but the members decided to continue producing music under the name. The concept emerged during a dormant period for Front 242 when De Meyer (the original lead singer in 242) and other members took time to work on solo and side projects.

In 1995 Synthetic Symphony released the band's debut EP Cyber-Tec, which was later reissued in the United States by Fifth Colvmn Records with an alternate track listing. The EP peaked at #7 on the CMJ RPM Chart in the U.S. In 1997, after shortening their name to C-Tec, they released a full album, Darker, on the US industrial Wax Trax! label.

The band toured early in 1996 but the American leg of the tour was cut short after playing only one show in New York City due to contract issues. The band toured North America twice in 1998 with a hybrid lineup featuring other members of Cubanate and Julian Beeston, one time drummer in Nitzer Ebb.

The second album, Cut, was released in 2000 on SPV imprint Synthetic Symphony. The album was originally slated for US release on Wax Trax! but the label closed around this time, thus, Cut never had an official American release. Cut was ranked #25 on the German Alternative Charts (DAC) Top 50 Albums of 2000.

In terms of how C-Tec sounded, Darker contains a downbeat, moody collection of songs, showing strong electronic influences but with more ambient textures than would be suggested by the industrial music backgrounds of the main participants. Cut is faster in tempo, with De Meyer’s vocal mixed low. Most of the material on the two full-length C-Tec albums was co-written by Marc Heal and Jean-Luc De Meyer.

C-Tec effectively went dormant after the release of Cut. In 2018, both "Darker" and "Cut" were remastered and re-released on UK label Armalyte Industries as Darker/Cut. C-Tec reformed for a corresponding North American tour, featuring DeMeyer, Heal, and Denton, as well as Sean Payne of Cyanotic on drums.

== Discography ==
Studio albums

- Darker (1997, Synthetic Symphony)
- Cut (2000, Synthetic Symphony)

Extended plays

- Cyber-Tec (1995, Synthetic Symphony)

Singles

- Foetal (1998, Wax Trax!/TVT)

Compilation albums

- Darker/Cut (2018, Armalyte Industries)

Compilation appearances

- Neurostyle Vol. IX (1997, Neuro Style/Sub Terranean)
- Full Tilt Volume 1: Past, Present, Future (1997, JVC)
- One Nation Under a Groove! (1997, SPV)
- We Came to Dance - Indie Dancefloor Vol. 11 (1998, Sub Terranean)
- Transmission 05. Binary Application Extension (1998, Genocide Project)
- Euphoria (1998, David Gresham)
- Body Rapture 8 (1999, Zoth Ommog)
- Kaleidoscope Issue 8 (2000, Kaleidoscope)
- Extreme Clubhits IV (2000, UpSolution)
- Numéro 8 (2000, Elegy)
- ElectroCution Version 00:01 (2000, Master Maschine)
- Sonic Seducer Cold Hands Seduction Vol. III (2000, Sonic Seducer)
- Your Gift From The Festivalsummer 2000 (2000, Synthetic Symphony)
- Music With Attitude - Volume 15 (2000, Rock Sound)
- TT 33 (2000, Text und Ton Magazin)
- EBM Club Classics Vol. 3 (2001, Synthetic Symphony)
- Make Armalyte Great Again (2018, Armalyte Industries)
- Implosion New Music Sampler Vol. 2 (1996, Neuro Style)
- Soundtrack Sampler Vol. 5 (1996, Neuro Style)
