= Dynamica =

Dynamica was a record label, founded by Jor and Anna Rosen after the success of Machinery Records specifically to release industrial metal music, hence the slogan Metal-Hacking-Industrialism.

Both labels later came under the Noise Records banner, a label of Modern Music Records, but still continued to release music under their own names. When Modern Music was acquired by the Sanctuary Records Group. the label Dynamica (and also Machinery) was officially dropped.

== Artists at Dynamica ==
- Ashtrayhead
- Coptic Rain
- Cubanate
- Oomph!
- Meathead
- Second Skin
- Templebeat
- Think About Mutation

== See also ==
- List of record labels
- Dynamica Drum Corps
