= Gran Turismo (1997 video game) =

1997 sim racing video game

- Japanese cover art featuring a Nissan Skyline GT-R (left) and a Toyota Supra (right)
- Developer: Polys Entertainment (Note: At the time a group within Sony Computer Entertainment Japan. Later called Polyphony Digital for North American releases and sequels. With assistance from Cyberhead.)
- Publisher: Sony Computer Entertainment
- Director: Kazunori Yamauchi
- Producers: Kazunori Yamauchi; Shuhei Yoshida
- Designers: Kazunori Yamauchi; Takeshi Yokouchi; Hirotaka Komiyama
- Programmer: Seiichi Ikiou
- Artist: Masaaki Goto
- Composers: Masahiro Andoh (JP); Isamu Ohira (JP); Jason Page (EU/US)
- Series: Gran Turismo
- Platform: PlayStation
- Release: JP: December 23, 1997; EU: May 8, 1998; NA: May 12, 1998
- Genre: Sim racing
- Modes: Single-player, multiplayer

Gran Turismo (Note: Japanese: グランツーリスモ, Hepburn: Guran Tsūrisumo) (Note: "Gran Turismo" is Italian for "grand touring") is a 1997 sim racing video game developed and published by Sony Computer Entertainment for the PlayStation. It was directed by Kazunori Yamauchi and produced by Shuhei Yoshida. It is the first game in the Gran Turismo series.

After five years of development time, Gran Turismo was well-received both commercially and critically, shipping a total of 10.85 million copies worldwide (making it the best-selling PlayStation game), and scoring an average of 95% in GameRankings' aggregate, making it the highest rated racing video game at the time of the site's closure in 2019. Many publications have deemed it one of the greatest video games of all time. The game has started a series, and has spawned over 10 spin-offs and sequels.

== Gameplay ==
Gameplay screenshot featuring a Mitsubishi FTO GPX on Trial Mountain Circuit

Gran Turismo is a racing game. The player must maneuver a car to compete against artificially intelligent drivers on various race tracks. It is not possible for cars to take damage in the game. Gran Turismo was the first game designed to fully support the PlayStation's DualShock controller. This includes both the analogue control and rumble support.

The game uses two different modes: Arcade Mode and Simulation Mode (Gran Turismo Mode in PAL and Japanese versions). In the arcade mode, the player can freely choose the courses and vehicles they wish to use. Winning races unlocks additional cars and courses.

However, simulation mode requires the player to earn different levels of driver's licenses in order to participate in events, and earn credits (money), trophies and prize cars by winning race championships. Winning one particular championship also unlocks a video and a few additional demonstration tracks. Credits can be used to purchase additional vehicles, and for parts and tuning.

Gran Turismo features 140 cars and 11 race tracks (as well as their reversed versions). The game features a wide variety of kinds of cars which is not typical in most racing games, as in addition to sports cars and race cars, the game also features standard commercial road cars. The game features cars from many Japanese automakers, such as Nissan, Mitsubishi, Toyota, Honda, and Mazda. Two Honda NSX cars from 1992 were included in the Japanese version, but were removed from the North American and European versions. There is also a 1967 Chevrolet Corvette and a 1998 Mazda Roadster exclusive to the Arcade mode.

== Development and release ==
The game took five years to complete with a development budget of $5 million. The development personnel were largely the same team which was behind the earlier PlayStation racers Motor Toon Grand Prix and Motor Toon Grand Prix 2, and Gran Turismo uses parts of the Motor Toon game engine, such as the physics model. Kazunori Yamauchi said that the development of Gran Turismo started in the second half of 1992. Yamauchi added that at different times only seven to fifteen people were assisting him. Since Motor Toon Grand Prix 2 was still in development when work on Gran Turismo started, several people only joined the development team after the completion of Motor Toon Grand Prix 2 freed them up to work on Gran Turismo. Shuhei Yoshida, at the time head of Japan Studio, was the producer of the game.

When asked how difficult it was to create Gran Turismo, Yamauchi remarked: "It took five years. In those five years, we could not see the end. I would wake up at work, go to sleep at work. It was getting cold, so I knew it must be winter. I estimate I was home only four days a year." While the team used standard PlayStation libraries in part, to get the game to run at optimal speed they had to use assembly code, and even then, they found the limitations of the PlayStation's CPU would not allow them to meet their initial goal of having 12 cars in each race. Sound design was one aspect that Yamauchi believed was compromised due to a lack of time. Although Kazunori considered the game's artificial intelligence to be superior to its competitors, he remained unsatisfied with its development.

At the time of Gran Turismo's Japanese release on December 23, 1997, Polys Entertainment was still a development group within Sony Computer Entertainment's internal development team. The studio was reestablished as Polyphony Digital in April 1998, before the Western release of the game. Yamauchi estimated that Gran Turismo utilized around 75% of the PlayStation's maximum performance.

Gran Turismo was released in Europe on May 8, 1998, and in North America on May 12. The PAL and NTSC versions of Gran Turismo notably contain a soundtrack which features major label artists: Garbage, Manic Street Preachers (with a song remixed by The Chemical Brothers), Ash, Cubanate, Feeder (on PAL versions only), and TMF (on NTSC versions only). Additionally, a companion soundtrack album was released by the major label EMI in late 1998. It featured a few of the in-game songs, along with other artists that did not appear in the game, such as David Bowie, Blur, Placebo, Terrorvision, The Dandy Warhols, among others. From March to May 1999, the game was one of five involved in the "Gimme Five" promotion, a campaign by Sony and General Mills that distributed $5 discount coupons toward select PlayStation titles through six leading General Mills breakfast cereals.

== Reception ==
=== Commercial ===
Gran Turismo was a commercial hit. In May 1998, Sony awarded Gran Turismo a "Double Platinum Prize" for sales above 2 million units in Japan alone. In its first month on the Japanese market, it sold over 1 million copies, making it the best-selling video game of the 1997 holiday shopping season in Japan. According to Weekly Famitsu, it sold an additional 1.34 million units during the first half of 1998, which made it Japan's second-best selling game for that period. Overall in 1998, it ranked third in the best-selling video games of that year in the country, only behind Pokémon and Resident Evil 2.

In its first month of release in the United States, Gran Turismo was the second best-selling home console game, behind Tekken 3. It was one of the best-selling PlayStation games of 1998 with 1,431,483 sales and $58,568,520 (equivalent to $115,690,166 in 2025) revenue; according to the NPD Group, it was the third best-selling video game of 1998 by unit sales, behind GoldenEye 007 and The Legend of Zelda: Ocarina of Time. It was the best-selling PlayStation game of 1999 in the United States, where it sold 1.3 million units and grossed an estimated $35,000,000 (equivalent to $68,000,000 in 2025) that year, adding up to 2,731,483 sales and about $62,000,000 (equivalent to $122,000,000 in 2025) revenue in the United States by 1999.

It was also a high-seller in Australia, selling over 100,000 units in the first two months and with sales exceeding 130,000 by October 1998. It received a "Gold" award from the Verband der Unterhaltungssoftware Deutschland (VUD) in August 1998, for sales of at least 100,000 units across Germany, Austria and Switzerland. It sold 270,000 units in the German market from January through September 1998, which made it the region's best-selling console game of the period across all systems. The VUD raised it to "Platinum" status, indicating 200,000 sales, by November. At the 1999 Milia festival in Cannes, it took home a "Platinum" prize for revenues above €66 million or $74,000,000 (equivalent to $150,000,000 in 2025) in the European Union during 1998. This made it Europe's second-highest-grossing game of the year, behind Tomb Raider III. It was again Europe's second highest-grossing game of 1999 with €94.444 million or $100,658,000 (equivalent to $195,000,000 in 2025) grossed that year, adding up to over €160.444 million or $175,658,000 (equivalent to $347,000,000 in 2025) grossed in Europe by 1999, and over $238,000,000 (equivalent to $470,000,000 in 2025) across Europe and the United States by 1999.

By March 1999, Gran Turismo had sold over six million units worldwide, of which two million were derived from the United States. By February 2000, it had sold 7 million units worldwide, for which it was awarded the Guinness World Record for Best-Selling Driving Simulator. By December 2000, it had sold more than 10 million copies worldwide, including 3.7 million units in the United States. As of April 2008, the game has shipped 2.55 million copies in Japan, 10,000 in Southeast Asia, 4.3 million in Europe, and 3.99 million in North America, for a total of 10.85 million copies. It remains the best-selling video game for the PlayStation and the fifth highest-selling game in the Gran Turismo franchise, behind Gran Turismo 4, Gran Turismo 5, Gran Turismo Sport and Gran Turismo 3: A-Spec respectively.

=== Critical ===
Reception

Aggregate score
Aggregator	Score
Metacritic	96/100

Review scores
Publication	Score
AllGame	5/5
Computer and Video Games	9/10
Edge	10/10
Electronic Gaming Monthly	9.5/10, 9.5/10, 9/10, 9/10
Famitsu	9/10, 9/10, 9/10, 8/10
Game Informer	9.5/10
GameRevolution	A
GameSpot	8.6/10
Hyper	92%
IGN	9.5/10
Next Generation	5/5
PlayStation Official Magazine – UK	10/10
Official U.S. PlayStation Magazine	5/5
Entertainment Weekly	A−

Awards
Publication	Award
Spotlight Awards (1999)	Best Simulation
Official UK PlayStation Magazine	Perfect 10
Academy of Interactive Arts & Sciences	Console Racing Game of the Year
MobyGames	Game of the Year

Gran Turismo received widespread acclaim, with praise for its graphics, sophisticated and believable physics, tight controls, and number of cars; GamePro commented it has "more cars than a mall parking lot." It was classified as "universal acclaim" by review aggregator website Metacritic.

A number of critics gave particular praise to the replay mode, lauding the usage of multiple camera views and likening the quality to live action video. The ability to upgrade and customize cars in a variety of ways was also widely applauded, with some noting this allows the player to build a car that fits their own particular playstyle and compensates for their own weaknesses. Dean Hager of Electronic Gaming Monthly (EGM) and Vince Broady of GameSpot both particularly noted Gran Turismo's successful blend of arcade-style and simulation racing, with Broady commenting, "Some players enjoy the raw excitement and unfettered control of an action-oriented contest, while others go gaga over the realistic physics and heavy-duty customization features of a sim-style game. Rare indeed, almost nonexistent, is a racer that has a legitimate appeal to both camps, a game that blends the elements of action and sim in such a subtle manner that something altogether new is the result."

Next Generation stated that "as it stands in the Japanese version, everything about Gran Turismo is a class act, and it raises the bar for racing games on almost every possible level. Our highest possible recommendation." Reviewing the U.S. release, John Ricciardi and Kraig Kujawa of EGM criticized that it retained the Japanese names and likenesses for many of the cars instead of using the American versions, but were just as enthusiastic about the game as a whole, commenting, "Get used to this quote, 'cause you're gonna hear it a lot: Gran Turismo is the best racing game of all time." Hager and GamePro were less certain of this claim, opining that Gran Turismo contemporary Need for Speed III was at least a viable competitor. IGN described it as the best racing game to date, and especially praised how the game's physics cause cars to react to the environment and the driving in a realistic manner.

The one significant criticism voiced against Gran Turismo was that the licensing procedure is excessively drawn-out and difficult. Broady particularly criticized that passing a licensing exam can be more difficult than winning the race which that license unlocks.

Gran Turismo won "Console Racing Game of the Year" at the 2nd Annual Interactive Achievement Awards (now known as the D.I.C.E. Awards), won "Best Simulation" of 1999 at the Spotlight Awards, won "Best Driving Game" and "Best Graphics" of 1999 according to the staff of PlayStation Official Magazine, and was voted the sixth best game of all time by the magazine's readers in the same issue. At the 1999 edition of the Milia D’Or Awards in Cannes, Gran Turismo won in the "Racing Game" category. In 2000, readers of Computer and Video Games voted it the eighth best video game of all time. Game Informer ranked it the 21st best video game ever made in 2001. The staff felt that the racing genre had not offered as "complete [a] package" as Gran Turismo. In 2017, Gran Turismo was declared the best driving game ever by Top Gear.

In 1999, Next Generation listed Gran Turismo as number 15 on their "Top 50 Games of All Time", commenting that, "Gran Turismo features cars that handle better than any other racing game ever made". In 2006, Gran Turismo was inducted into GameSpot's list of the greatest games of all time. In 2015, IGN listed Gran Turismo as the second most influential racing game of all time (after Pole Position), calling it "the grandfather of all modern console racing sims."
