= Julian Beeston =

English electronic musician

- Origin: England, United Kingdom
- Genres: Electronic; Industrial
- Occupations: Musician; record producer; composer; remixer
- Instruments: keyboards, samplers, drum machines, programming
- Years active: 1989–present
- Formerly of: Nitzer Ebb; Cubanate
- Website: julianbeeston.com

Julian Beeston is an English musician, mainly noted for his time in the electronic groups Nitzer Ebb and Cubanate.

== History ==
Julian Beeston was a member of the industrial band Nitzer Ebb from 1989 to 1992. He appeared on their 1991 album Ebbhead. After his departure from Nitzer Ebb, Beeston joined Cubanate. He was in the band from 1993 to 1994, and again from 1999 to 2000, although he never appeared on any of their studio releases; however, a few of his remixes appeared either as bonus tracks on the albums or on various singles. In the following years, he has spent time as a remixing engineer working on artists such as Bob Marley and Billy Idol. He has also worked as a composer and producer, making music for TV commercials for companies such as Mitsubishi and Ford and has produced trailers for Universal, Miramax and 20th Century Fox.

=== Featured ===
In 2020, he launched a new project called Featured and released "We The People" EP. In 2021, he released "Girly," which features his own vocals but also vocals from several female vocalists in the industrial and alternative underground scene.

In 2023, he released Dicks Incorporated, which features Steve White (PIG, KMFDM) on guitar and Dean Garcia (Curve, SPC-ECO) on bass and features Chelsea Dawn on vocals.

In 2023, as part of Featured, he teamed up with KMFDM vocalist Lucia Cifarelli to release the single "Medusa."

In January 2025, he released a Featured compilation called ‘All Mouth and No Trousers’ to support LA animal shelters amid 2025 fires.The album includes tracks from such artists as Mari Kattman, BARA HARI, Whitney Tai, Mia FluxXx, Rose Berlin, Lucia Cifarelli and more.

== Discography ==
=== as Shining ===
- Din (1995)
- Dinmix (1997)

=== as Featured ===
==== Albums ====
- We the People EP (2020)
- Girly (2021)
- All Mouth and No Trousers (2023)

==== Singles ====
- Dicks Incorporated (2022)
- Medusa (Feat.Lucia Cifarelli) (2023)
