= Marc Heal =

British musician

Marc Heal is an English musician, television producer and writer. He is best known as an industrial music artist of the 1990s, noted for mixing metal and techno with more traditional industrial sounds. His extroverted onstage behaviour was unusual in the generally downbeat industrial genre.

His most influential project was Cubanate, founded 1992 with Graham Rayner, Phil Barry and Steve Etheridge. Cubanate produced four studio albums. Their final album release, Interference, came out in 1998. They reformed in 2010, and released a re-mastered greatest hits album, Brutalism, in 2017. After performing several live dates again, they released the live album Live Brutalism in 2018, followed by the EP Kolossus in 2019 featuring new and remixed material.

== Career ==
Heal first surfaced supporting Gary Numan in 1987 with Westwon. Later, signed with Cubanate to legendary Chicago industrial label Wax Trax!, he also participated in several side projects like C-Tec (with Jean-Luc De Meyer from Front 242), and Ashtrayhead (with former Westwon guitarist Si Rapley). During the 1990s he was also involved in game music with contributions to Command & Conquer, Wing Commander: Prophecy and the best-selling Sony PlayStation console game Gran Turismo. His music has appeared in The Sopranos and Mortal Kombat. Heal has also collaborated with Martin Atkins, Rhys Fulber, Doug Martin, Julian Beeston (ex -Nitzer Ebb), Cobalt 60, and KMFDM. His other music production credits include the first single ("Thumper", 2000) for UK metallers Raging Speedhorn. Heal was also a collaborator on Raymond Watts' Pigmartyr album (2004) and was credited on indie – pop act Rubicks "I See You" release – an NME Single of the Week in November 2004.

After a 15-year gap, in April 2015, Heal released the Compound Eye Sessions EP on Armalyte Industries, a joint production with long time collaborator Raymond Watts (a.k.a. PIG). The EP credited Heal as "MC Lord of the Flies". After the end of Cubanate and the final C-Tec album in 2000, Heal had retired from public performance. His last live appearance was a European tour with Fear Factory in 1999. However, on 26 September 2016, he appeared live with Cubanate at the Chicago Cold Waves festival.

A new solo single titled "Adult Fiction" was released on Armalyte on 6 October 2016, followed by an album titled The Hum on 11 November 2016.

A book by Marc Heal titled The Sussex Devils was published by Unbound in October 2015 and distributed by Penguin Random House. Heal now lives in Singapore. He has worked in television and is credited as the Executive Producer of the 2013 BBC World News documentary Changing Fortunes.

== Personal life ==
Heal studied politics at the University of Leicester, where he also edited the student newspaper The Ripple between 1983 and 1984.

== Bibliography ==
- Heal, Marc (2015). The Sussex Devils: A True Story of the 1980s Satanic Panic. London: Unbound. ISBN 978-1-78352-127-2.
