= Crisis n.T.i. =

1995–1999 music project by Ged Denton

- Also known as: Crisis
- Origin: Cumbria, England
- Genres: EBM; industrial
- Years active: 1995–1999
- Label: Fifth Colvmn
- Past members: Ged Denton

Crisis n.T.i. was the music project of United Kingdom-based composer Ged Denton, known for his work in The Cyber-Tec Project. Under the moniker Denton released the album The Alien Conspiracy for Fifth Colvmn Records in 1995.

== History ==
Crisis n.T.i. was founded in 1995 out of Cumbria as a solo outlet for composer Ged Denton's compositions. That year Genton released The Alien Conspiracy on Fifth Colvmn Records. The album combines EBM with dark ambient and industrial programming. The music's concept is about the media's coverage of close encounters. Crisis n.T.i.'s debut was reissued by Fifth Colvmn Records on October 17, 1995.

== Discography ==
Studio albums

- The Alien Conspiracy (1995, Fifth Colvmn)

Compilation appearances

- Cyber-Tec America (1995, Invisible)
- Fuckin' Hardfloor Volumes 1+2 (1995, Atomic)
- Sound-Line Vol. 3 (1996, Side-Line)
- Untitled (1996, Infected/Cyber-Tec)
- Neurostyle Vol. IV (1996, Neuro Style)
- Sacrilege: A Tribute to Front 242 (1999, Cleopatra)
