= Jean-Luc De Meyer =

Belgian electronic music vocalist

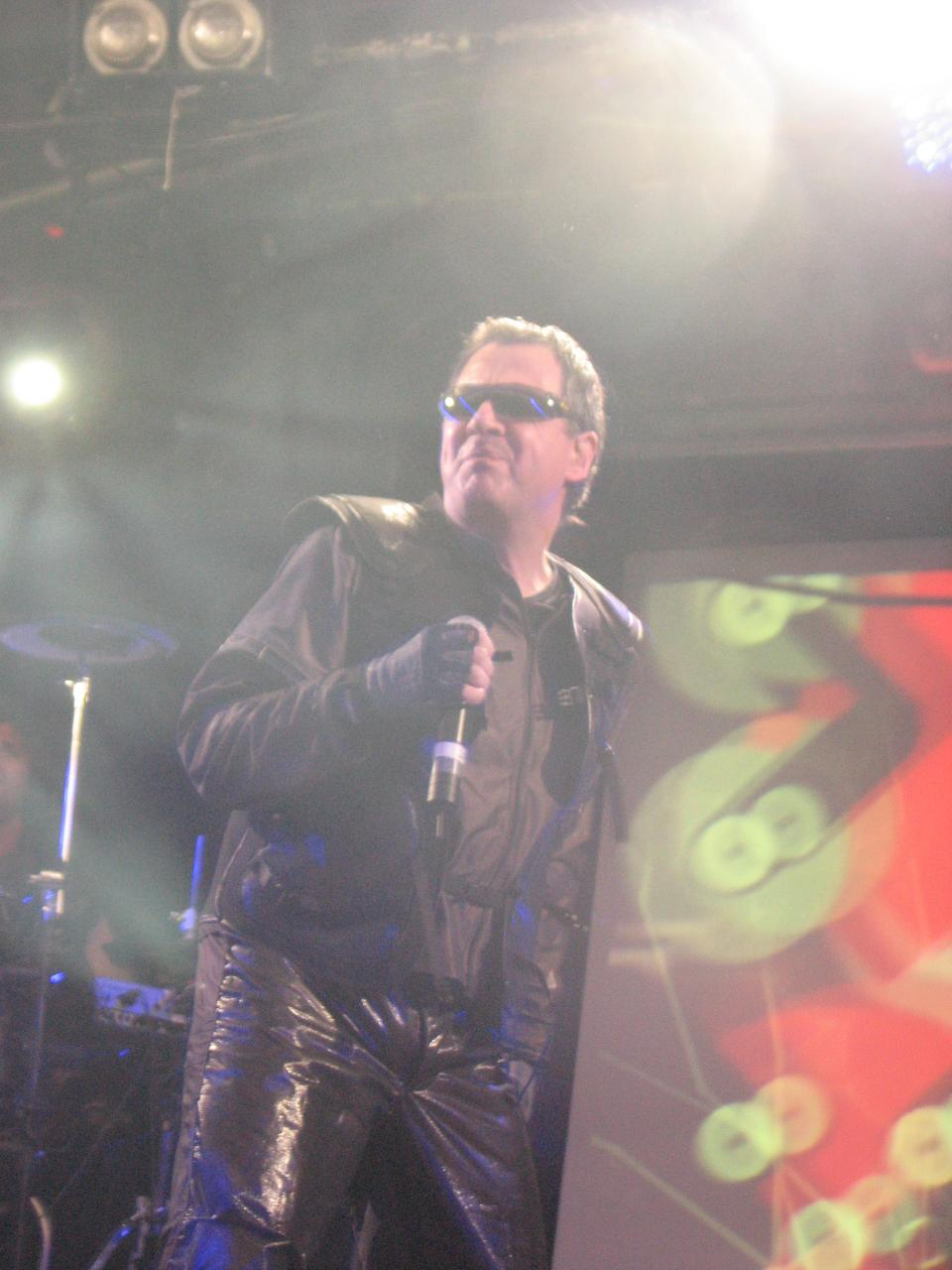

Background information
- Born: 1957 (age 68–69); Brussels, Belgium
- Genres: EBM; industrial; electronic; techno
- Occupations: Singer, lyricist, keyboards, synthesizer
- Years active: 1981–present
- Member of: Front 242
- Formerly of: Cobalt 60, C-Tec

Jean-Luc De Meyer (born 1957 in Brussels) is a vocalist and lyricist who is best known as the lead vocalist of the Belgian EBM group Front 242.

De Meyer started singing in the experimental group "Under Viewer" with Patrick Codenys. Both joined Front 242 early in their history and de Meyer's distinctive growl became part of the group's trademark sound as their reputation grew during the late 1980s. By the early 1990s the Front 242 formula seemed to be tiring and there were growing musical differences within the group. In 1994 the band went on hiatus while de Meyer and other members started to focus on side projects. The most prominent of these was Cyber-Tec Project, later known as C-Tec. C-Tec produced two albums before going dormant towards the end of the 1990s, whilst his other project Cobalt 60 was more coolly received.

De Meyer rejoined a rejuvenated Front 242 in 1998 to compose radically reworked versions of many of their songs, which they then performed on their first tour in five years, appropriately called the Re:Boot tour.

De Meyer also performed vocals with Bigod 20 on their single "The Bog", with Birmingham 6 on their album "Error of Judgment", and with Glis on their album "Nemesis". In 2006 he contributed the vocals to the song "Future Fail" of the Front Line Assembly album "Artificial Soldier" and guest vocals on the songs "The Creature" and "The Dive" of the Implant albums "Audio Blender" and "Implantology". Since 2006, he started 2 new bands: 32CRASH (with the members of Implant) and Modern Cubism, where he sings poems by Charles Baudelaire and Geo Norge.

He published a book in French in 2008, "Tous contraints", and started appearing on stage for performances as a reader and humorist.

In 2010 he collaborated with Psy'Aviah on the track Ophélie, released on the album Eclectric. In the track Jean-Luc is singing verses taken out of the poem with the same name from Arthur Rimbaud.

On 28 October 2011, his side project with members of Implant, 32CRASH released their second album y2112y on Alfa Matrix.
