= Suzi Smith =

Suzi Smith may refer to:

- Suzi Smith (volleyball) (born 1962), Canadian volleyball player
- Suzi Q. Smith, American artist, activist, and educator

== See also ==
- Suzanne Smith (disambiguation)
