= Suzanne Smith =

Suzanne Smith may refer to:

- Suzi Smith (volleyball) (born 1962), Canadian volleyball player
- Suzi Q. Smith, American artist, activist, and educator
- Suzanne Weaver Smith, American mechanical and aerospace engineer
- Suzanne Smith (politician), American politician

== See also ==
- Sue Smith (disambiguation)
- Susan Smith (disambiguation)
