= American Quartet =

American Quartet may refer to:

- American Quartet (novel), a mystery novel by Warren Adler
- String Quartet No. 12 (Dvořák) by Antonín Dvořák, nicknamed the American Quartet
- American Quartet (ensemble), a vocal group that recorded from 1899 to 1925
- A band led by jazz pianist Keith Jarrett in the 1970s

Also:

- The American Quartette, a 1920s vocal quartet
