= Eclectric (Psy'Aviah album) =

Studio album by Psy'Aviah
- Released: May 19, 2010
- Genre: Electronica, Pop, Industrial, EBM
- Length: 62:07
- Label: Alfa Matrix
- Producer: Yves Schelpe

Psy'Aviah chronology
Entertainment Industries (2008)	Eclectric (2010)

Eclectric is the third album by Psy'Aviah released May 19, 2010 by Alfa Matrix. A 2-disc limited edition was also made available under the title Eclectricism.

== Reviews ==
Professional ratings
Review scores
Source	Rating
Side-Line	8/9 stars
Mindview	5/7 stars

The German Sonic Seducer magazine noted a soft melancholy in some songs and lauded the album's diversity "beyond trodden paths of EBM". Side-Line called it "remarkably crafted" and also marked the diversity of influences. The Belgian Mindview magazine compared Emélie Nicolaï's singing to Anne Clark. Softsynth music blog declared it their best pick so far for 2010. Australian electronic music magazine Cyclic Defrost compared vocalist Emélie Nicolaï to Stieg Larsson's fictional character Lisbeth Salander for her attitude and looks.

== Track listing ==
No.	Title	Length
1.	"No Excuse"	4:34
2.	"Keep Hope Alive"	3:46
3.	"AllAboutYou"	3:33
4.	"Something Evil"	4:31
5.	"Anger Management"	4:32
6.	"Attract/Reject"	4:06
7.	"Paranoid"	4:45
8.	"Blackhole"	5:16
9.	"Ophélie" (featuring Jean-Luc De Meyer)	4:05
10.	"Sweet Hard Revenge"	4:57
11.	"Into The Game" (featuring Ayria)	3:31
12.	"Twisted Mind"	3:57
13.	"Fear (Theory)"	2:31
14.	"Fear (Practice)"	4:50
15.	"Rivotnl Nights"	3:12

== Personnel ==
- Yves Schelpe – keyboards, vocals, producer, programming, vocal arrangement, sound engineering, mixing
- Emélie Nicolaï – vocals, vocal arrangement, art direction, design, photography, collages
- Kristof De Clerck – guitar (tracks 4, 5, 6)
- Geert de Wilde – sound engineering, mastering
