= Helen Potter =

Late-19th-century American performer

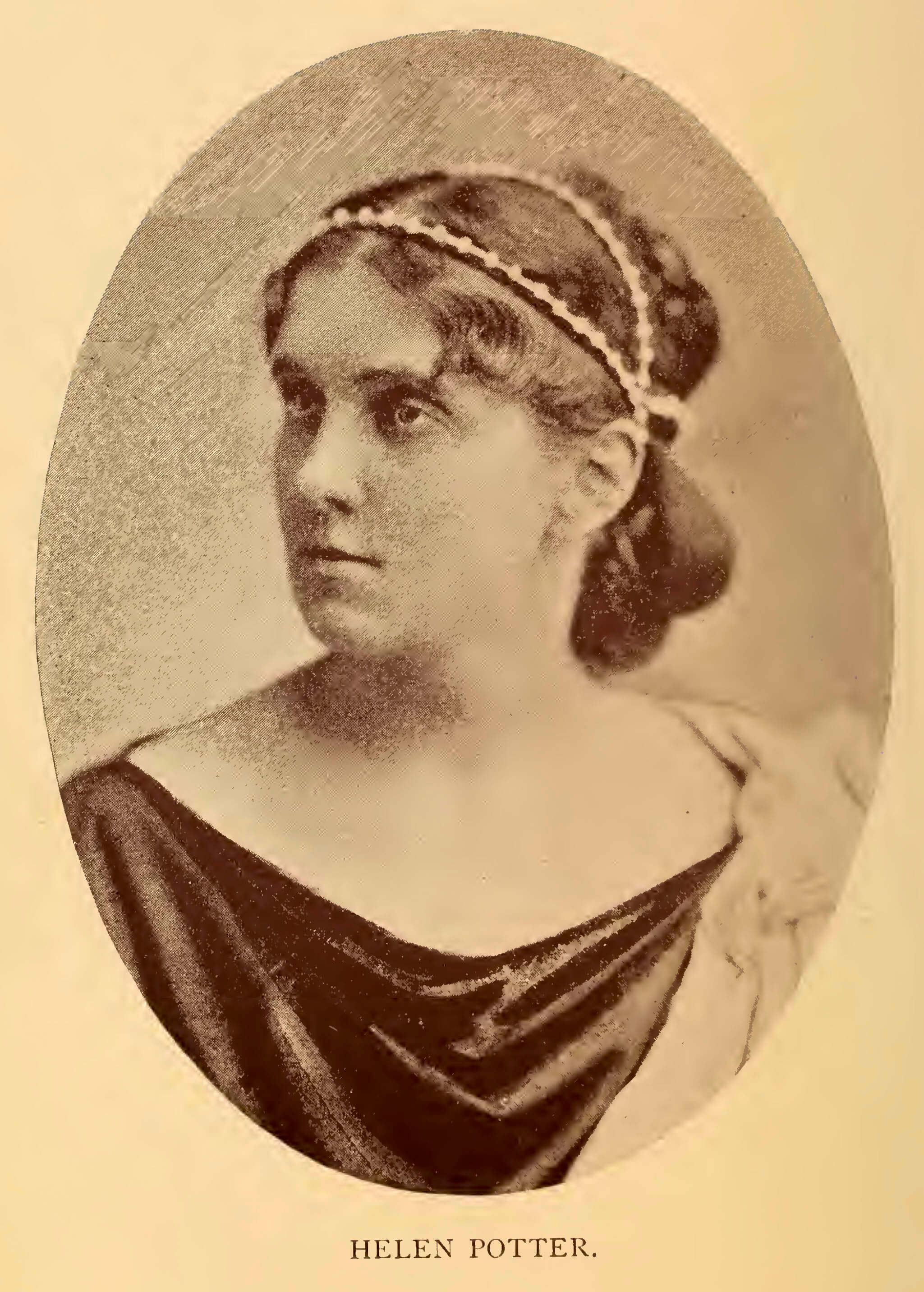
Potter's portrait in the 1891 book, Helen Potter's Impersonations

Helen Potter was a performer, platform reader, and impersonator closely associated with the Lyceum circuit and the New York Chautauqua in particular. Her performance career with the two institutions spanned the 1870s and 1880s, before she retired in 1890. Potter's impersonations, while preceded by the likes of Fanny Kemble and Mary Scott-Siddons, serves as direct inspiration for actors such as Hal Holbrook and Emlyn Williams. Potter is most well known for her impersonations "of well-known actors and lecturers, giving extracts from their principal plays or lectures". famously of Susan B. Anthony, John B. Gough, and Abraham Lincoln.

Potter was noted for her talent of being able to accurately impersonate both men and women, and for the theatrical nature of her impersonations when compared to the less flavorful performances which generally permeated the Lyceum and the Chautauqua circuits.

== Career ==
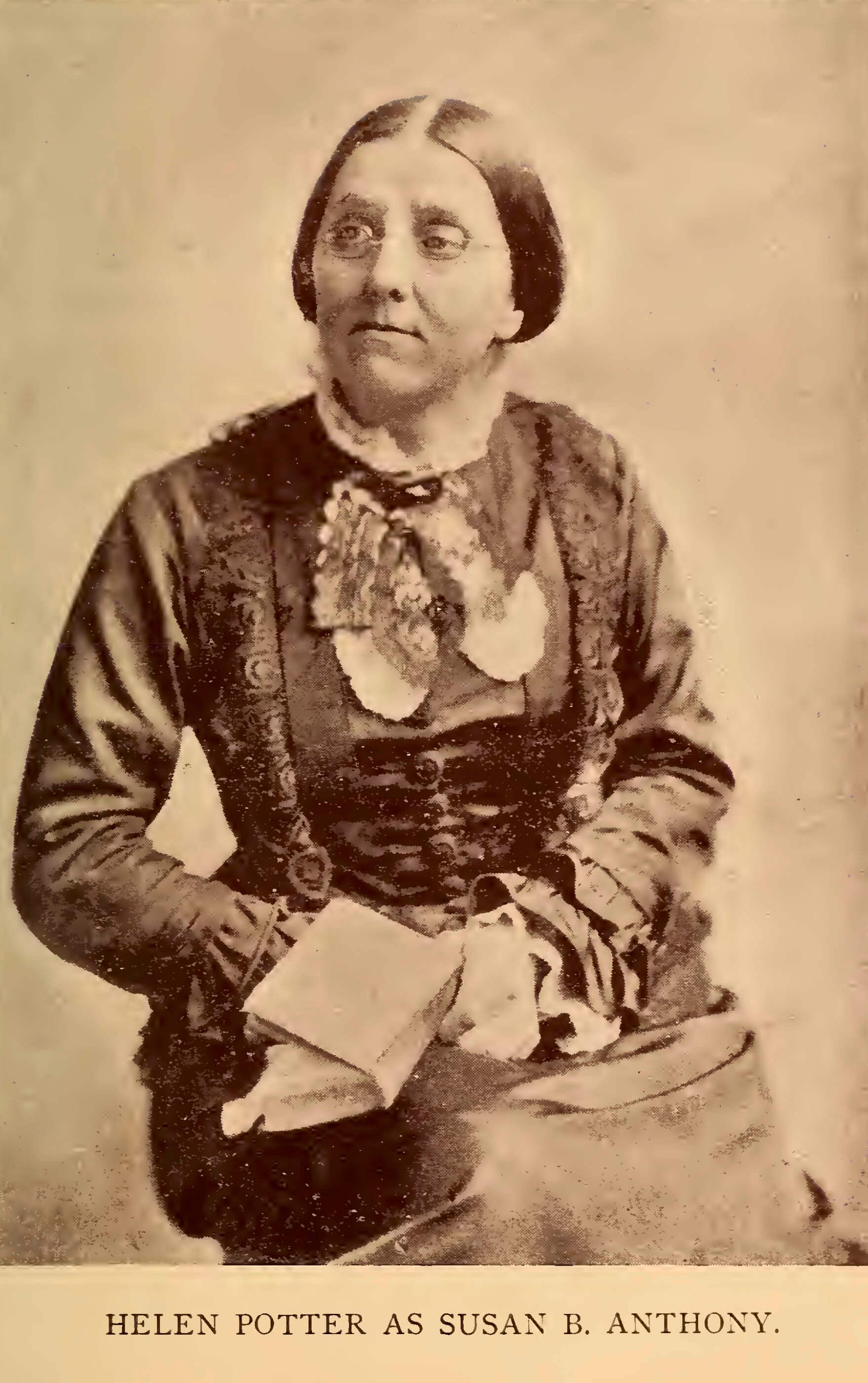
Potter impersonating Susan B. Anthony

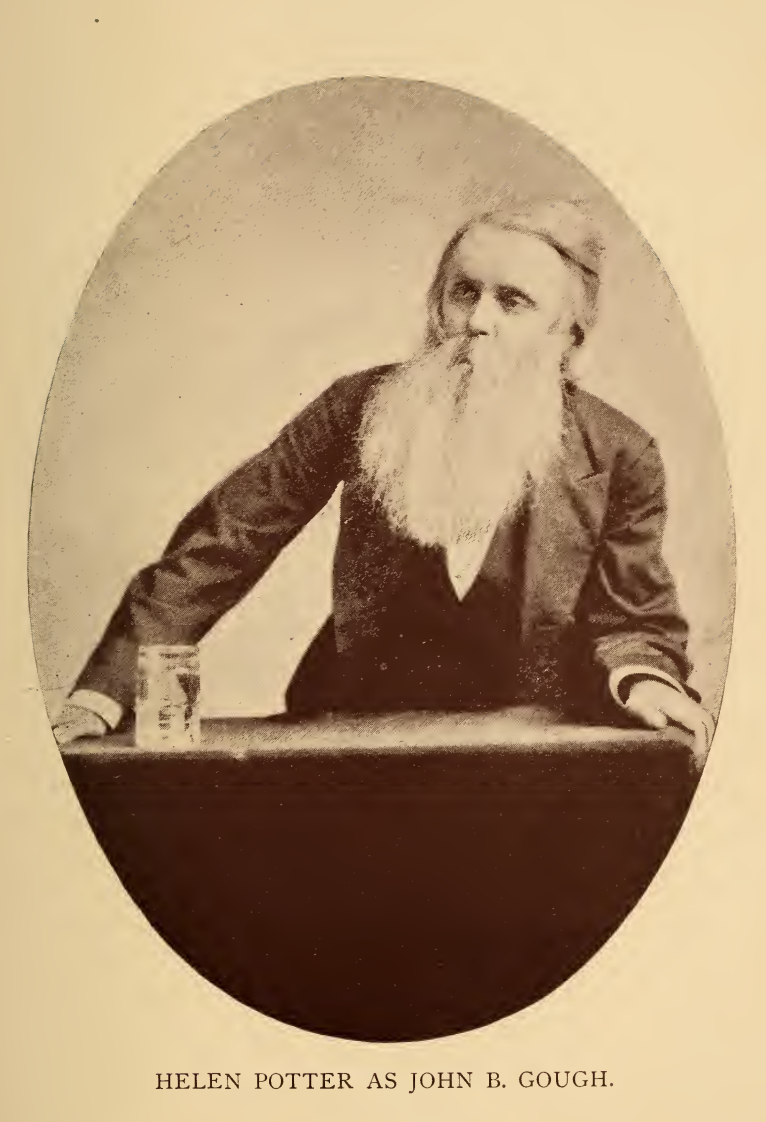
Potter impersonating John Bartholomew Gough

Potter began her platform career as a reader, until, under the advisement of James Redpath, she began to do impersonations. In 1873, Potter studied at the Normal Art Training School in Boston. While there, Redpath called on her to recite for him. Years later, an account of the conversation was published in Talent after Potter had become famous.

"'No one wants readings or recitations,' [said Redpath] "but if some one could give what I call 'ten lectures in one,'--that is, take a ten-minute extract from the text of ten of our best lectures and give it one evening-- it would make a hit. I have proposed it to several readers, but none of them seem to be able to 'catch on.'"

"Nothing further was said on the subject, but Miss Potter "caught on" immediately. The suggestion opened up great possibilities to her. ... It was presently borne in upon her that to give accurate imitations in costume of the people whose text she used would give added force to its presentation."

Although Potter was noted for her theatricality, critics made a clear distinction between Potter's performances and the impersonations of vaudeville. Potter impersonated men as well as women, including Oscar Wilde, whom she described as "having brought some good ideas to this country." Her performance of noted temperance orator John Bartholomew Gough was crafted to avoid offense:

In response to one of the most hearty encores of the evening the speaker stepped to the front of the platform to acknowledge the applause. The mystery was solved, there, bowing to the right and left, stood what appeared to be John B. Gough. There was the coat, vest, grey hair and beard, while from the waist down was the figure of a woman in plain black skirt, which the reading desk and a cleverly contrived curtain extended from the desk to the side of the platform concealed, until the close of the personation. By this means Miss Potter avoids the indelicacy of wearing the entire male costume without marring the effect.
