= Lecture circuit =

The "lecture circuit" is a euphemistic reference to a planned schedule of regular lectures and keynote speeches given by celebrities, often ex-politicians, for which they receive an appearance fee. In Western countries, the lecture circuit has become a way for ex-politicians to earn an income after leaving office or to raise money and their public profile in advance of a run for higher office. The Oxford Dictionary defines the term simply as, "A regular itinerary of venues or events for touring lecturers or public speakers".

In the United States, the modern lecture circuit was preceded by the Lyceum movement, popular during the 19th century. It encouraged local organisations and institutions to sponsor lectures, debates and instructional talks as a form of adult education and entertainment. The subsequent 20th century formalisation of the lecture circuit as a genuine and accepted vocation has led to the establishment of agencies and the employment of agents dedicated to identifying and filling lucrative speaking engagements; creating a specific media market where speakers are able to put their message to an audience uninterrupted and without challenge.

== Examples ==
In an article about the lucrative nature of the Canadian lecture circuit, National Post columnist Tristin Hopper noted;

Liberal leader Justin Trudeau was assailed in the House of Commons for skipping work to deliver speaking gigs, CBC anchor Peter Mansbridge had to answer questions about giving a paid speech to the oil lobby and CBC host Amanda Lang has been accused of getting too cozy with RBC after the bank paid her to give speeches.

Having stepped down as United States Secretary of State in 2013, Hillary Clinton has received more than $200,000, in some instances, to deliver lectures to industry associations, universities and other groups. She delivered 14 such speeches in the five months after leaving office.

While still a Member of Parliament, former UK Prime Minister Gordon Brown has declared significant income from the lecture circuit. Former Prime Minister Tony Blair, too, is said to have declared approximately £12 million in lecture circuit income per year since leaving office, receiving almost £400,000, in one instance, for two half-hour speeches in the Philippines.

== In popular culture ==
- In the television series The West Wing, Alan Alda's character Arnold Vinick is urged to go on the lecture circuit after his unsuccessful campaign for the office of President of the United States in order to maintain the lifestyle to which he had become accustomed as a member of the United States Senate.
- The US version of the television series The Office includes a two-part episode titled "Lecture Circuit."

== See also ==
- Josiah Holbrook
- Lyceum movement
- Chautauqua
