= Poet Laureate of Colorado =

Official poet of the U.S. state of Colorado

- Incumbent; Crisosto Apache since 2026
- Type: Poet Laureate
- Formation: 1919
- First holder: Alice Polk Hill

The poet laureate of Colorado is the official poet of the U.S. state of Colorado. Colorado poets laureate are appointed to four-year terms. They are nominated by Colorado Creative Industries and Colorado Humanities & Center for the Book, and chosen by the governor. The State of Colorado also appointed singer/songwriter John Denver in 1974.

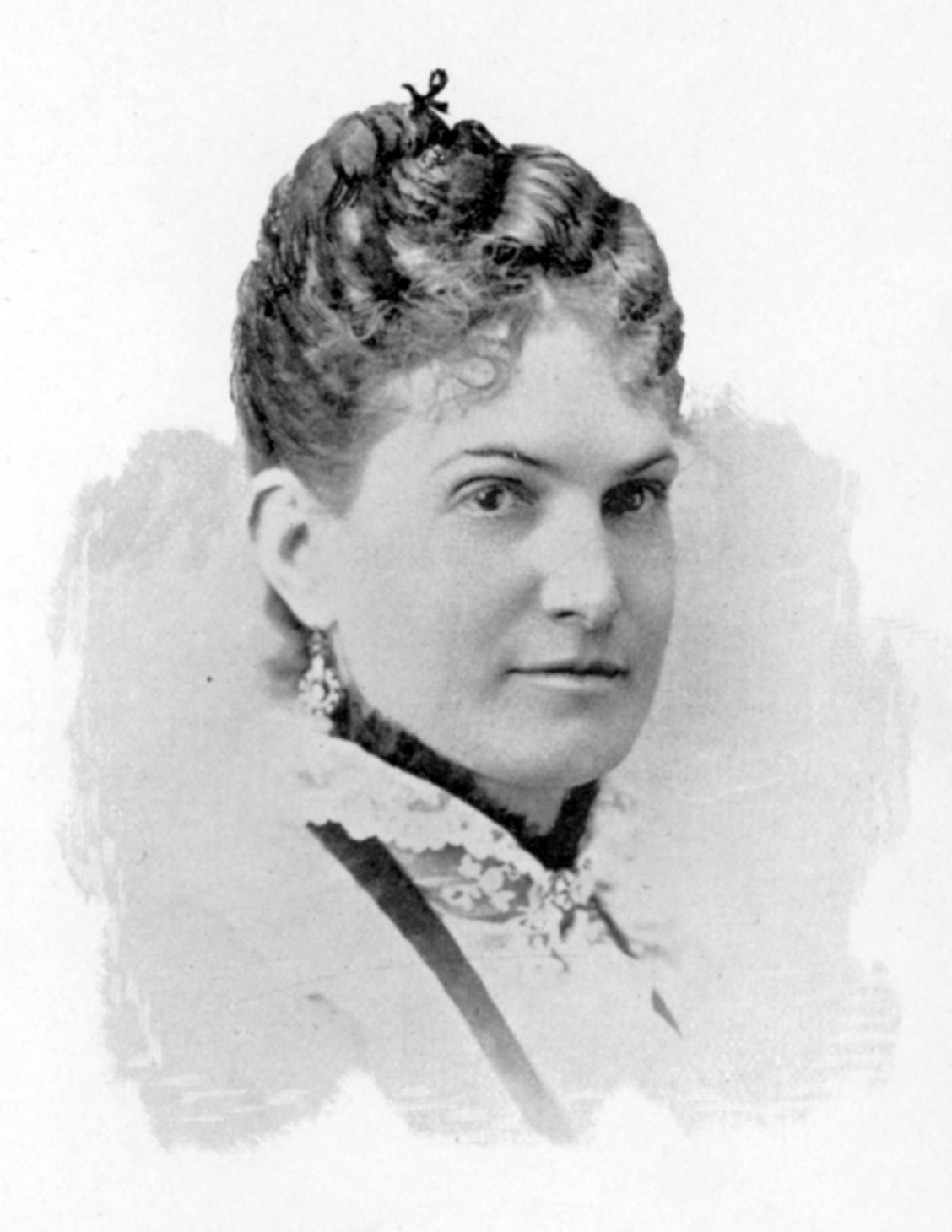
Alice Polk Hill was the first poet laureate.

== List of poets laureate ==
The following have held the position:

- Alice Polk Hill (1919–1921)
- Nellie Burget Miller (1923–1952)
- Margaret Clyde Robertson (1952–1954)
- Milford E. Shields (1954–1975)
- Thomas Hornsby Ferril (1979–1988)
- Mary Crow (1996–2010)
- David Mason (2010–2014)
- Joseph Hutchison (2014–2019)
- Bobby LeFebre (2019–2023)
- Andrea Gibson (2023–2025)
- Crisosto Apache (2026-2028)

== Anthology ==
In 2025, the University Press of Colorado will publish an anthology of poetry from all of the poets who have held the title of Colorado Poet Laureate. The book is titled Begin Where You Are: The Colorado Poets Laureate Anthology.

== See also ==
- Poet laureate
- List of U.S. state poets laureate
- United States Poet Laureate
