= Bobby LeFebre =

American poet

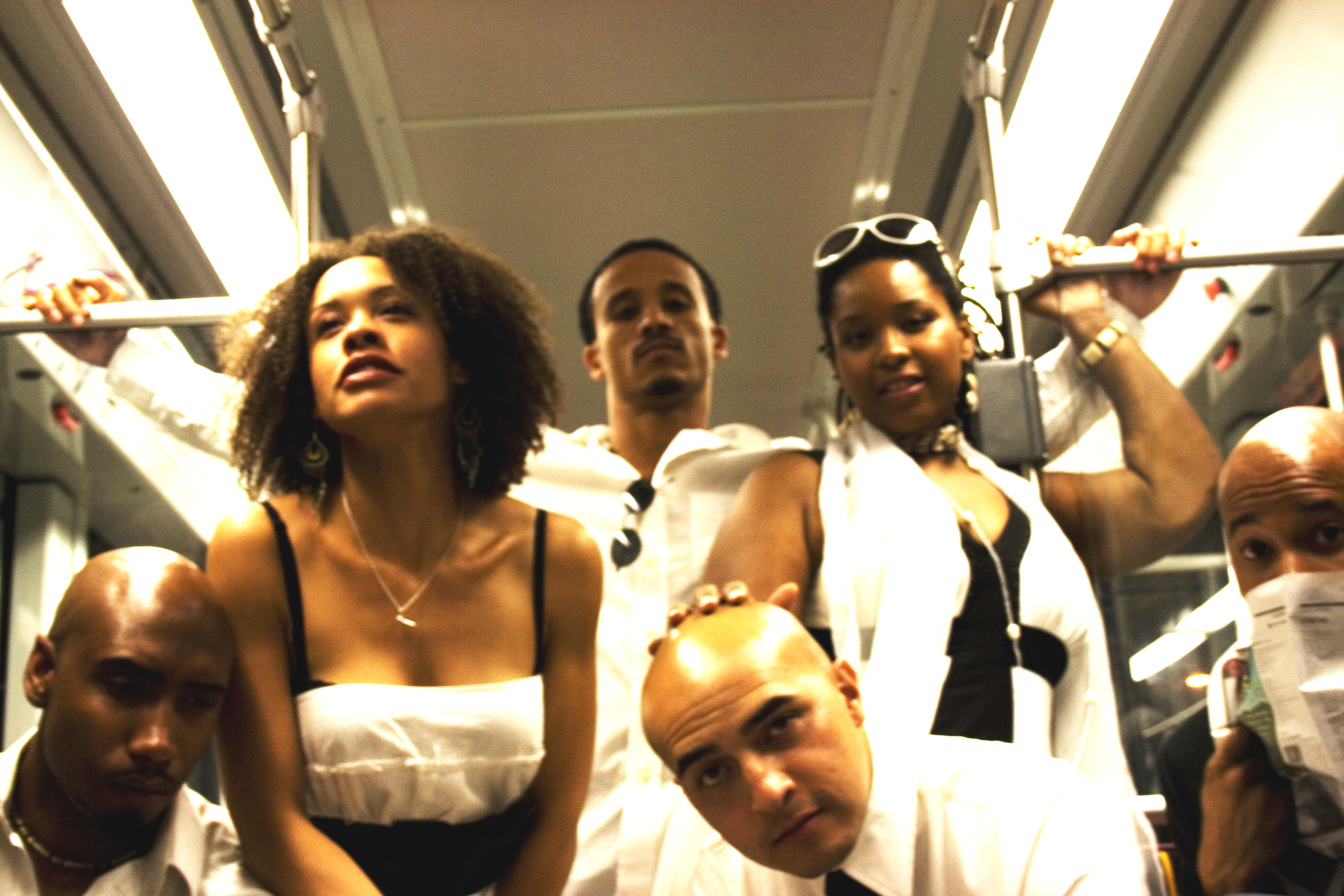
- Slam Nuba team
- Born: 1982 (age 43–44); Denver, Colorado
- Occupation: Poet

Bobby LeFebre (born 1982) is an American poet, performer, and cultural worker. He was the Poet Laureate of Colorado from 2019 to 2023. He was the state's youngest and first poet laureate of color.

== Biography ==
LeFebre is a native of Denver and attended North High School. He received his B.S. in psychology from Metropolitan State University in 2004 and M.A. in arts and culture from the University of Denver.

== Career ==
Bobby LeFebre is an Emmy-nominated, SAG-Eligible writer, performer, and cultural and social worker fusing a non-traditional multi-hyphenated professional identity to imagine new realities, empower communities, advance arts and culture, and serve as an agent of provocation, transformation, equity and social change. LeFebre is the co-founder of Sacred Voices, previously known as Cafe Cultura, a nonprofit organization dedicated to supporting youth literacy through poetry.

He was a founding team member of Slam Nuba. As an actor, LeFebre is represented by Radical Artists Agency, who manage Colorado's top talent for film, commercial, voice-over, industrials, and commercial print.

LeFebre wrote the play Northside, which addresses the gentrification of Denver. The play premiered at Su Teatro Cultural & Performing Arts Center in June 2019 and sold out 30 shows, with over ten-thousand people attending. LeFebre stated "Northside" served as "an unapologetic celebration of cultural preservation and permanence and a eulogy to things lost." He called it "an urban-colloquial story of power and privilege, unflinching love, and the innate human need to belong somewhere."

He is a board member of the Clyfford Still Museum and a member of the Latino Cultural Arts Center's advisory council. He sits on the Denver Commission on Cultural Affairs and is a National Association of Latino Arts and Cultures fellow, and an Intercultural Leadership Institute fellow.

== Honors, decorations, awards and distinctions ==
He is a two-time Grand Slam Champion, a National Poetry Slam Finalist, an Individual World Poetry Slam Finalist, and a two-time TEDx speaker.

In 2015, he was named one of Colorado's Top 100 Creatives by Westword magazine.

On July 23, 2019, he was named Colorado's eighth poet laureate by Governor Jared Polis.

== See also ==
- Poet laureate
- Poetry slam
