= Entertainment Industries =

Studio album by Psy'Aviah
- Released: August 29, 2008
- Genre: Electronica, pop, Industrial, EBM
- Length: 60:00
- Label: Alfa Matrix
- Producer: Yves Schelpe, Len Lemeire

Psy'Aviah chronology
Entertainment Industries (2008)	Eclectric (2010)

Entertainment Industries is the second album by Psy'Aviah and their first release on Alfa Matrix.

The song "Moments [feat. Suzi Q. Smith]" was selected as one of the 20 best submissions in the BBC Next Big Thing 2007 contest. The videoclip for the same track got banned in 2009 by YouTube which spawned a reaction of disbelief and disapproval towards YouTube in both the press and on online communities.

== Track listing ==
1. "Entertainment Industries"
2. "Tired"
3. "Mine [Album Mix]"
4. "Voltage"
5. "Broken Child"
6. "Moments [feat. Suzi Q. Smith]"
7. "WTF"
8. "AnimalX"
9. "In The Shadows"
10. "Freedomkiller"
11. "Good vs Evil"
12. "Grace"
13. "Tired [Leæther Strip rmx]"
14. "Broken Child [IC 434 rmx]"
15. "In Silence [IMPLANT rmx]"
16. "Infected [Diffuzion rmx]"

== Personnel ==
- Yves Schelpe – keyboards, vocals, producer, programming, vocal arrangement, sound engineering, mixing
- Emélie Nicolaï – vocals, vocal arrangement, art direction, design, photography, collages
- Kristof De Clerck – guitar (tracks 4, 5, 6)
- Len Lemeire – sound engineering, mastering, mixing
