= Nellie Burget Miller =

American writer, clubwoman and lecturer

- Nellie Burget Miller (photo from Colorado Springs Pioneers Museum)
- Born: Nellie Burget; June 6, 1875; Fayette, Iowa, U.S.
- Died: June 4, 1952 (aged 76); Denver, Colorado, U.S.
- Education: Upper Iowa University
- Occupations: poet; writer; lecturer; clubwoman
- Known for: Poet Laureate of Colorado; President, Colorado State Federation of Women's Clubs
- Spouse: Lucas A. Miller
- Children: 3

Nellie Burget Miller (1875–1952) was an American writer, clubwoman, and lecturer. She served as Poet Laureate of Colorado (1923-1952) and as President of the Colorado State Federation of Women's Clubs. She published several books of poetry, the best known being The Flame of God and Earthen Bowls; The Living Drama, was an exhaustive and creditable study of the history of drama.

== Early life and education ==
Nellie Burget was born in Fayette, Iowa, June 6, 1875. Her parents were Mr. and Mrs. E. L. Burget.

She received her education at Upper Iowa University (B.S.).

In 1925, she received an honorary Master of Letters degree from the University of Colorado, and twenty years later, an honorary Doctor of Letters from Upper Iowa University.

== Career ==
The land where the good dreams grow

Miller was the author of five books and two plays, including Earthen Bowls (collected verse), The Flame of God, and The Land Where the Good Dreams Grow, a dance fantasy (juvenile play). The Living Drama (New York, Century Co., 1925) was a popular, comprehensive survey of the history of the drama from the beginnings to the present era with emphasis upon the 19th century and early 20th century. It contained a range of reading lists, questions and other guides to study, and suggestions for programs.

She contributed regularly for five years to The New Age magazine. She had a page each week in the Woman's National News and two pages each issue in the Children's Hour, (Boston). Her poems were included in Midland, Lyric West, American Poetry, Pagan, Penwoman, Suburban Life, and other magazines and newspapers.

In 1923, Miller was appointed Poet Laureate of Colorado by Governor William Ellery Sweet, a position held for life.

Miller held various local positions and was connected with civic affairs for many years. She organized the state branch of National League of American Pen Women, and became its honorary president. She served as president, Colorado State Federation of Women's Clubs; chair of Literature, General Federation of Women's Clubs, 1922-26; chair of Fine Arts, General Federation of Women's Clubs (1926-28); and served as speaker at state and national conventions. She was also a member of The Drama League, Poetry Society of Great Britain, and the P.E.O. Sisterhood. She elected to the elected to membership in the Poetry Society of America. The Poetry Fellowship of Colorado Springs was organized by Miller.

== Personal life ==
She married Dr. Lucas A. Miller. Their children were, Dorothy, Arnold, and Imogene.

She made her home in Colorado Springs, Colorado.

Nellie Burget Miller died at St. Anthony's Hospital, in Denver, Colorado, on June 4, 1952.

== Awards and honors ==
In 1922, Miller won first prize for a children's play, offered by the Pasadena Community Players. The play was published in Theater Magazine, and as a result, was put on in five different states and Cuba, in the spring of 1923.

== Selected works ==
- The Land where the Good Dreams Grow: A Dance Fantasy in Two Parts (1921)
- The Flame of God (1924)
- In Earthen Bowls (1924)
- The Living Drama: Historical Development and Modern Movements Visualized, a Drama of the Drama (1924)
- The Blue Moon (play, 1926)
- Pictures from the Plains and Other Poems, Collected Verse (1936)
- The Sun Drops Red (1947)
- In the Tents of the Shepherd Prince (1950)
