= Slam Nuba =

Performance poetry event in the United States

Slam Nuba is a performance poetry event based in Denver, Colorado, USA. It originated in 2006 as a program of the Pan African Arts Society and certified by Poetry Slam, Inc. Slam Nuba holds its poetry events at Cafe Nuba, and the major slam at The Crossroads Theater, both located in the Five Points neighborhood in Denver.

== History ==
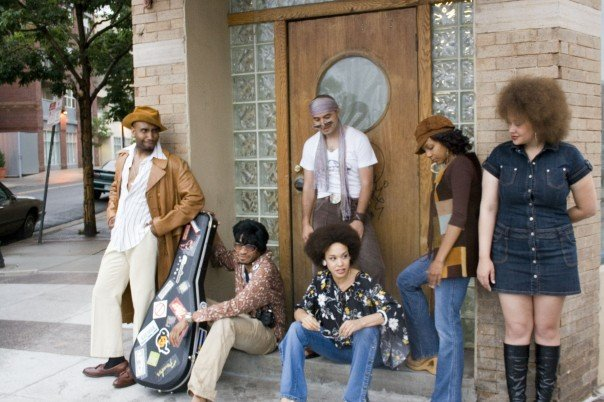
Slam Nuba 2007

Slam Nuba was conceived by Ashara Ekundayo, Ken Arkind and Panama Soweto. Café Nuba had been a registered Poetry Slam, Inc. venue for several years and had never sent a team to the National Poetry Slam. Slam Nuba is a registered program of a 501 (c)(3) non-profit organization.

In 2007, its first year of competing, Slam Nuba had four competing members, Jai Harris, Bobby LeFebre, Panama Soweto, and Lucifury (Theo Wilson). Suzi Q. Smith was the team's founder and Slam Master (organizer and manager), and Bianca Mikahn was the team's coach.

2008 saw a change for Slam Nuba. Several of the previous teams members remained but a few new ones were added to the troupe. Bobby LeFebre, Panama Soweto, Lucifury, Original Woman, and Ayinde Russell represented Slam Nuba during the 2008 slam season. Smith left as Slam Master, but Bobby LeFebre and Panama Soweto replaced her. Mikahn remained on as coach. During the 2008 season, the team performed at the wrap up party for DNC (Democratic National Convention) volunteers. The team was also featured in an article in El Semanario, Denver's weekly Latino newspaper.

In 2009, the poets representing Slam Nuba on a national level were Bobby LeFebre, Ken Arkind, Panama Soweto, The Original Woman, and Lucifury, joined by their coach, Smith. The 2010 team was coached by Lucifury and added to the team Jen Rinaldi, Jovan Mays, Megan Rickman, and Amy Everhart.

The 2011 SlamNUBA team, consisting of Theo "Lucifury" Wilson, Brando Chemtrails, Ayinde Russell, Jovan Mays Dominique Christina and Mikena Richardson, and coached by Jen Rinaldi, won the 2011 National Poetry Slam.

Also in 2011, SlamNUBA was inducted to the Denver Westword's Mastermind Class of 2011.
