= Susan Smith (disambiguation) =

Susan Smith (born 1971) is an American woman sentenced to life in prison for murdering her children.

Susan Smith may also refer to:

- Susan Smith (model) (born 1959), American model (Playboy Playmate) and actress
- Susan Arnout Smith (born 1948), American novelist, television scriptwriter, playwright and essayist
- Susan J. Smith (born 1956), British geographer and Mistress of Girton College, Cambridge
- Susan Kennedy or Susan Smith, a character in Neighbours
- Susan L. Smith, art historian
- Susan Smith, namesake of the Susan Smith Blackburn Prize for English-language women playwrights
- Sue Smith (footballer) (born 1979), English footballer
- Susan Smith (rower) (born 1965), British Olympic rower
- Susan Smith (swimmer) (born 1950), Canadian swimmer
- Sue Smith (politician) (born 1951), politician in Tasmania, Australia
- Susan Bitter Smith (born 1956), politician in Arizona, USA
- Susan Smith-Walsh (born 1971), Irish hurdler
- Susan Smith (born 1961), American woman from Kentucky who was murdered by her handler and lover, FBI agent Mark Putnam

== See also ==
- Sue Smith (disambiguation)
- Suzanne Smith (disambiguation)
