= Bianca Mikahn =

American writer

Bianca Mikahn is an American poet, spoken word artist, hip hop musician, and activist based in Denver, Colorado. Mikahn was born and raised in Westminster, and began writing poetry at a young age. She began performing slam poetry in 2006, and has coached the Slam Nuba slam poetry team. In 2016, Mikahn was named one of Westword's 100 Colorado Creatives, and one of Denver's eleven best alternative hip hop music acts. In 2019, 303 Magazine named Mikahn one of "Six Black Musicians Pushing Denver Forward."
