= Alice Polk Hill =

American poet

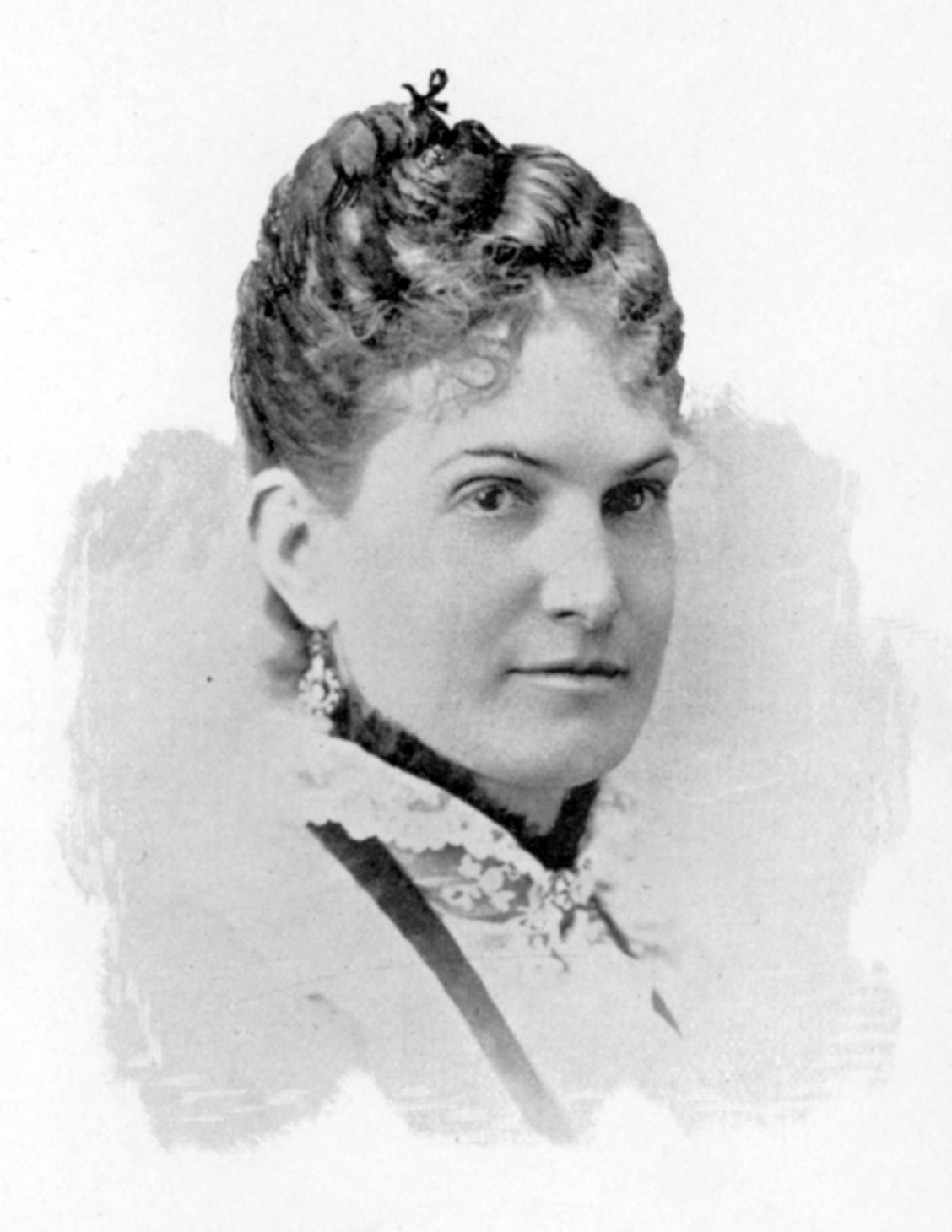
- Born: March 22, 1849; Shelbyville, Kentucky
- Died: August 31, 1921 (aged 72); Denver, Colorado
- Occupations: Poet, author, clubwoman

Alice Polk Hill (1849–1921) was Colorado's first poet laureate and an active Denver club woman.

== Career ==
Hill was actively involved in several Colorado women's clubs. She originated a Shakespeare study club, one of the first women's clubs in Denver. In 1881, she founded the "Round Table," a Chautauqua Circle which became a literary club. She served as president of the Round Table for twenty-five years. She was instrumental in founding the Denver Woman's Club and the Denver Woman's Press Club. She served as chairman of the Woman's Moffat Tunnel Commission, and was a member of the Colorado State Historical Society, Daughters of the American Revolution, Daughters of the Confederacy, League of American Pen Workers, and Poetry Society of Colorado.

Hill was the only female delegate at the Charter Convention of the City and County of Denver.

In 1884, Hill wrote Tales of the Colorado Pioneers. She later wrote Colorado Pioneers in Picture and Story in 1915.

Hill was also politically active. In 1910, she ran on the Republican ticket for the State House of Representatives.

Hill was appointed poet laureate of Colorado in 1919 by Governor Oliver Henry Shoup.

== Personal life and family ==
Hill was born in 1845 in Shelbyville, Kentucky. She attended the Science Hill Female Academy. She was married to William Crow Hill. They had one son, F. William Hill. In 1872, they moved to Denver together where he opened a dry goods store. She spent her time on fine arts, teaching music, and writing. Hill died on August 31, 1921, at 76 years old.

== Published works ==
- Tales of Colorado Pioneers (1884) Pierson & Gardner OCLC 652736
- Colorado Pioneers in Picture and Story (1915) Brock-Haffner Press OCLC 3225395

== Honors, decorations, awards and distinctions ==
- First poet laureate of Colorado
