= Sue Smith =

Sue Smith may refer to:

- Sue Smith (politician) (born 1951), member of the Tasmanian Legislative Council
- Sue Smith (footballer) (born 1979), English footballer
- Sue Smith (trainer) (born 1948), British horse trainer
- Sue Smith (writer), Australian screenwriter and playwright
- Sue Rieke Smith, American educator and politician

== See also ==
- Susan Smith (disambiguation)
- Suzanne Smith (disambiguation)
