= Psy'Aviah =

Belgian electronic rock band

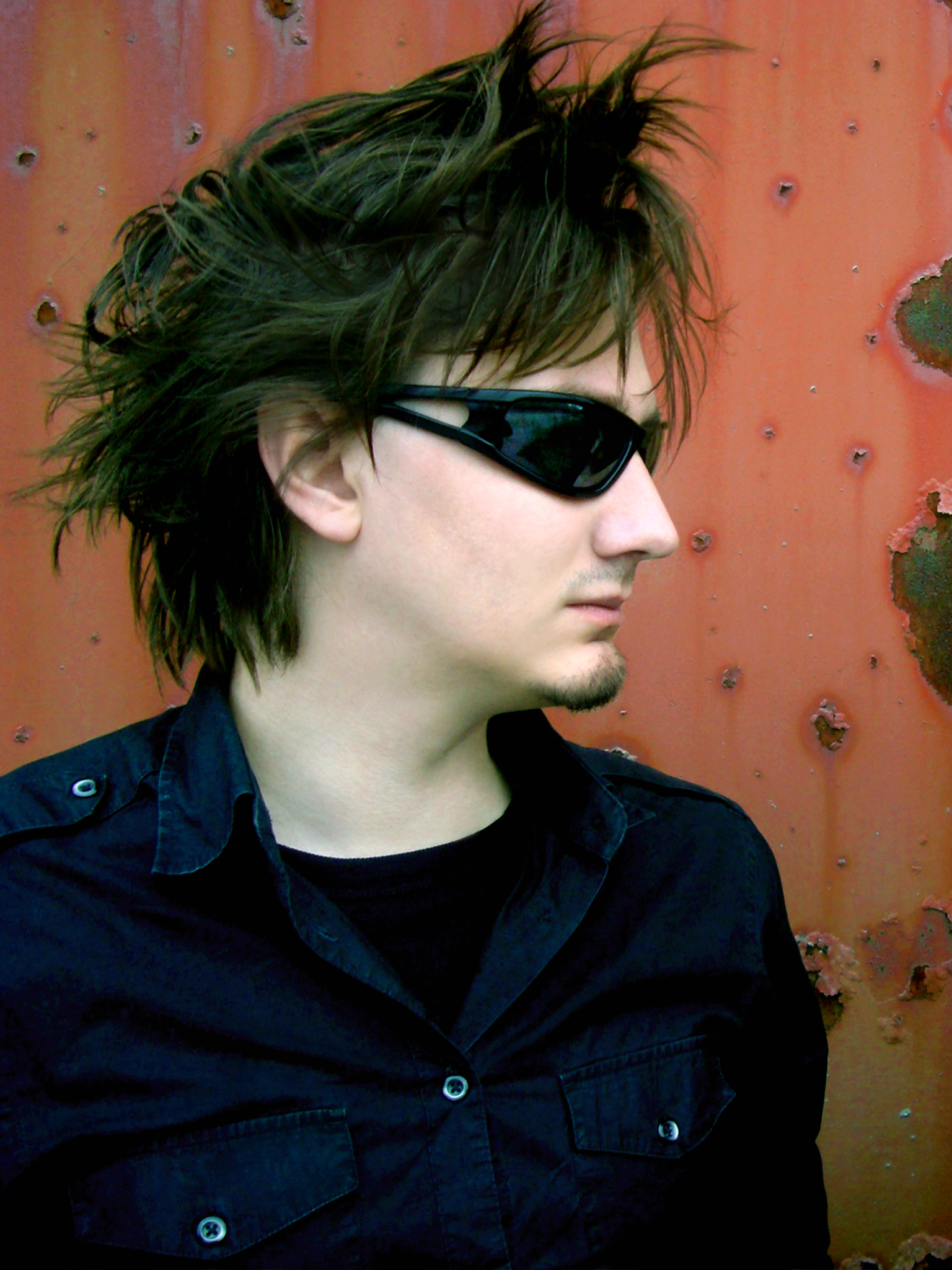

Background information
- Origin: Antwerp, Belgium
- Genres: Industrial rock, trip hop, electropop, electronic rock, electro-industrial, crossover
- Years active: 2004–present
- Labels: Alfa Matrix, Sony Soulfood Music Distribution, The Orchard
- Members: Yves Schelpe (producer/composer) (frequent recurring members: Ben Van de Cruys)
- Past members: Kristof De Clerck; Emélie Nicolaï
- Website: www.psyaviah.com

Psy'Aviah is an electronic rock band from Antwerp, Belgium.

== Career ==
The band were formed in 2004. Later that year, they won the Studio Brussel Demopoll with the song "The Future of the Sun". In 2007, they teamed up with Len Lemeire (from Implant/32Crash fame) to record their first album Creationism. 2008 saw them signing to the Alfa Matrix record label and the release of a new album, featurings and remixes.

After the release of their album Entertainment Industries in 2008 Psy'Aviah performed on festivals such as BIMFest 2008, Waregem Expo Gothic Festival 2009, VK Concerts (support Subsonica), Hof Ter Lo (support Emilie Autumn), etc..

The Psy'Aviah videoclip for their single "Moments (feat. Suzi Q. Smith)" got banned in 2009 by YouTube which spawned a reaction of disbelief and disapproval towards YouTube in both the press and in online communities.

2010 brought the third album of Psy'Aviah entitled Eclectric, produced by band member Yves Schelpe and mastered by Geert de Wilde of IC 434 in Antwerp. Their third album contained a mix of electric eclecticism, showcasing varying styles while retaining a constant hint of darkness. They invited guests such as Jean-Luc De Meyer of Front 242 fame to sing on the track Ophélie, and Jennifer Parkin of Ayria who guested on the track Into The Game.

The album Introspection / Extrospection is the band's latest and was released November 25, 2011. It again features a wild range of styles as on Eclectric, and includes a track with Swedish model and ex-Ashbury Heights singer Kari Berg, Dutch singer Lis van den Akker from Dutch act Misery as well as Belgian MC's MC Dééjoohcéé & Thomas C. Beerten. The album is their third to be released on Alfa Matrix records. The first single Ok (including the remix by M.I.K.E.) and the track SOS Overdose attracted a great deal of attention before the album was actually released.

In 2012 A follow-up to the album Introspection / Extrospection was released in the form of a DJ-EP Ok / Virtual Gods DJEP with remixes by NUDE, Jan Vervloet. The EP included a cappella versions and dub version of the songs. Before the release the Jan Vervloet remix of the track Ok leaked out and was already being played in various dj sets and podcasts, among others in the one by Johan Gielen. Concertwise the band play at venues Nijdrop for the Pluto Festival and at Ancienne Belgique as support for Praga Khan.

The year 2013 brought the band to the classic venues Nijdrop for the audio visual Pluto Festival and at Ancienne Belgique as support for Praga Khan's special 25-year anniversary concert. Meanwhile, they've also released the Future Past Mini Album / EP which featured guest vocals by Kyoko Baertsoen, the founder of act Lunascape (band) and former member of Hooverphonic. The Future Past mini album spawned two music videos for the tracks "Circles" and "Letting Go", the latter one hand-drawn, animated and directed by Emily Weeks.

2014 saw Psy'Aviah return to its core, with founder and producer Yves Schelpe writing and producing the tracks for the album The Xenogamous Endeavour. An album with guest vocals on all tracks, from the likes of Kyoko Baertsoen, Mari Kattman, Miss FD, Suzi Q. Smith, Lisa Nascimento, Lis van den Akker and more...!

Psy'Aviah continued this path in 2016 with the release of Seven Sorrows, Seven Stars. An album with guest vocalist, from the likes of Kyoko Baertsoen, Mari Kattman, Miss FD, Suzi Q. Smith, Roeland van der Velde, and more...! The album was widely received as a "5*-rated" album, and a real contender for album of the year by reviewers.

=== Live performances ===
The band has played several festivals and clubs during the years, including Nijdrop club, Trix/Hof Ter Lo, Vaartkapoen and Ancienne Belgique. They also did support for bands as Praga Khan, Subsonica, Emilie Autumn, etc..

== Discography ==
=== Albums ===
- Creationism (self-released / Digital Matrix, 2007)
- Entertainment Industries (Alfa Matrix, 2008)
- Eclectric (Alfa Matrix, 2010) / Eclectricism (Alfa Matrix, 2010)
- Introspection / Extrospection (Alfa Matrix, 2011) / Retrospection (Alfa Matrix, 2011)
- The Xenogamous Endeavour (Alfa Matrix, 2014) / The Exogamous Endeavour (Alfa Matrix, 2014)
- Seven Sorrows, Seven Stars (Alfa Matrix, 2016) / From a Different Perspective (Alfa Matrix, 2016)
- Lightflare (Alfa Matrix, 2018)
- Soul Searching (Alfa Matrix, 2019)
- Bittersweet (Alfa Matrix, 2022)

=== EPs and mini-albums ===
- Into the Game (Alfa Matrix, 2011)
- Ok / Virtual Gods DJ EP (Alfa Matrix, 2012)
- Future Past (Alfa Matrix, 2013)
- Our Common Future (Alfa Matrix, 2014)
- Never Look Back / Words (Alfa Matrix, 2015)
- Chasing the Speed of Light (Alfa Matrix, 2016)
- Looking for the Sun (Alfa Matrix, 2018)
- Dream Fever (Alfa Matrix, 2019)

=== Compilation appearances ===
- Anyone Seen My Rubber Duckie? - "The Future of the Sun" (Je M'En Fish, 2003)
- Easy Everyday - "A Red Fox" (Sint-Lukas Brussels, 2007)
- Fxxk the Mainstream Vol. 1 - "In Silence" (Alfa Matrix, 2007)
- Till Dawn Do Us Part '07 - "Infected" (Dead By Dawn, 2007)
- Endzeit Bunkertracks: Act III - "Mine" (Endzeit Mix) (Alfa Matrix, 2007)
- Cryonica Tanz v.5 - "Demons in Mind" (Cryonica, 2008)
- Re:Connected 3.0 - "Voltage" (Re:Connected Mix), video - "Moments" (feat. Suzi Q. Smith) (Alfa Matrix, 2008)

=== Remixes by Psy'Aviah ===
- Helalyn Flowers - "Voices" on A Voluntary Coincidence (Alfa Matrix, 2007)
- Diskonnekted - "When I Come to Fall" on Old School Policies (Alfa Matrix, 2008)
- Diffuzion - "No Fear" on Body Code (Alfa Matrix, 2008)
- Krystal System - "Slice" on Underground (Alfa Matrix, 2008)
- Left Spine Down - "Prozac Nation" on Smartbomb 2.3: The Underground Mixes (Synthetic Sounds, 2009)

=== Featured artists ===
- Leæther Strip on the track "The Worst In Me" from Bittersweet (Alfa Matrix, 2022)
- Mari Kattman (HELIX) on the track "Can We Make It Rhyme" from Bittersweet (Alfa Matrix, 2022)
- Madil Hardis on the track "Lost At Sea" from Bittersweet (Alfa Matrix, 2022)
- Dirk De Wachter on the track "Rainy Repertoire" from Bittersweet (Alfa Matrix, 2022)
- Kyoko Baertsoen (founder of Lunascape and ex-Hooverphonic) on the track "Our Common Future" from Future Past (Alfa Matrix, 2013)
- Kari Berg (ex-Ashbury-Heights) on the track "Deep Dark Desire" from Introspection / Extrospection (Alfa Matrix, 2011)
- Lis van den Akker of Misery on the track "Home" from Introspection / Extrospection (Alfa Matrix, 2011)
- MC Dééjoohcéé & Thomas C. Beerten on the track "Nouveau Quiche" from Introspection / Extrospection (Alfa Matrix, 2011)
- Jean-Luc De Meyer of Front 242 on the track "Ophélie" from Eclectric (Alfa Matrix, 2010)
- Jennifer Parkin of Ayria on the track "Into the Game" from Eclectric (Alfa Matrix, 2010)
- Sophie Claereboets on the track "Bad Gods Pray" from Eclectricism (Alfa Matrix, 2010)
- Leæther Strip on the track "Sweet Hard Revenge" from Endzeit Bunkertracks: Act IV (Alfa Matrix, 2009)
- Suzi Q. Smith on the track "Moments" from Entertainment Industries (Alfa Matrix, 2008)
- Nebula-H on the track "Paranoiac-Critical Method" from Nebula-H album rH (Alfa Matrix, 2008)

== Awards ==
Psy'Aviah has won Studio Brussel's demopoll in 2003. They were also nominated for BBC's The Next Big Thing in 2007 with the track "Moments" feat. Suzi Q. Smith. In 2012, they were nominated for two Hollywood Music In Media Awards: "Ok" (as pop) and "Virtual Gods" (as alternative). In 2016, they were elected as Album of the Month on Coma Music Magazine.

== Licensing for television and advertisements ==
=== TV ===
From 2014 to 2016 then the song "Our Common Future" feat. Kyoko Baertsoen was used for several episodes of TV series De Ridder starring Clara Cleymans. It was audible in episode 11 of season 2 and episodes 1, 4 and 8 of season 3 - as aired on national TV station "Eén" of VRT.

=== Commercials ===
Psy'Aviah's track "Tired" was chosen in 2007 by Microsoft to assist in the launch of Windows 7 and their focus on music. The same track was also used in the Dexia "Action Banner Concerts" (video: Banner Concert "Tired" ) campaign.

== Activism ==
=== Urban Sharing Experiment ===
In 2012 Psy'Aviah started the Urban Sharing Experiment project. By hanging and placing packages with mysterious writing and their cds inside everywhere in the city of Antwerp, Belgium in April and May 2012. By doing this, they wanted to break people's daily routine. The main philosophy behind the project is that people should be more aware of their surroundings. The band made videos on YouTube showing how they went about it, and an article on their website explaining their motivation.
