= John Bartholomew Gough =

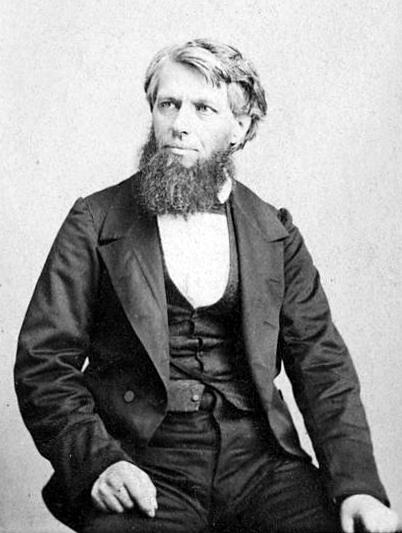
- Born: August 22, 1817
- Died: February 18, 1886 (aged 68)

John Bartholomew Gough (August 22, 1817 – February 18, 1886) was a United States temperance orator.

== Biography ==
He was born at Sandgate, Kent, England, and was educated by his mother, a schoolmistress. At the age of twelve, after his father died, he was sent to the United States to seek his fortune. He arrived in New York City in August 1829, and went to live for two years with family friends on a farm in Oneida County, New York in the western part of the state. He then entered a book-bindery in New York City to learn the trade. There in 1833 his mother and sister joined him, but after her death in 1835 he fell in with dissolute companions, and became a confirmed drunkard.

He lost his position, and for several years supported himself as a ballad singer and story-teller in the cheap theatres and concert-halls of New York and other eastern cities. He had always had a passion for the stage, and made one or two efforts to become an actor, but owing to his habits gained little favor. He married in 1839, and became a bookbinder on his own account. The effort to do his work without giving up his nightly dissipations so affected him that he was on the verge of delirium tremens. He lost his wife and child, and was reduced to the utmost misery.

Even this means of livelihood was being closed to him, when in Worcester, Massachusetts, in October 1842, a little kindness shown him by a Quaker induced him to attend a temperance meeting, and to sign a temperance pledge. After several lapses and a terrific struggle, he determined to devote his life to lecturing on behalf of temperance reform.

He set forth, carpet-bag in hand, to tramp through the New England states, glad to obtain even seventy-five cents for a temperance lecture, and soon became famous for his eloquence. An intense earnestness derived from experience, and his power of imitation and expression, enabled him to work on the sensibilities of his audiences. He was accustomed to mingle the pathetic and humorous in such a way as to attract thousands to hear him who had no purpose but to be interested and amused. In the first year of his travels, he spoke 386 times, and thenceforward for seventeen years he dealt only with temperance. During that period he addressed over 5,000 audiences.

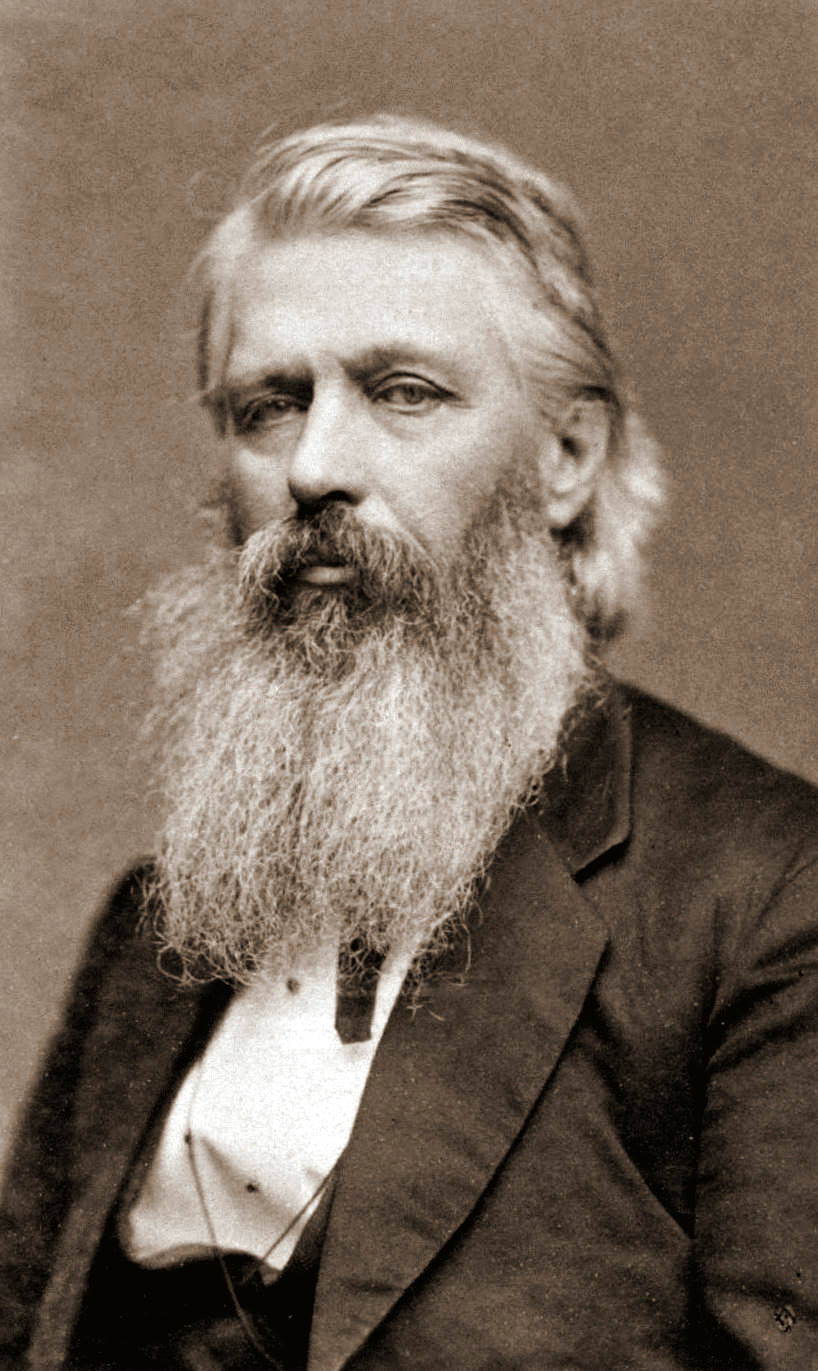

He visited England in 1853, by invitation of the London Temperance League, was entertained by George Cruikshank, the veteran artist and total abstainer, and his first address, delivered at Exeter Hall, produced a great sensation. He intended to stay but six months, but was kept busy for two years. In 1854 he had undertaken to speak at Oxford, and the students had determined to prevent him. He was greeted with hisses, cat calls, and yells. But Gough had a disciplined temper and the courage of his convictions, and an appeal to the Briton's proverbial love of fair play ended in his obtaining a hearing. On a subsequent visit, in 1878, he was received with distinguished attention by the Oxonians. He returned to the United States in 1855, and took up his old work with unabated success.

In 1857 he made another journey to England, and lectured for three years. In his temperance efforts, Gough always kept aloof from politics or any organized effort to accomplish results through legislation, relying entirely on moral influences and on the total abstinence pledge.

After confining his addresses to the subject of temperance for 17 years, he began to take up other subjects, literary and social, though from first to last his chief successes were obtained on the temperance platform. After his popularity had led him to vary his subject and to lecture before lyceums, he made a moderate fortune by his eloquence. His subjects were such as to give full scope to his powers of imitation, and to furnish opportunity to stir the feelings. "Eloquence and Orators" and "Peculiar People" were topics of this kind, in which diverting imitations played a prominent part. But he rarely failed to introduce some reference to the evils of intemperance. His oratory was not acquired, but natural. He had no elocutionary training, his reading was singularly restricted, and all his resources were from within. Yet he never failed to hold the attention of his audiences.

He continued his work until the end of his life. For several years, he made his home at Boylston, Massachusetts. He died at his work, being stricken with apoplexy on the lecture platform in the 1st Presbyterian Church of Frankford, Philadelphia, where he died two days later. He is buried at Hope Cemetery in Worcester, Massachusetts.

== Honors ==
Gough Street in San Francisco, California was named for him.

== Works ==
- Autobiography (London, 1846; 3d ed., 1853)
- Autobiography and Personal Recollections of John B. Gough (1870)
- Orations (1854)
- Temperance Addresses (New York, 1870)
- Temperance Lectures (1879)
- Sunlight and Shadow, or Gleanings from My Life Work (1880)

Some of his publications have been translated into French, Dutch, Scandinavian, and Tamil. One of his stories (The Pilot), based upon an anonymously published story The Helmsman of Lake Erie, caused Horatio Alger to write the ballad John Maynard. Gough or Alger, perhaps both, were the source for Theodor Fontane's ballad John Maynard which remains to this day popular in German speaking countries.
