= Chautauqua Circle =

African american women's scholarship and service organization in Atlanta, Georgia, USA

The Chautauqua Circle is an African American women's scholarship and service organization based in Atlanta, Georgia. Founded in 1913 by Henrietta Curtis Porter, the organization was an offshoot of the larger Chautauqua movement.

== History and Attributes ==
Organization efforts began in 1912 at the home of Mrs C C Carter on Jackson Street, Atlanta, with Mrs C H Johnson, Mrs John Bell, Mrs Walter Covington, and Henrietta Porter (Mrs J R) attending. Porter had attended three years of the Lecture Study Course at Lake Chautauqua, run by Bishop John H. Vincent, and wanted to share her passion for education. The women agreed to form a Chautauqua Study Club "with the ideals of the parent-body".

In the original constitution, membership was limited to 15 members, with replacement members admitted through membership vote. The organization had three officers, who held their positions for one year: president, secretary, and treasurer. Members who missed three meetings in a row would be dropped.

Since 1918, the "Lift Every Voice and Sing," the Black National Anthem, has been sung at every meeting.

- Official Colors: Green and White
- Motto: “Keep Moving: A Standing Pool Becomes Stagnant

== Activities ==
Today, meetings often feature well known, professional, speakers and are hosted in local venues. At its founding, members met in their homes. For meeting programs, they conducted research and wrote presentations on current events from the early 20th Century, including the Panama Canal and Mexican Revolution. The issue of woman suffrage was of lesser concern than among white women's clubs in Atlanta, with few mentions in club minutes. In 1919, a motion to support woman suffrage passed with a narrow margin after debate.

Members pursued philanthropic work, especially focused on the education of Black students. They offered summer school classes and topical lectures.

== Members ==
Between 1913 and 1941, the Chautauqua Circle had included 35 individual members; by 1964 42 members. Though all identified themselves as housewives, half of the women were employed. All of the employed women had worked in education as teachers or principals. As indicative of their social and financial status, none of the women were domestic workers. Many of the members were resident's of Atlanta Old Fourth Ward.

Charter members of the Chautauqua Circle were Mrs. Samuel Archer, Mrs. Joseph Bibb, Mrs. Matthew Bullock, Mrs. Antoine Graves, Mrs. John Greenwood, Mrs. Ella Landrum, Miss Bessie Landrum, Mrs. John Ross, Mrs. Thomas Slater, Mrs. John Brown Watson, and recognized founder, Henrietta Curtis Porter. Porter, was born in Marion, Alabama, to formerly enslaved parents. Her father, Alexander H. Curtis, served in the Alabama state legislature, representing Perry County. Henrietta Curtis married Dr. James Porter.

Through the 1940s, average membership time was nine to fifteen years. Preference for new members was given to the married daughters of current or former members, and then to local women, or women who had lived in the area the longest.

Notable members include:

- Shirley Franklin - Former Mayor of Atlanta
- Julia Bond - Librarian at [Clark] Atlanta University and mother of Julian Bond
- Alice Holmes Washington - Librarian; member Atlanta Fulton County Library Board; helped establishment of the Auburn Avenue Research Library on African American Culture and History
- Isabel Gates Webster - Atlanta Court Judge
- J Veronica Biggins - C&S Bank executive
- Mae Maxwell Yates - Director of the Carrie Steele-Pitts Home for children
- Clara Yates Hayley - Coordinator of the Atlanta Public School's Center for Reading Services
