= Josiah Holbrook =

American educator

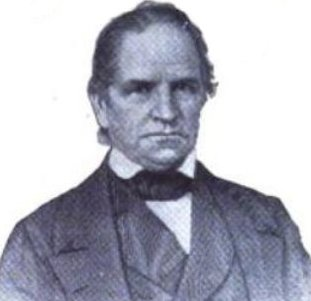
- 1826 portrait
- Born: June 17, 1788; Derby, Connecticut
- Died: June 20, 1854 (aged 66); Lynchburg, Virginia
- Occupation: Educator

Josiah Holbrook (June 17, 1788 – June 20, 1854) was the initiator and organizer of the lyceum movement in the United States. He formed the first industrial school in the country in 1819, organized the first lyceum school in the country in 1826 and inspired the foundation of the American Lyceum Association, the first national education association. He founded the Holbrook School Apparatus Manufacturing Company and made a variety of teacher aid items for common schools and scientific training aids for teachers to use in lyceums. He also wrote and traveled extensively to promote the lyceum concept. His method combined teaching in academic subjects like Greek, history and mathematics with practical farming skills and crafts. In the beginning, his system flourished in the New England states, later branching out into the Midwestern states, and eventually going nationwide to 3,000 towns and cities. He was also an advocate of professional teacher training and broadening female education.

== Early life and education ==
Josiah Holbrook was born on the family farm in Derby, Connecticut, on June 17, 1788. His father, Josiah, had been a colonel in the American Revolutionary War and was descended from Englishman John Holbrook, who emigrated from Derby and settled at Oyster Bay, Long Island in 1652, and whose descendants founded the Connecticut town. Josiah was privately educated under pastor Amasa Porter of Derby, England, and entered Yale College in 1806 at the age of eighteen. There scientist Benjamin Silliman interested him in chemistry and mineralogy. He graduated from Yale in 1810 when twenty years old and became an itinerant teacher, teaching farm technology and lecturing on geology in the northeastern states.

In 1813, he married Lucy Swift, a daughter of Rev. Zephania Swift. They had two sons, Alfred and Dwight. His wife died in 1819. Josiah's parents died about the same time and he inherited the family farm. He decided to learn animal husbandry to add to his knowledge of scientific farming techniques that he was already practiced in. About this time, he also started to develop his ideas on educational reform.

In 1819, Holbrook organized the first industrial school in the United States on his family's farm. Modeled after the agronomy ideas of Philipp Emanuel von Fellenberg of Switzerland, it combined academic study with teaching practical skills and crafts. The students worked on the farm for a part of their tuition. In 1824 Holbrook introduced the study of languages besides English, like Latin, Greek, and French. Students studied more advanced mathematics, including algebra, geometry, and trigonometry, as well as geography and history. The school also had courses in various branches of astronomy, botany, chemistry, mineralogy, and zoology.

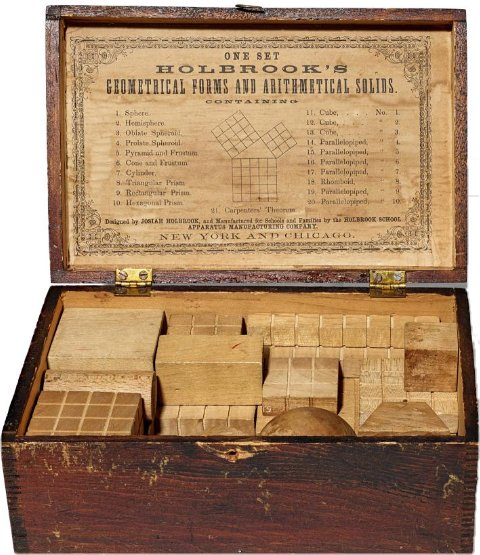
Geometrical form blocks made by Holbrook Apparatus Manufacturing Company, circa 1858

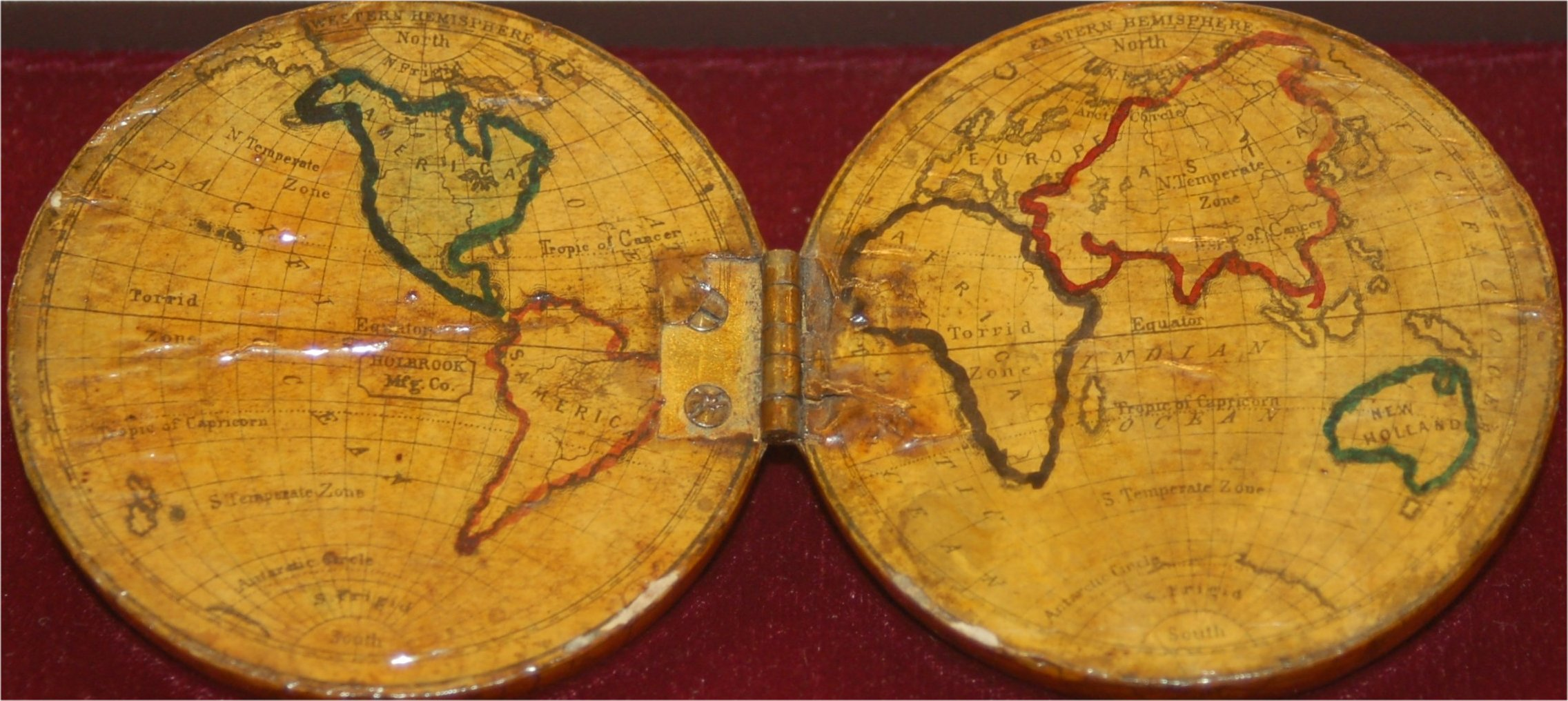
Holbrook hinged pocket globe with hinge

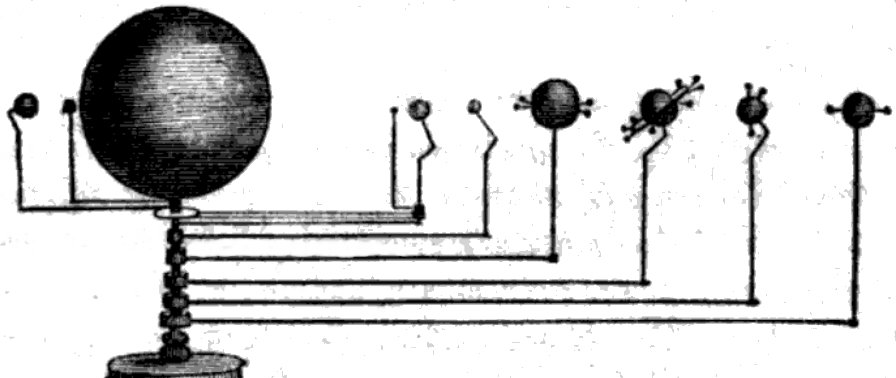
Holbrook school Planetarium Orrery apparatus

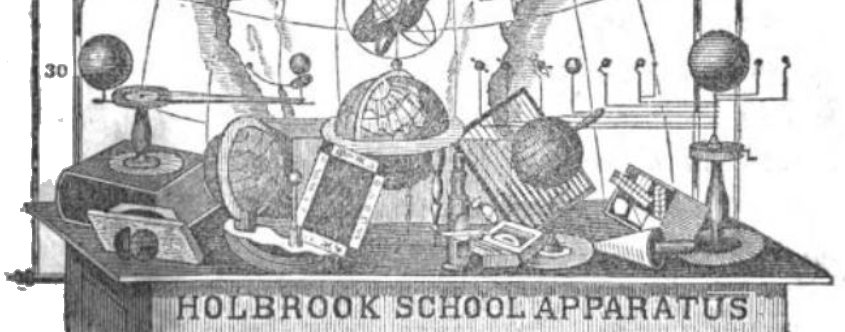
School desk filled with teacher apparatus made by Holbrook's company

== Educational theory and lyceums ==
In early 1826, Holbrook published an article in Henry Barnard's Journal of Education on his plan of Association of Adults for the purpose of Mutual Education, proposing the creation of a lyceum school. For him, a defining characteristic of a lyceum was as an organization of people interested in acquiring self knowledge and a wider understanding of culture, dedicated to the advancement of education through “the general diffusion of knowledge” and the "raising the moral and intellectual taste" of the population. He wanted a broad social structure that would provide a common education for young adults from a variety of backgrounds to help in their future careers. He described a lyceum as an organization of people interested in acquiring knowledge through their own efforts and thinking. As well as scientific techniques, scholarly endeavors, religion, and politics, he saw education as teaching crafts, the mechanics of agricultural methods, geological surveys and a range of other practical subjects.

In 1826, Holbrook founded the first formal lyceum school in the United States. It was formed in Millbury, Massachusetts and called the Milbury Lyceum No 1 branch of the American Lyceum. The school followed the example of the farm, combining teaching of practical and theoretical skills. Towns in other part of New England and the Midwestern United States followed his example, creating town, county and state lyceums. The Worcester County Lyceum was founded in 1827; the Boston Mechanics Lyceum followed in 1830 and the Massachusetts State Lyceum in 1831. In that year, the various lyceums met together for the first time in New York City and created a National Lyceum. Holbrook's lyceum system concept spread further and reached the mid-Atlantic States and parts of the Western and Southern states. Many of these schools worked together, forming the first nationwide organization of lyceum schools. This became the American Lyceum Association, the first national education association.

Holbrook was successful in his Boston business and used his profits for producing equipment to use in educational establishments. In 1825 Holbrook began to make cheap apparatus for illustrating geography, geometry, and natural philosophy. He founded The Holbrook School Apparatus Manufacturing Company at West Boylston, Massachusetts, in 1828 and built a factory to manufacture the apparatus, and the following year expanded production in Boston with another educator; it became known throughout the United States. Between 1829 and 1844 he set up additional factories to make his school teaching aids in Baltimore, Philadelphia, and New York City. In addition to writing slates and magnets, products included wooden geometric solids, like the cube root block, a multi-piece sectional block for illustrating the mathematical cube root, and instruments such as orreries and tellurions.

Holbrook traveled throughout the New England states promoting the lyceum school idea with instruction pamphlets he wrote and lectures he did using these teaching aids. Holbrook's lyceum system concept was published in the First Quarterly Report of the Universal Lyceum in 1837 and in The Self Instructor and Journal of the Universal Lyceum in 1842.

== Later life and legacy ==
Holbrook moved to Washington, D.C., in the late 1840s and there wrote articles advocating the notion of the lyceum. He also helped develop the lyceum town of Berea, Ohio. In later life, he went on geological expeditions and on one such trip at Lynchburg, Virginia, in 1854, he had an accident and drowned at Blackwater Creek on June 20.

Holbrook left a large legacy. His theories were a significant motivator and inspiration behind the growth of industrial training in the United States for young adult men. He also considered the role of women, advocating that vocational training should not be restricted by gender, and that women were more than simply "one man's wife and the mother of his children". Similarly, he held that race was not a barrier to learning, arguing for "the complete manhood of the negro". He believed in the need for a uniform educational system in the United States and was an advocate of professional teacher training. He attracted notable speakers to the lyceum schools included Louis Agassiz, Daniel Webster, Oliver Wendell Holmes Sr., Nathaniel Hawthorne and Susan B. Anthony, as well as occasional talks by William Lloyd Garrison, Wendell Phillips and Frederick Douglass. He was considered 50 years ahead of his time in teaching, since he was amongst the first to recognize the importance of physical and mental training together. In 1835, it was estimated that there were approximately 3,000 cities and towns which operated a school under his approach. However, eventually other formal teaching methods took the place of his lyceum schools and by 1880 the vast majority had closed.

== Works ==
Amongst his writing, Holbrook wrote the following:

- American lyceum of science and the arts, composed of associations for mutual instruction and designers (1827)
- American Lyceum, or, Society for the Improvement of Schools and Diffusion of Useful Knowledge (1829)
- Scientific Tracts (1830–1832)
- The Family Lyceum (1832–1833)
- Geometrical diagrams: Family lyceum extra.(1832–1833)
- Easy lessons in geometry, intended for infant and primary schools: but useful in academies, lyceums and families (1842)
- The child's first drawing book; and object teaching primer for home and school (1846)
- Child's first book: drawing series (1854–1859)

== Sources ==
- Barnard, Henry (1860). Memoir of Josiah Holbrook. Hartford, Conn: F.B. Perkins. OCLC 40152534.
- Dewey, Melvil (1901). Library Journal. Chicago, Illinois: University of Illinois. OCLC 224515880.
- Holbrook, Alfred (1885). Happy Life of a Teacher. Elm Street Printing Company. "This was the first manual labor school that I have any knowledge of."
- Johnson, Thomas H. (1966). The Oxford Companion to American History. New York, New York: Oxford University Press.
- Monroe, Paul (1911). A Cyclopedia of Education. Gale Research Company. p. 111. "Holbrook, as early as 1819, organized the first industrial school in the United States after the pattern of Fellenberg's institution at Hofwyl."
- Oliver, John William (2003). Cradles of Conscience. Kent State University Press. ISBN 9780873387637.
- Parlette, Ralph Albert (1919). "Josiah Holbrook 1788 - 1854". The Lyceum Magazine. Standard Chautauqua System.
- Proceedings (1907). American Lyceum Association.
- Ray, Angela G. (2005). The Lyceum and Public Culture in 19th-century United States. Michigan State University Press. ISBN 978-0-87013-745-7.
- Van Doren, Charles Lincoln (1974). Webster's American Biographies. G. & C. Merriam Company. ISBN 9780877790532.
- Whitman, Alden (1985). American Reformers. H.W. Wilson Company. ISBN 082420705X.
