= American Quartette =

The American Quartette was a mixed vocal quartet of the chatauqua circuit in the 1920s, consisting of coloratura soprano Helen Bickerton, contralto Esther Muenstermann, lyric tenor B. Fred Wise, and baritone Raymund Koch under the direction of Edwin Stanley Seder.

Muenstermann had previously performed with the Redpath Grand Opera Company, singing the role of Donna Angelica in their 1913 production of Parelli's A Lovers' Quarrel.

Koch went on to a solo career, including an appearance at the Ann Arbor, Michigan May Festival in 1928.

Bickerton and Koch toured together, each recording for the Majestic Records label in February 1930.

Seder had been assistant professor of piano and theory of music, and the director of the College of Fine Arts at the University of New Mexico in Albuquerque from 1914. He was a member of Phi Kappa Phi, Sigma Chi and a Fellow of the American Guild of Organists. In later years he was professor of organ at Northwestern University, the organist and choir director at People’s Church in Chicago, and the organist of the Chicago Sunday Evening Club, which met in Orchestra Hall.
