= Suzanne Weaver Smith =

American mechanical and aerospace engineer

Suzanne Weaver Smith is an American mechanical and aerospace engineer whose research involves the structural analysis of large flexible truss structures, damage detection in intelligent structures, and the use of drones to direct emergency responses. She is a professor of mechanical engineering, the former Donald and Gertrude Lester Professor in Mechanical Engineering and director of the Unmanned Systems Consortium at the University of Kentucky.

== Education and career ==
After majoring in mechanical engineering at Clemson University, and earning a bachelor's degree in 1978 and master's degree in engineering mechanics there in 1980, Smith worked from 1980 to 1980 in the Government Aerospace Systems Division of Harris Corporation, on modeling the effects of launch vibration on the control systems of the Hubble Space Telescope. Returning to graduate study in engineering mechanics, she completed a Ph.D. at Virginia Tech in 1988, with a dissertation involving damage detection in the structure of the International Space Station.

After two more years of postdoctoral research at Virginia Tech, she became an assistant professor of engineering mechanics at the University of Kentucky in 1990. She was Donald and Gertrude Lester Professor in Mechanical Engineering from 2004 to 2019, and became director of the Unmanned Systems Consortium in 2013.

== Recognition ==
Smith was inducted into the Kentucky Aviation Hall of Fame in 2019. She was named as a Fellow of the American Institute of Aeronautics and Astronautics in 2020.
