= Lyceum movement =

Mid-1800s American adult education movement

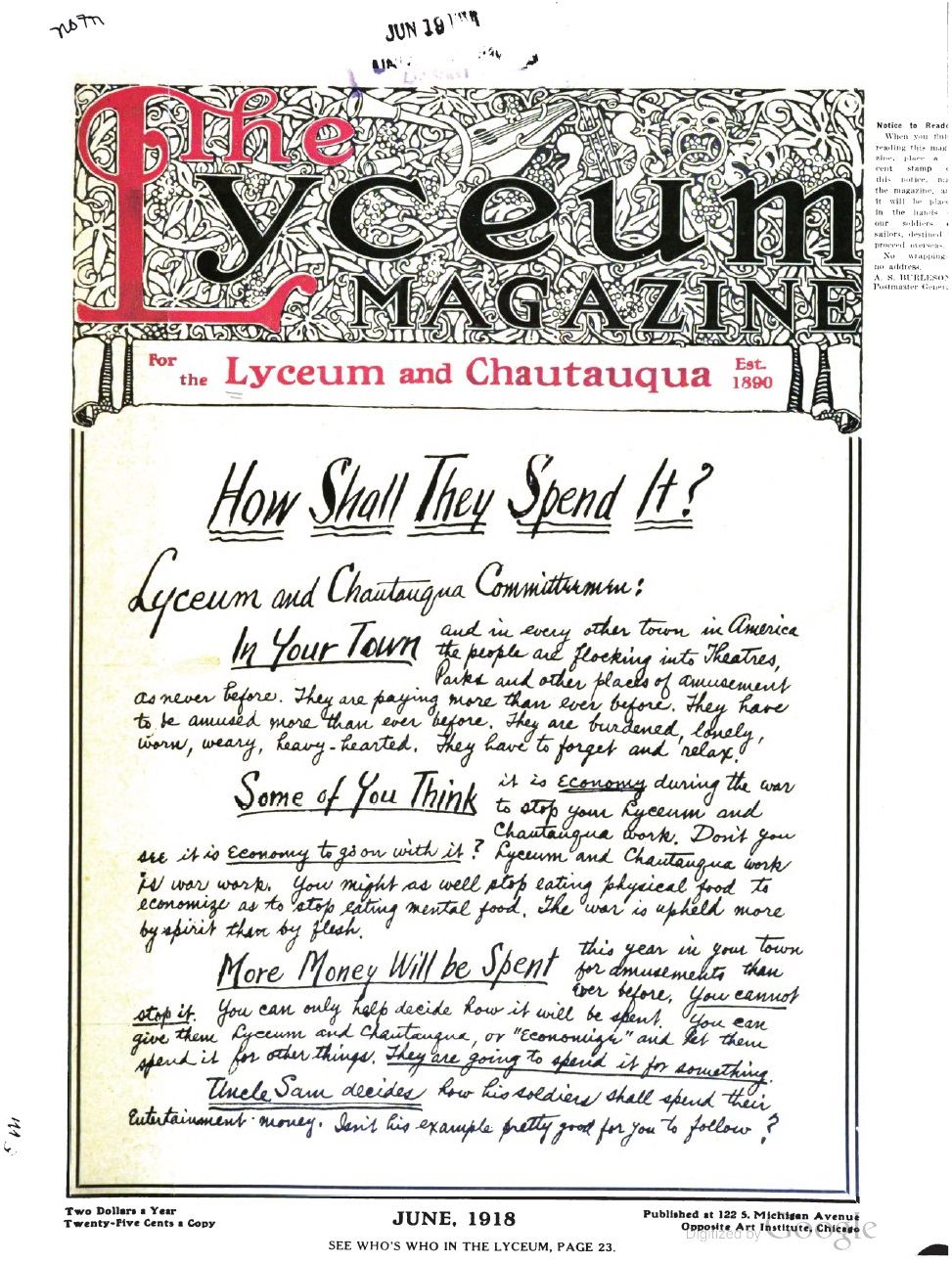
The Lyceum Magazine, Chicago. The magazine worked toward the movement's goals of improving society by its advertisements of event choices for members to sponsor for their communities.

The American Lyceum Movement was a loose collection of adult education programs that flourished in the mid-19th century in the United States, particularly in the Northeast and Midwest, that were inspired by the classical Lyceum. Some of these organizations lasted until the early 20th century.

== Purpose ==
The lyceums, mechanics’ institutes, and agriculture organizations like The Grange flourished in the U.S. before and after the Civil War. They were important in the development of education in America. During this period hundreds of informal associations were established for the purpose of improving the social, intellectual, and moral fabric of society. The lyceum movement featured lectures, dramatic performances, class instructions, and debates, by noted lecturers, entertainers and readers. They would travel the "lyceum circuit," going from town to town or state to state to entertain, speak, or debate in a variety of locations, never staying in one place for too long. Their appearances were open to the public, which caused them to contribute significantly to the education of the adult American in the 19th century.

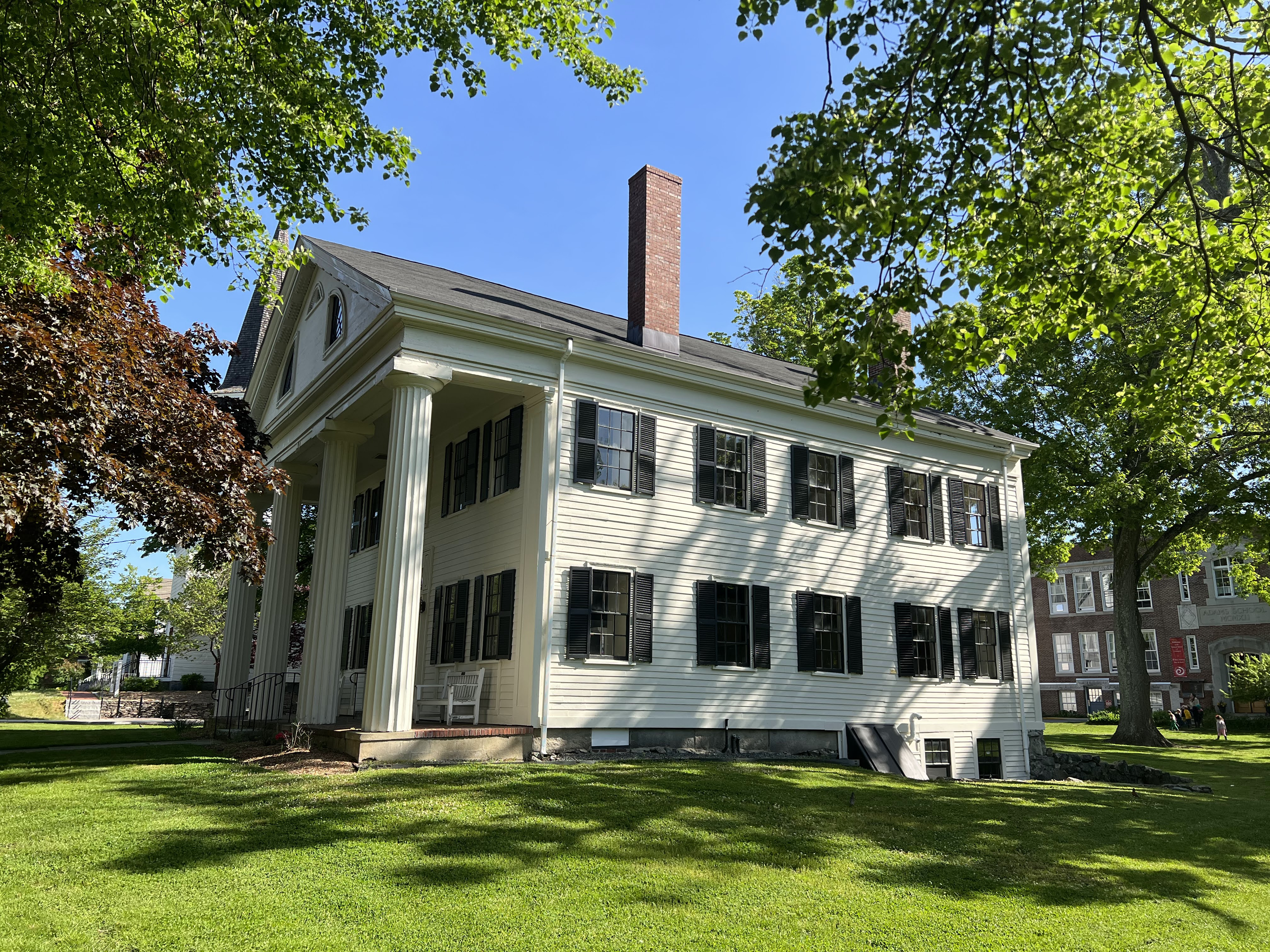
The Ellen Stone Building in Lexington, MA was built as a Lyceum Hall in 1833.

== Origins ==
The first American lyceum, "Millbury Branch Number 1 of the American Lyceum," was founded by Josiah Holbrook in 1826. Holbrook was a traveling lecturer and teacher who believed that education was a lifelong experience, and intended to create a National American Lyceum organization that would oversee this method of teaching. Other educators adopted the lyceum format but were not interested in organizing, so this idea was ultimately dropped.

== Peak of the movement ==
The Lyceum Movement reached the peak of its popularity in the antebellum era. Public Lyceums were set up around the country, as far south as Florida and west as Detroit, Michigan. Transcendentalists such as Ralph Waldo Emerson and Henry David Thoreau endorsed the movement and gave speeches at many local lyceums. As a young man, Abraham Lincoln gave a speech to a Lyceum in Springfield, Illinois.

== Lyceum as entertainment ==
After the American Civil War, lyceums were increasingly used as a venue for travelling entertainers, such as vaudeville and minstrel shows. They were also still used for public speeches and lectures. Notable public figures such as Ralph Waldo Emerson,Susan B. Anthony, Elizabeth Cady Stanton, Lucy Stone, Victoria Woodhull, Anna Dickinson, Josiah Gilbert Holland, Mark Twain, and William Lloyd Garrison, all spoke at lyceums in the late 19th century.

== See also ==
- Lyceum
- Lyceum (Alexandria, Virginia)
- The Lyceum (Mississippi)
- Oregon Lyceum
- Chautauqua
- Lecture circuit
- Nipo T. Strongheart
