= Suzi Smith (volleyball) =

Canadian volleyball player (born 1962)

Personal information
- Born: 27 November 1962 (age 63) Balcarres, Saskatchewan, Canada

Sport
- Sport: Volleyball

Suzi Smith (born 27 November 1962) is a Canadian volleyball player. She competed in the women's tournament at the 1984 Summer Olympics.
