= Suzi Q. Smith =

American poet

Suzi Q. Smith is an American award-winning artist, activist, and educator who lives in Denver, Colorado.

== Poetry ==
She began writing poetry in her elementary years and by high school was participating in poetry readings and poetry slams. She began her career as an activist working with civil rights organizations, and continued working as a community organizer and artist performing throughout the United States. She has shared stages with Nikki Giovanni, the late Gil Scott Heron, and many more. Her poems have appeared in Union Station Magazine, Suspect Press, La Palabra, Muzzle Magazine, Malpais Review, The Pedestal, The Los Angeles Journal, Denver Syntax, Word is Bond, The Peralta Press, Yellow Chair Review, and in the anthologies The Mutiny Info Reader, Diverse-City, His Rib: Anthology of Women, and In Our Own Words. Her chapbook collection of poems, Thirteen Descansos, was published by Penmanship Books, and a full-length collection, A Gospel of Bones, will be available from Alternating Current Press in spring 2020.

== Poetry Slam ==
In 2006, she worked with community activist Ashara Ekundayo and poets Ken Arkind and Panama Soweto to launch Slam Nuba, which quickly became one of the nation's most highly ranked poetry slams.

She became the founding Slammaster of Slam Nuba, and spent 12 years in the poetry slam arena as a competing poet, coach, organizer, board member, eventually serving as the Executive Director of Poetry Slam, Inc. from 2014-2018. She placed as a finalist multiple times in the Women of the World Poetry Slam, the Individual World Poetry Slam, and she has earned the champion title at Southwest Shootout and the Taos Poetry Festival several times. In addition, she has worked extensively with youth, serving as a Partner Artist with Youth On Record, and as co-coach of Denver Minor Disturbance Youth Poetry Slam, resulting in two international championships.

== Hip hop, spoken word and other music ==
In 2007, she collaborated with Belgian group Psy'Aviah on their single 'Moments', which was a finalist in the BBC's 'Next Big Thing' Contest and was later released on their [Alfa Matrix] debut, 'Entertainment Industries'. The video was released and received 3 million views in 3 months, and was subsequently banned from youtube.com due to their claim that the content was 'explicit'. The video's ban received attention in the national press in Belgium, including Het Laatste Nieuws, De Morgen, and Gazet Van Antwerpen.

In 2008, she released a spoken word album entitled Picks, Pistols, and Prayers, featuring the title track dedicated to Huey P. Newton. In 2011, she released her second spoken word album entitled "Re-Mixed", a collaborative music project featuring the work of several producers from around the world. Her third spoken word album, "Black Hole Mouth" was released in January 2013.

Smith was also a founding member of one of Denver's most popular musical acts, the Lady Wu Tang Clan, from its launch in January 2011 until May 2013, performing as Method Man alongside her fellow Lady Wu Tang members to sold-out audiences around the region, and sharing stages with Raekwon and Ghostface Killah of the Wu-Tang Clan.

== Theater ==
Smith is also a writer and performer in How I Got Over: Journeys in Verse, an experimental play written in verse. Produced by Off-Center Theatre Company at the Denver Center for Performing Arts, the show premiered to a sold-out audience in March 2016 and continued to sell out every show during its run.

“Suzi Q. Smith has spent much of her life giving voice to suppressed and oppressed girls and young women. How I Got Over: Journeys in Verse features Smith and four young warrior poets offering fresh and largely unheard perspectives.”

== Publications ==
=== Poetry collection ===
- A Gospel of Bones. Alternating Current Press. Spring 2020.

=== Poetry chapbook collection ===
- Thirteen Descansos. Penmanship Publishing. January 2015.

=== Journals ===
- “We Pay Cash for Houses” Suspect Press. Winter 2018.
- “Bones”. Suspect Press. September 2016.
- “Until the End of Time”. Yellow Chair Review. May 2016.
- “Sweetback”. No Dear Magazine. February 2016.
- “Game”. Union Station Magazine. March 2014.
- “Wet”. Suspect Press. January 2014.
- “Twelve” and “Thirteen”. La Palabra. January 2014.
- “My Father’s Hands” Muzzle Magazine. November 2013.
- “I Do Not Know How to Love You in English” Malpais Review . June 2012.
- “Tattoo” and “Lazarus” The Pedestal Magazine. January 2010.
- “Ripe” The Los Angeles Journal . April 2006.
- “Emancipation” Word is Bond . April 2005.
- “Forge” The Peralta Press. Spring ed. 2002.

=== Anthologies ===
- “Bones” and “Mustangs”. Mutiny Info Reader. November 2016.
- “My Stepfather is Not the Kind of Man Who Weeps” *Diverse-City Anthology. April 2013.
- “Blue” World of Women Poetry Anthology. March 2008.
- “Infidelity” His Rib: Anthology of Women. July 2007.
- “Jalat Khan” In Our Own Words Anthology. March 2003.

== Productions ==
- Where We Are From: Freedom is a Constant Struggle. Co-Writer. December 2018. Produced by 5280 Co-Op at Aurora Cultural Arts District.
- How I Got Over. Co-Writer & Performer'. March 2017. Produced by Off-Center Theatre Company at the Denver Center for Performing Arts.

== Awards, honors, titles ==
- Swanee Hunt Individual Leadership Award, 2018
- Champion, Individual Competition, Southwest Shootout 2016
- 100 Colorado Creatives, Westword 2015
- Finalist, Women of the World Poetry Slam 2011, 2013
- Champion, Team Competition, Southwest Shootout 2012
- Finalist, Individual Competition, Southwest Shootout 2011
- Semi–Finalist, National Poetry Slam 2011 and 2012
- Champion, Silver Tongue Champion, Verse/Converse Festival 2011, 2012, 2013
- Finalist, Individual World Poetry Slam 2011
- Finalist, Pablo Neruda Poetry Festival Barrio Slam, 2009, 2011, 2013

== Sources ==
- https://www.broadwayworld.com/denver/article/Denver-Arts-Venues-And-SCFD-Co-Host-Event-On-Implementing-Equity-In-The-Workplace-20190912
- https://theknow.denverpost.com/2019/08/27/empathy-museum-denver/221808/
- Whipple, Kelsey. "Slam poet Suzi Q. Smith brought a national championship to Denver" Westword, February 2012. *http://www.westword.com/2012-02-16/news/suzi-q-smith-denvers-slam-poet/
- https://www.denverpost.com/news/ci_21805919/student-creativity-finds-new-forms-during-national-day
- http://www.rockymountainnews.com/drmn/local/article/0,1299,DRMN_15_5703541,00.html
- http://www.poetryslam.com/
- https://www.austinchronicle.com/gyrobase/Issue/story?oid=oid:510956
- http://www.westword.com/2012-02-16/news/suzi-q-smith-denvers-slam-poet/
- http://www.boulderweekly.com/article-6391-wu-tang-style.html
- http://www.bbcwordservice.com/thenextbigthing
- http://www.regenmag.com/Interviews-263-PsyAviah.html
