= The Joy Thieves =

- Origin: Chicago, Illinois, US
- Genre: post-industrial
- Years active: 2017–present
- Label: Armalyte Industries
- Website: Official Website

The Joy Thieves is a musical supergroup, consisting of current, former, and touring members of bands such as Ministry, Stabbing Westward, The Rollins Band, Killing Joke, Pigface, Revolting Cocks, <PIG>, David Bowie, Machines of Loving Grace, Marilyn Manson, Depeche Mode, Nine Inch Nails, KMFDM, Naked Raygun, Foetus, My Life with the Thrill Kill Kult, Blue October, Pegboy, Nitzer Ebb, White Zombie, and many more. The band incorporates elements of industrial, industrial rock, hard rock, alternative, and punk into their music. Along with their original releases, The Joy Thieves have also done official remixes for many other artists, including Chris Connelly, <PIG>, Consolidated, Drownd, I Ya Toyah, Blue Eyed Christ, Machines With Human Skin, DogTablet, A Covenant of Thorns, Death Pop Radio, Sapphira Vee, Stoneburner, and more.

"Joy Thieves Productions” refers to the audio production team of Dan Milligan and James Scott.

== History ==
=== Formation and This Will Kill That (2017–2019) ===
The Joy Thieves began in December 2017, when Chicago drummer/musician Dan Milligan began assembling a group of musicians to contribute to a new industrial rock recording project. Word of the new “supergroup” began spreading over the course of the next year, as notable musicians Chris Connelly, David Suycott, Howie Beno, Matt Noveskey, Andy Gerold, and Louis Svitek became involved, and there were over 30 contributors before the band had released any music. In early 2019, The Joy Thieves signed a record deal with London's Armalyte Industries.

On May 31, 2019, the band released a music video for the title track of their debut EP, This Will Kill That. Sung by Chris Connelly, he described the song as “a direct reference to Victor Hugo’s prophecy that the printed word would make the church obsolete.” It was also written in response to a series of nightmares that Dan Milligan was having as he was writing music for the EP. This Will Kill That was officially released on June 28, 2019, and it featured appearances by guitarist Andy Gerold, and drummer David Suycott.

=== Cities In Dust EP (2019) ===
On October 4, 2019, The Joy Thieves released their second EP, Cities In Dust, as a free download-only EP on Armalyte Industries. In addition to their remake of the Siouxsie and the Banshees’ song, Cities In Dust, the 6-song EP included remixes of songs from This Will Kill That, with contributions from John Fryer, Howie Beno & Brandt Gassman, and Armalyte Industries label-mates, i! On October 14, 2019, they released the music video for Cities In Dust.

=== A Blue Girl EP (2020) ===
On March 6, 2020, the band released a video for the title track for their third EP release, A Blue Girl, and the EP was released by Armalyte Industries on March 13, 2020. Created by a much larger cast of musicians than their previous two releases, A Blue Girl features appearances by Chris Connelly, Howie Beno, Marcus Eliopulos, Andy Gerold, Matt Noveskey, Julian Beeston, Louis Svitek, and more. The band also released a lyric video for The Badlander (feat. Chris Connelly) on March 27, 2020.

=== Genocide Love Song single (2020) ===
On May 15, 2020, The Joy Thieves released an unannounced single titled Genocide Love Song, as well as an accompanying video for the title song. The single, the video, and the remix were conceived, recorded, mixed, mastered, and released during a single week of the lockdown during the COVID-19 quarantine. The song was written by Dan Milligan and Chris Connelly as a scathing indictment of the government; specifically how their handling of the COVID-19 situation was leading to unnecessary deaths, including the death of Milligan's uncle.)

=== American Parasite (2021) ===
On July 23, 2021, the band released their first full-length album, American Parasite, on Armalyte Industries. Stylistically different from their previous releases, American Parasite finds the band embracing a punk rock sound much more than their previous releases. And instead of having a different vocalist on each track, like their previous releases, all of the lead vocals on American Parasite were done by Chris Connelly. Several new members were inducted into the group during the making of the album, including drummer Paul Ferguson (Killing Joke, Murder Inc, Warrior Soul, The Orb), drummer Joe Haggerty (The Effigies, Pegboy), guitarist John Haggerty (Naked Raygun, Pegboy), guitarist Chris Haskett (The Rollins Band, David Bowie, Foetus), and songwriter Scott-David Allen (A Covenant of Thorns, The Burying Kind).

=== Disaster Film: The Joy Thieves Live at Populist Studio (2021) ===
After several years of existing as only a recording entity, The Joy Thieves created a live version of the band in June 2021 that consisted of Dan Milligan, James Scott, Marcus Eliopulos, Jeff Harris, Matt Clark, Chris Connelly, and Ania Tarnowska. After one rehearsal, the band brought in a video crew and recorded audio and video of five Joy Thieves songs: American Parasite, Drown By Invitation, A Blue Girl, Cities In Dust and Wonder War. The result is Disaster Film: The Joy Thieves Live at Populist Studio; an addendum to American Parasite that was given away free to anyone who purchased American Parasite from the Armalyte Industries' Bandcamp page.

=== Nemesis single (2021) ===
On September 17, 2021, Armalyte Industries released another unannounced single by The Joy Thieves; a free, digital-only cover of the song Nemesis by the band Shriekback. The release included three remixes of the single: Nemesis (Blue Eyed Christ Remix) by John D. Norten, Nemesis (Dark Waters Mix) by Wandering Stars, and Nemesis (Blacklight Mix featuring Carl Marsh) by Sapphira Vee.

=== 6 To 3 EP (2022) ===
On November 25, 2022, The Joy Thieves commemorated The International Day for the Elimination of Violence against Women by releasing 6 To 3. The EP was written and recorded as a direct response to the US Supreme Court’s decision to overturn Roe v. Wade in 2022, with the band donating all profits from the album to the National Network of Abortion Funds.. The release featured three new original songs, and remixes by Walter Flakus (Stabbing Westward), Jim Marcus (GoFight / Die Warzau), Steven Archer (Stoneburner / Ego Likeness), and Eva X.

=== Dissent-ertainment: 6 To 3 Remixed (2023) ===
On June 24, 2023 The Joy Thieves and Armalyte Industries released Dissent-ertainment: 6 To 3 Remixed to commemorate the one year anniversary of the U.S. Supreme Court’s overturning of Roe v. Wade. In 2022, the band had released 6 To 3, and made remix stems of two songs available to any artist who wanted to remix a song, and donate their profits to the National Network of Abortion Funds; Dissent-ertainment: 6 To 3 Remixed was a collection of eleven of those remixes.

=== The Heart of the Worm EP (2024) ===
The Joy Thieves released The Heart of the Worm EP on Armalyte Industries on March 22, 2024. This release featured the song Spilt Milk, which was the first single from their upcoming album of the same name. It also included the song Relentless, which featured vocalist Mike Reidy (W.O.R.M: The World Organization of the Righteous Movement, Pigface), and Louis Svitek (Ministry, Pigface, Mindfunk, Zoetrope, Project .44).

=== Return To Needle Park EP (2024) ===
May 3, 2024 saw the release of Return To Needle Park on Armalyte Industries. It featured Digging Deeper, which was the second single from the upcoming Spilt Milk album, a cover of the Killing Joke classic Loose Cannon, and two Steven OLaf remixes of the first single, Spilt Milk.

=== Spilt Milk/You Cannot Steal What’s Already Gone (2024) ===
The Joy Thieves released their second full-length album, Spilt Milk, on June 28, 2024; the 5-year anniversary of the release of their first EP, This Will Kill That. The album contained seven songs, and three remixes; two done by Joy Thieves Productions, and one by Walter Flakus (Stabbing Westward).

Armalyte Industries released physical copies of the album, that included a limited edition poster, and a bonus CD of remixes of songs from the band’s history, titled You Cannot Steal What’s Already Gone. Remixers included Howie Beno (Ministry, Black Asteroid, Silver Relics, Depeche Mode, Red Hot Chili Peppers, Mary’s Window, Sheep On Drugs, Skrew, 13MG, Blondie) and Brandt Gassman, Mark Pistel (Consolidated, Meat Beat Manifesto), Charlie Bowes (Seething Akira), and Martin King (Test Dept, Pigface, Dogtablet).

== Members ==
The Joy Thieves are an ever-growing, ever-changing collective of musicians. The following is a partial list of members, along with a list of some of the other musical projects in which they have been involved.

- Amy Abramite (Mary’s Window)
- Scott-David Allen (A Covenant of Thorns, The Burying Kind)
- Steven Archer (Ego Likeness, Stoneburner)
- Tessa Asyd (Designer Violence)
- Dave Bachta (Lovelies Bleeding)
- Julian Beeston (Nitzer Ebb, Cubanate, Bob Marley, Billy Idol, William Orbit, Gravity Kills, BT, Flood)
- Howie Beno (Ministry, Black Asteroid, Silver Relics, Depeche Mode, Red Hot Chili Peppers, Sheep On Drugs, Skrew, 13MG, Blondie)
- Laura Bienz (Lorelei Dreaming)
- Bradley Bills (CHANT)
- Taylor Busby (Purple)
- Derek Christopher (Wandering Stars)
- Matthew Clark (Mary's Window)
- Chris Connelly (solo artist CC, Finitribe, Revolting Cocks, Ministry, Pigface, Murder, Inc., The Damage Manual, Acid Horse, Cocksure, Bells Into Machines, Everyoned)
- Ed Cripps (Batavia)
- Terri Cripps (Batavia)
- Mike Czarnik (Mary's Window)
- Roger Ebner (Pigface, BILE, DogTablet, Darling Kandie, WORM, TR8, Machines With Human Skin, Sapphira Vee, Modiviccan.)
- Marcus Eliopulos (Stabbing Westward)
- Eva X
- Walter Flakus (Stabbing Westward, The Dreaming)
- Paul Ferguson (Killing Joke, Warrior Soul, Murder, Inc., The Orb)
- Ed Finkler (Dead Agent, Cult of Jester)
- Mia FluxXx (FLUXXX, Featured, Gritty In Pink)
- John Fryer (Black Needle Noise, Nine Inch Nails, Depeche Mode, This Mortal Coil, White Zombie, Stabbing Westward, Gravity Kills, Jesus Jones, Silver Ghost Shimmer, Yaz, Peter Murphy)
- Brandt Gassman (hypefactor)
- Andy Gerold (Marilyn Manson, Ashes Divide, 16Volt, There Is No Us)
- Laura Glyda (solo artist)
- Michael Allen Gould (Spyderbone)
- Lana Guerra (artist, fashion designer, and performer)
- Joe Haggerty (The Effigies, Pegboy)
- John Haggerty (Naked Raygun, Pegboy)
- Cat Hall (Dissonance)
- Adrian Halo (Machines With Human Skin)
- Jeff Harris (Mary's Window, Traveling Sky, Release)
- Chris Haskett (The Rollins Band, David Bowie, Foetus)
- DJ Darryl Hell (Abstinence, Furnace Records)
- Ryan Henderson (Kady Rain, Cara Van Thorn, Emily Wolfe)
- Katzen Hobbes (The Human Marvels, 999 Eyes Freakshow)
- Brad Huston (Cyanotic, Grainshifter, D-VOID)
- i! (i!)
- Jane Jensen (solo artist, Oxygiene 23, Martin Bisi, The Dolls)
- Mari Kattman (solo artist, Helix)
- Martin King (Dogtablet, Pigface, Test Dept.)
- Jason Kottwitz (The Dead Boys)
- Eric Liljehorn: (Death Pop Radio, In Europe Without a Jacket)
- Ken Magerman (Amaranth)
- Groovie Mann (My Life With the Thrill Kill Kult, Trash Deity)
- Jim Marcus (GoFight, Die Warzau)
- Geoff Matson (solo artist)
- Dave McAnally (Derision Cult, SYS Machine)
- Jaysun McBain (Murmuur, Traveling Sky, Release)
- Lee Meadows (Codename:Lola, The Glass House Museum, DJ Batboy Slim, co-founder of World Goth Day)
- Melodywhore (Dissonance, Collapse of Dawn, Corpsegrindr, Venus McVee and Notorious Erich von P)
- Matt Mercado (Mindbomb, Daisy Chain, Supermercado, Pivot Man. Owner of Sonic Palace Recording Studio, Chicago)
- Dan Milligan (Drownbeat, The Burying Kind, Mary's Window, Sword Tongue)
- John Mooney (Johnathan|Christian)
- Dee J Nelson (Death Pop Radio)
- John D. Norten (Blue Eyed Christ, Trash Deity, Lady Gaga, Prince, Snoop Dogg, Dr. Dre)
- Matt Noveskey (Blue October)
- Steven OLaf
- Nina Ophelia (Designer Violence)
- Phil Owen (Skatenigs)
- Sean Payne (Glitch Mode Recordings, Cyanotic, CONFORMCO)
- Mark Pistel (Consolidated, Meat Beat Manifesto
- Josh Pyle (Aphorism)
- Mike Reidy (W.O.R.M: The World Organization of the Righteous Movement)
- Greg Rolfes (eleven12 Design)
- Sapphira Vee (Collapse of Dawn, Venus McVee & Notorious Erich Von P, Blindcopy, Dogtablet)
- Coral Scere (SCERE)
- Collin Schipper (Amaranth)
- Foxy Scott
- Destiny Justic Scott (Destiny Scott Design)
- James Scott (She Rides Tigers, Matthew. Owner and head engineer at Populist Recording Studio)
- Gregory Stokes (Wandering Stars)
- Grant Sutton (Jumpsuit, The Party Downers, Monster Trux)
- David Suycott (Stabbing Westward, Machines of Loving Grace, Spies Who Surf, Razorhouse, Verbow)
- Louis Svitek (Ministry, Pigface, Mindfunk, Zoetrope, Project .44)
- Ania Tarnowska (I Ya Toyah)
- Veronica Tam
- Mimi Wallman (ONO, Ampyre, Host Body)
- Worth Steeling (forging sound with fire)
- Raymond Watts (<PIG>, KMFDM)
- Gordon Young (Children On Stun, Dream Disciples, Gary Numan)

== Joy Thieves Productions ==
In addition to all of the releases for the band, Joy Thieves Productions has done recording, mixing, audio production, remixing and mastering projects with recording artists such as:

- Chris Connelly (solo artist, Finitribe, Revolting Cocks, Ministry, Pigface, Murder, Inc., The Damage Manual, Acid Horse, Cocksure, Bells Into Machines, Everyoned)
- Raymond Watts (<PIG>, KMFDM)
- Groovie Mann (My Life with the Thrill Kill Kult)
- Louis Svitek (Ministry, Pigface, Mindfunk, Zoetrope, Project .44)
- Julian Beeston (Nitzer Ebb, Cubanate, Bob Marley, Billy Idol, William Orbit, Gravity Kills, BT, Flood)
- Mark Pistel (Consolidated, Meat Beat Manifesto, The Disposable Heroes of Hiphoprisy, MC 900 Foot Jesus, Machines of Loving Grace, Grace Jones)
- Carl Marsh (Shriekback)
- Phil Owen (Skatenigs)
- Ania Tarnowska (I Ya Toyah)
- Martin King (Test Dept., DogTablet, Pigface)
- Jared Louche (Chemlab, DogTablet)
- En Esch (KMFDM, Pigface, PIG, Slick Idiot)
- Mea Fisher (Lords of Acid)
- Howie Beno (Ministry, Black Asteroid, Silver Relics, Depeche Mode, Red Hot Chili Peppers, Mary's Window, Sheep On Drugs, Skrew, 13MG, Blondie)
- Gordon Young (Children On Stun, Dream Disciples, Gary Numan)
- David Suycott (Stabbing Westward, Machines of Loving Grace, Spies Who Surf, Razorhouse, Verbow)

== Discography ==
=== Studio recordings ===
- 2019: This Will Kill That (Armalyte Industries)
- 2019: Cities In Dust (Armalyte Industries)
- 2020: A Blue Girl (Armalyte Industries)
- 2020: Genocide Love Song (Armalyte Industries)
- 2021: American Parasite (Armalyte Industries)
- 2021: Nemesis (Armalyte Industries)
- 2022: 6 To 3 (Armalyte Industries)
- 2023: 6 To 3 Remixed (Armalyte Industries)
- 2024: The Heart of the Worm (Armalyte Industries)
- 2024: Return To Needle Park (Armalyte Industries)
- 2024: Spilt Milk/You Cannot Steal What's Already Gone (Armalyte Industries)
- 2026: The Wrong End of Your Rifle (Armalyte Industries)

=== Video releases ===
- 2021 Disaster Film: The Joy Thieves Live at Populist Studio (Armalyte Industries)

=== Official Remixes ===
- A Covenant of Thorns: Dahlia (Phosphene Dreams Mix)
- Amulet: Out of Control (Nothing Left to Say Remix)
- Amulet: When Winter Comes (Swaggrotech Remix)
- Blindcopy: Blacklight (3:13AM Mix)
- Blue Eyed Christ feat. En Esch and Mea Fisher: World On Fire (The Joy Thieves Remix)
- Chris Connelly: Picassa (Fantoma Tranquille Remix)
- Chris Connelly: The Sun Is a Maze (M-Descent Remix)
- Concrete Hyena: Hi, I'm Radio Mike (The Joy Thieves Remix)
- Consolidated: Capitalism (The Joy Thieves Remix)
- Dance Loud: Hollow (Dan Milligan Remix)
- Darling Kandie: Fashion Bi Evol (Killiope Inside of Me Mix)
- Dead Agent: Faulted (BIG TALK Mix)
- Death Pop Radio: Like a Bomb (Joy Thieves rEmiX)
- Der Prosector: Car Bomb (Hellburner Mix)
- Derision Cult feat. Chris Connelly and Reeves Gabrels: Deaf Blood (Exploit the Moment Mix)
- Designer Violence: Be There (Joy Thieves Remix)
- Dogtablet feat. Jared Louche: Tail Lights Fading (Tributary Mix)
- Dogtablet feat. Groovie Mann: 5 Broken Straws (LA Remix)
- Dogtablet: You & Me (The Burying Kind Dream Mix)
- Dogtablet: Ladrones de Alegria Mix)
- DROWND: Sick Like You (Smoulder Mix)
- Funeral March of the Marionettes: It All Falls Apart (The Joy Thieves Mix)
- Garek: Ledge (The Rock Remix)
- I Ya Toyah: Glass Eyes (The Joy Thieves Remix)
- I Ya Toyah: Vast Spaces (The Joy Thieves Remix)
- La Muerte feat. Richard 23 & Patrick Codenys (Front 242): Headhunter (Lock the Tarrrrrrget Mix)
- Machines With Human Souls: Awake (Joy Thieves Remix)
- Machines With Human Souls: The Imposter (Joy Thieves Remix)
- Manticore Kiss: Aboulia (Joy Thieves Remix)
- MOIII: Needles on the Tundra (The Joy Thieves Remix feat. Chris Connelly)
- Mokosh: Spavaj (Dan Milligan Remix)
- Newphasemusic: Starter (The Joy Thieves Remix)
- <PIG>: Confession (Feeding the Beast Mix)
- <PIG> X The Joy Thieves: Badland(er) (Blowtorch Blues Remix)
- Sapphira Vee feat. Jim Semonik: The Heart Wants (Joy Thieves Remix)
- Sapphira Vee: Greed (Grab 'EM by the…Mix) (The Joy Thieves Remix)
- Sapphira Vee: Who (Will I Be) Today (The Joy Thieves Remix)
- Skatenigs: Honor Among Thieves (Remix of Chemical Imbalance)
- Skatenigs: Hell And Back (Ten Feet Tall Remix)
- Stoneburner: Beauty Is Terror (F7 Joy Thieves Remix)
- Sword Tongue: Into the Sun (Coronal Loops Mix)
- .SYS Machine: Drowning In the Past (The Joy Thieves Mix)
- The Blue Hour feat. Mark Gemini Thwaite: What I Say (MaGenTa Mix)
- The Burying Kind: Coming Through (It Don’t Mean a Thing Remix)'
- The Joy Thieves: Tempting the Flames (Smoulder Mix)
- The Joy Thieves: Honeycomb and Silk (Hallowed Be Thy Brain Mix)
- The Joy Thieves: This Will Kill That (Life In Greyscale Mix)
- The Joy Thieves: Genocide Love Song (An Inconvenient Mix)
- The Joy Thieves: 6 To 3 (Pickacide Remix)
- The Joy Thieves: Spilt Milk (Neuroplastic Remix)
- The Joy Thieves: Digging Deeper (I Out Remix)
- The Joy Thieves: Chemical Dreams (Vertical Mix)
- The Veldt: Check Out Your Mind (The Joy Thieves RMX)
- Unhappily Ever Now: Unhappily Ever Now (The Joy Thieves Remix)
- Unhappily Ever Now: Whispering Wandering Struggling (The Joy Thieves Remix)
- Wandering Stars: The Way It Goes (Axcs Of Basxs Mix)

=== Compilations ===
- Tiny Gods Who Walk Beside Us
- Tear Down The Walls: A Riveting Tribute To Pink Floyd's The Wall (Riveting Music)
- The Unquiet Grave 2020 (Cleopatra Records)
- Mind over Metal - Volume 2 (Cave Dweller Music)
- Black is the New Black: The Power & Privilege Industrial Culture Compilation (Furnace Records)
- Broken Hearts & Robot Parts, Volume II (COP International)
- Armalyte XX (Armalyte Industries)
- Follow the Leaders: A Killing Joke Tribute (Coitus Interruptus Productions)
- Regulate This: A Riveting Tribute to Girl Power (Riveting Music)

== See also ==
- post-industrial
