= Loved by Thousands, Hated by Millions =

Compilation album by M.O.D.
- Released: November 1995
- Recorded: Pyramid Sound, Ithaca, New York; Trax East Studios, South River, New Jersey, United States
- Genre: Crossover thrash
- Length: 59:59
- Label: Megaforce Records
- Producer: Steve Evetts; Rob Hunter; Scott Ian; Billy Milano; Alex Perialas; Ernie Schaeffer

M.O.D. chronology
Devolution (1994)	Loved by Thousands, Hated by Millions (1995)	Dictated Aggression (1996)

Professional ratings
Review scores
Source	Rating
Allmusic	3/5 stars

Loved by Thousands, Hated by Millions is a compilation album of songs from American crossover thrash band, M.O.D. It was released in 1995 on Megaforce Records and contains material from the band's first three albums – U.S.A. for M.O.D., Gross Misconduct, and Rhythm of Fear – and the EP, Surfin' M.O.D.. It also contains a number of new songs which were previously not on any other album.

Songs from the band's previous album, 1994's Devolution, were not included on this compilation because it was their first for another label. All albums up until then had been on Megaforce Records. Dictated Aggression, their subsequent album, was on Music For Nations.

== Track listing ==
No.	Title	Length
1.	"Noize"	0:13
2.	"Aren't You Hungry?"	3:26
3.	"Spandex Enormity"	5:27
4.	"A.I.D.S."	2:00
5.	"Hate Tank"	2:13
6.	"Goldfish"	1:01
7.	"Surfin' U.S.A."	2:32
8.	"Surf's Up"	2:03
9.	"Mr. Oofus"	3:37
10.	"No Glove, No Love"	2:51
11.	"True Colors"	3:49
12.	"Livin' in the City"	1:58
13.	"Get Up and Dance"	2:59
14.	"Rhymestein"	2:36
15.	"Irresponsible"	2:26
16.	"Rally (N.Y.C.)"	1:40
17.	"The Ballad of Dio"	0:11
18.	"Bubble Butt"	0:44
19.	"Short but Sweet"	0:07
20.	"Ode to Harry"	1:30
21.	"Vents"	0:09
22.	"Theme Song"	2:10
23.	"Bonanza"	2:44
24.	"Buckshot Blues"	0:11
25.	"Clubbin' Seals"	1:55
26.	"U.S. Dreams"	2:28
27.	"He's Dead Jim"	1:50
28.	"Get the Boot"	3:12
29.	"Color My World"	1:57

== Credits ==
- Billy Milano – vocals, bass
- Tim McMurtrie – guitar
- John Pereksta – guitar
- Louis Svitek – guitar
- Joe Young – guitar
- Scott Ian – acoustic guitar
- Ken Balone – bass
- John Monte – bass
- Rob Moschetti – bass
- John Pereksta – bass
- Dave Chavarri – drums
- Keith Davis – drums
- Tim Mallare – drums
- Darren Verpeut – drums
- Recorded at Pyramid Sound, Ithaca, New York, and Trax East Studios, South River, New Jersey, USA
- Produced by Steve Evetts, Rob Hunter, Scott Ian, Billy Milano, Alex Perialas, and Ernie Schaeffer
- Edited by Rob Hunter at Pyramid Sound
- Cover art by Anthony Ferrara

== Miscellanea ==
The quote "Loved by Thousands, Hated by Millions" first appears in the 1975 Paul Bartel's movie Death Race 2000 when a television reporter introduces Machine Gun Joe Viterbo. Machine Gun Joe Viterbo was played by Sylvester Stallone.
