= Mind Funk =

American rock band

- L-R: Pat Dubar, Shawn Johnson, Jason Everman, Spike Xavier, Louis Svitek (1993)

Background information
- Genres: Alternative metal, funk metal, grunge, stoner rock
- Labels: Megaforce, Epic, Music For Nations

Mind Funk (spelled Mindfunk on later releases) was an American rock band, containing members of Chemical Waste and several other bands. The band was originally known as "Mind Fuck" but were forced by Epic Records to change their name. They signed to the Sony/Epic record label and released their self-titled debut album in 1991. Guitarist Jason Everman, known for stints on guitar and bass with Nirvana and Soundgarden, joined and later left in September 1994 to join the US Army 2nd Ranger Battalion and the Special Forces. Louis Svitek went on to later perform with Ministry and has since opened his new recording studio and label, Wu-Li Records. John Monte also later performed with Ministry.

== Members ==
=== Final lineup ===
- Pat Dubar - vocals (formerly of Uniform Choice)
- Louis Svitek - guitar (formerly of M.O.D., Ministry)
- Frank Ciampi - bass
- Shawn Johnson - drums

=== Past ===
- Jason Coppola - guitar (formerly of Chemical Waste)
- John Monte - bass (formerly of M.O.D., Chemical Waste, Human Waste Project, Evil Mothers, Dragpipe)
- Reed St. Mark - drums (formerly of Celtic Frost)
- Jason Everman - guitar (formerly of Nirvana, Soundgarden, OLD)
- Spike Xavier - bass (formerly of Mind Over Four)

== Discography ==
Albums

- Mind Funk (1991) (Epic)
- Dropped (1993) (Megaforce Records)
- People Who Fell from the Sky (1995) (Music For Nations)

Singles and EPs

- Touch You (EP, 1991) (Epic)
- "Big House Burning" (single, 1991) (Epic)
