= Dropped (Mind Funk album) =

Studio album by Mind Funk
- Released: 1993
- Recorded: Bad Animals Studios, Seattle, Washington
- Genre: Stoner metal; grunge
- Length: 64:10
- Label: Megaforce
- Producer: Terry Date

Mind Funk chronology
Mind Funk (1991)	Dropped (1993)	People Who Fell from the Sky (1995)

Professional ratings
Review scores
Source	Rating
AllMusic	3/5 stars
The Encyclopedia of Popular Music	3/5 stars

Dropped is the second studio album by American rock band Mind Funk. The title is a reference to the loss of their recording contract with Epic Records prior to recording the album.

== Production ==
The band was about to start recording sessions for the album when they were informed that Epic Records had dropped them. Producer Terry Date encouraged the band to stay together, record the album in Seattle, and use a cheaper and more live recording style.

== Critical reception ==
Trouser Press called the album "competent and tasteful but undistinguished", writing that "[guitarists] Everman and Svitek whip up smartly modulated guitar noise bolstered by a strong, slightly stiff rhythm section and functional tunes." The Washington Post wrote: "Boasting an effectively off-kilter weave of standard-issue grunge and unexpected psychedelic flourishes, Dropped is equal parts trippy impressionism ('11 Ton Butterfly') and brooding introspection ('Drowning')." The Tampa Bay Times wrote that the band "musters enough intensity to overcome its shortcomings in the originality department."

== Track listing ==
1. "Goddess"– 5:17
2. "Closer"– 5:31
3. "Drowning"– 6:32
4. "In the Way Eye"– 5:40
5. "Zootiehead"– 4:14
6. "Wisteria"– 7:01
7. "Mama, Moses and Me"– 4:31
8. "11 Ton Butterfly"– 6:30
9. "Hogwallow"– 4:58
10. "Billygoat"– 5:16
11. "Hollow" 8:36

== Personnel ==
- Patrick Dubar – lead vocals
- Louis Svitek – lead guitar, backing vocals
- Jason Everman – lead guitar, backing vocals
- John Monte – bass, backing vocals
- Shawn Johnson – drums
- Terry Date – producer
