= Mind Over Four =

American metal band

- Origin: Orange County, California, U.S.
- Genres: Alternative metal, progressive metal
- Years active: 1983–1995
- Members: Spike Xavier; Mike Jensen; Mark Fullerton; Rich Castillo
- Past members: Jeff Koegel; Dave Hamilton "Dan"; Steve Crow; Lou Gaez; Dan Colburn

Mind Over Four (occasionally written as Mind Over 4) was an American heavy metal group based out of Orange County, California.

== History ==
Mind Over Four started as a sort of psychedelic punk band, but eventually began creating their own unique brand of prog/metal. In interviews, they often referred to their music as "experimetal". BNR Metal Pages describes them as "occupy[ing] that gray area between metal and uncommercial hard rock, but with a quirkiness in the songwriting that makes them difficult to describe or categorize". During the course of the band, they recorded six albums and brought their electrifying live show to 14 countries and many national US tours.

In 1993, singer Spike Xavier was invited to audition as the lead singer of Anthrax after they fired Joey Belladonna; however, Anthrax ultimately hired John Bush.

Mind Over Four dissolved shortly after the release of their 1995 album, Empty Hands. Xavier went on to play bass in his brother's band Humble Gods. He also played bass for the funk/metal band Mindfunk, and eventually founded Corporate Avenger with Mindfunk vocalist Pat Dubar. Mike Jensen toured with KMFDM as guitar player and later joined the short-lived band Overbreaker. Jensen released solo material under the name of Michael Fordays. Rich Castillo released a mix of solo material ranging from Frank Zappa-influenced comedy to jazz instrumentals. Mark Fullerton worked on the production side of the film industry in Los Angeles for 15 years before moving to Utah. He now plays drums in a classic rock cover band called Mesozoic.

In the August 21, 1993 issue of Kerrang! magazine, a review of Mind Over Four's The Goddess album read: "At their best, they're untouchable, unbelievable, perhaps the metal discovery of the '90s...utter perfection".

On the back cover photo of the Pantera album Vulgar Display of Power, Phil Anselmo can be seen wearing one of the band's T-shirts.

== Members ==
- Spike Xavier – vocals
- Mike Jensen – guitars
- Mark Fullerton – drums
- Rich Castillo – bass

=== Previous members ===
- Jeff Koegel – bass
- Dave Hamilton – bass
- Dean R – drums
- "Dan" – drums
- Steve Crow – guitar (Desperate Expression – self-released '83)
- Lou Gaez – drums (Desperate Expression – self-released '83)
- Dan Colburn – bass
- Sean Elliott – bass

== Discography ==
- Desperate Expression (1983) (self-released)
- Out Here (1987) (Triple X Records)
- Mind Over Four (1989) (Destiny Records)
- The Goddess (1990) (Caroline)
- Half Way Down (1993) (Restless)
- Empty Hands (1995) (Fierce)
