= Surfin' M.O.D. =

EP by M.O.D.
- Released: June 1988
- Recorded: Pyramid Sound, Ithaca, New York, USA
- Genre: Crossover thrash
- Length: 19:48; 21:40 (with bonus)
- Label: Megaforce Records
- Producer: Alex Perialas

M.O.D. chronology
U.S.A. for M.O.D. (1987)	Surfin' M.O.D. (1988)	Gross Misconduct (1989)

Professional ratings
Review scores
Source	Rating
Allmusic	2.5/5 stars

Surfin' M.O.D. is an EP from American crossover thrash band, M.O.D. It was released in 1988 on Megaforce Records and follows 1987's debut album, U.S.A. for M.O.D. In 1989, the band subsequently released Gross Misconduct, their second full length-studio album.

Apart from Billy Milano, it featured a completely different line-up compared to the first album released a little more than a year previous – it included among others, Tim Mallare on drums, who later went on to play with the thrash metal band Overkill.

This release has two parts:

-"The Movie" (track 1) which is a spoken word story featuring actual songs in between the dialogue for a fake movie.

-"The Sound Track Without The Movie" (tracks 2–8). It is the actual music from the movie separated into tracks and without all the dialogue.

== Incorrect Track listing ==
The CD lists the following erroneous track list on the cover:

No.	Title	Length
1.	"Surfin' U.S.A."
2.	"Surf's Up"
3.	"Sargent Drexell Theme"
4.	"Mr. Oofus"
5.	"Party Animal"
6.	"Color My World"
7.	"Shout"

- This track list is in fact incorrect, as "The Movie" is track one, "Sargent Drexell Theme" is only included as part of track one, and there is an unlisted CD-bonus track ("New Song") as track eight.

== Actual Track listing ==
All songs written by M.O.D., unless stated otherwise

No.	Title	Length
1.	"The Movie: Goldfish from Hell; Totally Narley Talking by Katrina & Bill; Surfin' U.S.A.; More Narley Talking by Katrina & Bill; Surf's Up; Sargent Drexell Theme; Billy, Katrina & Alex Spot Oofus; Mr. Oofus; Still More Narley Talk & The Party Crash Scene; Party Animal; Bill's Big Love Scene; Color My World; Bill & Katrina split Up & The Big Party Scene; Shout; The Big Finale"	23:32
2.	"Surfin' U.S.A." (The Beach Boys cover)	2:34
3.	"Surf's Up"	2:03
4.	"Mr. Oofus"	3:36
5.	"Party Animal"	3:20
6.	"Color My World" (Chicago cover)	1:57
7.	"Shout" (The Isley Brothers cover)	4:26
8.	"New Song" (Scream cover)	1:52

- Track 8 is a CD bonus track.
- The album includes several uncredited samples from the 1987 film "Back to the Beach", starring Frankie Avalon, Annette Funicello, Lori Loughlin and Connie Stevens.

== Credits ==
- Billy Milano – vocals
- Louis Svitek – guitar
- John Monte – bass
- Tim Mallare – drums
- Recorded at Pyramid Sound, Ithaca, New York, USA
- Produced, engineered, and mixed by Alex Perialas
- Assistant engineered by Rob Hunter
- Cover art by Craig Hamilton
