= Gross Misconduct =

Studio album by M.O.D.
- Released: 1989
- Recorded: August–October, 1988
- Studio: Pyramid Sound, Ithaca, New York, USA
- Genre: Crossover thrash
- Length: 38:45
- Label: Megaforce Records; Noise International
- Producer: Alex Perialas

M.O.D. chronology
Surfin' M.O.D. (1988)	Gross Misconduct (1989)	Rhythm of Fear (1992)

Professional ratings
Review scores
Source	Rating
AllMusic	3/5 stars

Gross Misconduct is the second album from crossover thrash metal band, M.O.D. It was released in 1989 on Megaforce Records and Noise International and follows 1988's extended play Surfin' M.O.D. It was three years until the band released another record, with Rhythm of Fear in 1992.

== Overview ==
The music video for "True Colors" starts off with a Slash look-alike plugging his guitar into the amp before being pushed out of the way by Billy Milano.

== Track listing ==
All songs written by M.O.D. unless otherwise stated

No.	Title	Writer(s)	Length
1.	"No Hope"	Alex Perialas, Billy Milano, Ferrero	4:12
2.	"No Glove No Love"		2:02
3.	"True Colors"		3:48
4.	"Accident Scene"		3:12
5.	"Godzula"		2:26
6.	"E Factor"		3:08
7.	"Gross Misconduct"		4:03
8.	"Satan's Cronies"		2:36
9.	"In the City" (Fear cover)		1:57
10.	"Come As You Are"	Perialas, Milano, Ferrero	2:45
11.	"Vent"		0:13
12.	"Theme"		2:06
13.	"P.B.M."		0:29
14.	"The Ride"	Perialas, Milano, Ferrero	5:00
15.	"Dark Knight"	Ferrero & Milano	5:58

== Credits ==
- Billy Milano – vocals
- Louis Svitek – guitar
- John Monte – bass
- Tim Mallare – drums
- Recorded August – October, 1988 at Pyramid Sound, Ithaca, New York, USA
- Produced and engineered by Alex Perialas
- Assistant engineered by Rob Hunter
- Executive produced by Jon and Marsha Zazula
- Mastered by Tom Coyne at Hit Factory
- Cover illustration by Craig Hamilton
