= Mind Funk (album) =

Studio album by Mind Funk
- Released: 1991
- Studios: El Sound, Copenhagen, Denmark
- Genres: Funk metal, alternative metal
- Length: 48:25
- Label: Epic
- Producers: Jan Eliasson, Mind Funk

Mind Funk chronology
Mind Funk (1991)	Dropped (1993)

Mind Funk is the debut studio album by American rock band Mind Funk, released in 1991 by Epic Records.

== Critical reception ==
Professional ratings
Review scores
Source	Rating
AllMusic	4/5 stars
The Encyclopedia of Popular Music	3/5 stars

Spin wrote that the album is "chock-full of eclectic musical styles merged with a liberal dose of vocalist Pat Dubar's arresting lyrics."

The Encyclopedia of Popular Music called the album "aggressive and confident". Trouser Press called it "a Spinal Tapped lunk-o-metal platter". In a retrospective article, Decibel called Mind Funk "smart alt-metal, the kind that most of us loved back in 1991 and 1992."

== Track listing ==
All songs written and arranged by Mind Funk.

1. "Sugar Ain't So Sweet" – 4:44
2. "Ride & Drive" – 3:43
3. "Bring It On" – 4:53
4. "Big House Burning" – 4:28
5. "Fire" – 6:36
6. "Blood Runs Red" – 4:03
7. "Sister Blue" – 5:58
8. "Woke Up This Morning" – 5:15
9. "Innocence" – 4:03
10. "Touch You" – 4:42

== Personnel ==
- Pat Dubar – lead vocals
- Louis Svitek – lead guitar
- Jason Coppola – rhythm guitar, backing vocals
- John Monte – bass, backing vocals
- Reed St. Mark – drums
- Jan Eliasson – producer
