= Busted, Broke & American =

Studio album by M.O.D.
- Released: July 7, 2017
- Recorded: 2014–2017
- Genre: Crossover thrash
- Length: 32:45
- Label: Megaforce Records

M.O.D. chronology
Red, White & Screwed (2007)	Busted, Broke & American (2017)

Busted, Broke & American is the eighth studio album by American crossover thrash band M.O.D., released on July 7, 2017. It is the band's first studio album in ten years, since Red, White & Screwed (2007), marking the longest gap between two studio albums in their career, and their first release on Megaforce Records since the compilation album Loved by Thousands, Hated by Millions (1995).

The album, which had been in the works for three years, has been referred to as the "Chinese Democracy of crossover thrash", due to its repeated delays. M.O.D. frontman Billy Milano had stated that this would be the band's final album, though they have since stated that they do not rule out releasing new material.

== Track listing ==
No.	Title	Length
1.	"Eisenhower"	0:28
2.	"The Final Declaration"	2:13
3.	"You're a Fucking Dick"	2:38
4.	"Busted, Broke & American"	3:02
5.	"Fight"	2:30
6.	"Hooligan"	3:24
7.	"Billy Be Damned"	2:36
8.	"Shattered Dreams & Broken Glass"	2:57
9.	"They"	2:53
10.	"All Out of Bubblegum"	0:53
11.	"Go Go Revolution"	3:51
12.	"Kennedy Speaks"	5:20
Total length:		32:45
