= Lucy Brown (disambiguation) =

Lucy Brown (born 1979) is an English actress.

Lucy Brown may also refer to:

- Lucy Brown (band), a 1990s Washington D.C. area funk-metal band
- Lucy Brown (1991 album)
- Lucy Barnes Brown (1859–1921), American amateur golfer
- Lucy Brown (tennis) (born 1993), British tennis player
- Lucy Brown, a character in The Threepenny Opera
- Lucy Hughes Brown (1863–1911), first African-American woman physician in South Carolina
- Lucy J. Brown (1933–2025), African-American activist and public official in Ithaca, New York
- Lucy Mabel Hall-Brown (1843–1907), American physician and writer
- Lucy Madox Brown (1843–1894), British artist, author and model
