= Affliction Clothing =

American clothing manufacturer

- Industry: Apparel
- Founded: 2005; 21 years ago
- Headquarters: Seal Beach, California, United States
- Products: Graphic T-shirts, denim, jackets, fleece, wovens and accessories
- Revenue: $100M (2008)
- Owner: Eric Foss, Courtney Dubar
- Website: www.afflictionclothing.com

Affliction Clothing is an American clothing manufacturer and retailer based in Seal Beach, California. It was launched in 2005 by Courtney Dubar and partners and is now owned by Affliction Holdings LLC. The company offers a wide range of products, including T-shirts, hoodies, swimwear, headwear, and watches.

== History ==
Prior to the founding of the company, Courtney Dubar had designed and printed merch designs for his brother Pat's band, Uniform Choice, using a screen printer he had purchased himself in a shed in his parents' back garden. Affliction Clothing was launched in 2005 by Courtney Dubar, Todd Beard, Eric Foss, and Clifton Chason.

Although he remained a partial owner, Beard resigned from the company in 2008 after Kim Couture, wife of UFC heavyweight champion Randy Couture, acquired a restraining order against Beard — who had exhibited a pattern of violence against women dating back to the 1990s. In 2012, Courtney Dubar (current CEO) bought Todd Beard's portions of the company, making him the majority shareholder. Beard passed away less than two years later.

== Products ==
Affliction's clothing line includes men's and women's T-shirts, polo shirts, thermals, button-downs, hoodies, denim, dresses, watches, headwear, shorts, and swimwear. While the company has deep roots in the MMA community, its "Live Fast" motto represents and appeals to audiences who appreciate a variety of disciplines and eras, such as rock and roll, moto culture, tattoos, vintage Americana, mixed martial arts, and impact sports. The Signature Series of Affliction shirts bear the logos of many of the world's top-ranked MMA fighters, including Randy Couture, Georges St-Pierre, Fedor Emelianenko, Quinton Jackson, and Renato Sobral, and boxers, including Oscar De La Hoya, Shane Mosley, and Zab Judah. Affliction has also produced signature shirts in collaboration with musicians like Avenged Sevenfold, Ozzy Osbourne, Black Sabbath, Haunted Mound, Megadeth, Pantera, Korn, Staind, Static-X, Testament, Shadows Fall, Atreyu, Behemoth, and Biohazard. MLB MVP Ryan Braun, a friend of Beard's, also launched a clothing line through Affliction in 2008.

Designs incorporate graphic images of angel wings, roses, skulls, skeletons, crosses, and swords.

Affliction was a longtime sponsor of the Ultimate Fighting Championship (UFC) and its fighters until 2008, when it broke ranks and formed Affliction Entertainment to compete with the UFC. As a result, UFC banned its fighters from wearing Affliction-branded clothing.

=== American Fighter ===
American Fighter is a clothing and sports equipment company. Trademarked in 2006, it became a registered trademark of Affliction Holdings LLC on April 22, 2008. Several fighters have been sponsored by this sub-brand, including Rich Franklin.

=== Rebel Saints ===
Rebel Saints was trademarked by Affliction Holdings LLC on September 27, 2011. The line of clothing is sold primarily at Spencer's Gifts.

=== Sinful ===
Sinful is a clothing line specifically designed for women as part of Affliction Inc. and is the sister brand to Affliction men's clothing. Its T-shirts, pants, and hoodies often feature a mix of spirited elements, including angels, angel wings, doves, crosses, burning hearts, roses, and skulls.

=== Throwdown ===
Throwdown was founded as a hard goods company, positioning its products and services within the market of mixed martial arts and the combative sports industry. Affliction joined forces with Throwdown to develop a full clothing brand in order to complement the already successful hard goods line with items such as protective gear, training bags, cages, and rings. Throwdown clothing is sold internationally.

=== Xtreme Couture ===
Xtreme Couture clothing was founded in 2006 by Affliction, in a partnership with Randy Couture.

== Sponsorship ==
In June 2011, Affliction sponsored a photo contest in which the prize was a custom Harley-Davidson worth $25,000 or $12,000. These motorcycles were:

- A men's 2010 Harley-Davidson Softail 'crossbones' American Customs Harley-Davidson customized motorcycle with 1584 Twin Cam 96B counterbalanced engine – worth about $25,000 after customizations.
- A women's 2010 Sportster 883 American Customs Harley-Davidson customized motorcycle with low rubber-mounted 883cc Evolution engine – worth about $12,000 after customizations.

== See also ==
- Mixed martial arts clothing
