= Rhythm of Fear =

Studio album by M.O.D.
- Released: 1992
- Recorded: Trax East Studios, South River, New Jersey, USA
- Genre: Crossover thrash
- Length: 30:44
- Label: Megaforce Records
- Producer: Steve Evetts; Billy Milano

M.O.D. chronology
Gross Misconduct (1989)	Rhythm of Fear (1992)	Devolution (1994)

Professional ratings
Review scores
Source	Rating
Allmusic	3/5 stars

Rhythm of Fear is the third full-length studio album from American crossover thrash band, M.O.D. It was released in 1992 on Megaforce Records and follows 1989's Gross Misconduct. In 1994, the band subsequently released Devolution.

Line-up changes saw Billy Milano take up bass duties as well as vocals, and Dave Chavarri replacing Tim Mallare on drums after the latter's departure to New Jersey thrash band, Overkill. Tim McMurtrie rejoined the band after having appeared on the debut album, U.S.A. for M.O.D., in 1987.

== Track listing ==
All songs written by M.O.D.

No.	Title	Length
1.	"Objection/Dead End"	4:04
2.	"Get Up and Dance"	2:59
3.	"Step by Step"	2:52
4.	"Rhymestein"	2:38
5.	"Minute of Courage"	1:29
6.	"Irresponsible"	2:29
7.	"Override Negative"	3:43
8.	"I, the Earth"	1:52
9.	"Spy vs. Spy"	1:54
10.	"Intruder"	2:27
11.	"Jive Time Jimmy's Revenge"	2:38
12.	"Rally (NYC)"	1:39

== Credits ==
- Billy Milano – vocals, bass
- Tim McMurtrie – guitar
- Dave Chavarri – drums
- Mark Mays – additional guitar
- Recorded at Trax East Studios, South River, New Jersey, USA
- Produced, engineered, and mixed by Steve Evetts
- Additional production by Billy Milano
- Assistant engineered by Greg Gasparino and Eric Rachel
