= People Who Fell from the Sky =

Studio album by Mind Funk
- Released: 1995
- Recorded: Warzone1 Recorders
- Genre: Stoner rock; grunge
- Length: 46:24
- Label: Music for Nations
- Producer: Van Christie, Mind Funk

Mind Funk chronology
| Dropped (1993) | People Who Fell from the Sky (1995) |

Professional ratings
Review scores
| Source | Rating |
|---|---|
| AllMusic | 3/5 stars |

People Who Fell from the Sky is the third and final studio album by American rock band Mind Funk.

== Track listing ==
1. "Rift Valley Fever – 4:22"
2. "Superchief – 4:55"
3. "Seasick – 4:55"
4. "Deep End – 4:28"
5. "People Who Fell from the Sky – 3:17"
6. "Weird Water – 3:01"
7. "Aluna – 6:18"
8. "1000 Times – 3:47"
9. "Kill the Messenger – 5:40"
10. "Acrobats Falling – 5:41"

== Personnel ==
- Patrick Dubar – lead vocals
- Louis Svitek – guitars, backing vocals
- Frank Ciampi – bass
- Shawn Johnson – drums
- Van Christie – producer
