= Dictated Aggression =

Studio album by M.O.D.
- Released: June 25, 1996
- Recorded: Explosive Sound Design, Hoboken, New Jersey, USA
- Genre: Crossover thrash
- Length: 41:47
- Label: Music For Nations
- Producer: Billy Milano

M.O.D. chronology
Loved by Thousands (1995)	Dictated Aggression (1996)	The Rebel You Love to Hate (2003)

Alternative cover
- Blackout Records re-issue cover

Professional ratings
Review scores
Source	Rating
Allmusic	3/5 stars

Dictated Aggression is the fifth full-length studio album from American crossover thrash band M.O.D. It was released in 1996 on Music For Nations and follows 1994's studio album, Devolution. Blackout Records subsequently re-issued the album with a different cover and enhanced CD content of a live concert in France.

This would be the band's last album until 2003's The Rebel You Love to Hate, although Billy Milano did appear on Bigger Than the Devil – an S.O.D. reunion album in 1999.

== Track listing ==
All songs written by Billy Milano

No.	Title	Length
1.	"Dictated Aggression"	2:25
2.	"Silence Your Sin"	3:03
3.	"Damaged"	2:49
4.	"Shot Glass"	3:27
5.	"Stand or Fall"	3:28
6.	"One Was Johnny"	5:04
7.	"Nation"	1:20
8.	"Empty Vision"	3:10
9.	"In My Shoes"	3:05
10.	"U.S. Dreams"	2:41
11.	"Hippypottomus"	2:23
12.	"Just Got Fired"	2:23
13.	"Whiteout"	2:56
14.	"Brutal Beats"	3:33

== Enhanced CD content ==
- Live at Club Bikini, Toulouse, France – September 14, 1993 – 19:42

== Personnel ==
- Billy Milano – vocals, guitar, bass
- Joe Young – guitar
- Dave Chavarri – drums
- Recorded at Explosive Sound Design, Hoboken, New Jersey, USA
- Produced and engineered by Billy Milano
- Programming, engineered and mixed by Clinton Bradley
- Original cover art by Anthony Ferrara
- Re-issue cover art by Rick Rios

== Trivia ==
- Billy Milano also co-produced Something's Gotta Give, an album by New York hardcore band, Agnostic Front, at the Explosive Sound Design studios in Hoboken, New Jersey
- The first part of the live concert in the enhanced CD content can be found on the Devolution re-issue
