= Billy Milano =

American vocalist

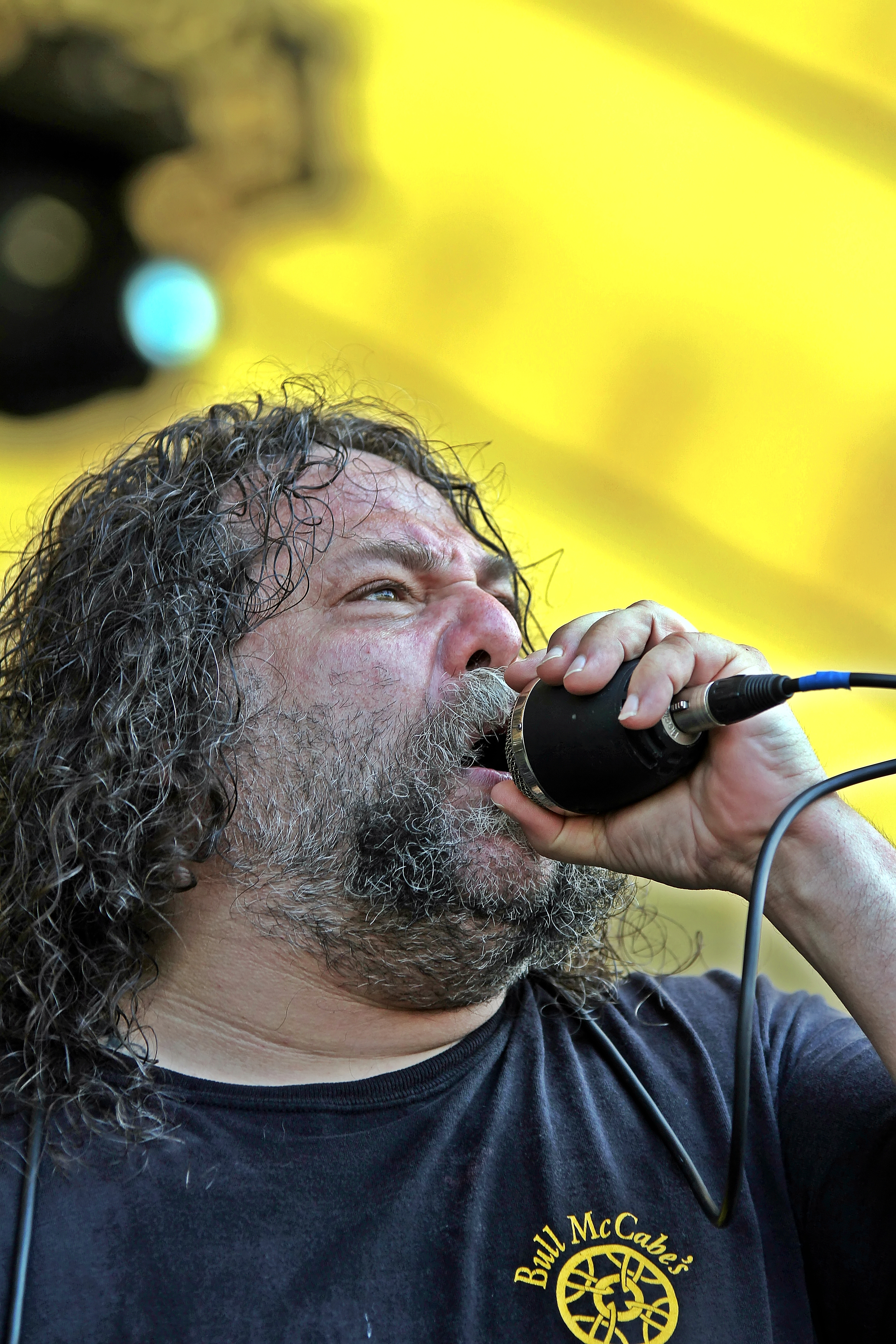
- Milano performing in 2014

Background information
- Also known as: Mosh, Sgt D.
- Born: William John Massie; June 5, 1964 (age 62)
- Genres: Heavy metal, thrash metal, crossover thrash, hardcore punk
- Occupations: Singer, musician, songwriter
- Instruments: Vocals, guitar, bass
- Years active: 1981–present
- Website: milanomosh.com

Billy Milano (born June 5, 1964) is an American heavy metal and hardcore punk musician. He is the singer and occasionally guitarist and bassist of crossover thrash band M.O.D., and was the singer of its predecessor, Stormtroopers of Death. Before these bands, Milano played bass in early New York hardcore band the Psychos, which also launched the career of future Agnostic Front vocalist Roger Miret. Milano was also the singer of United Forces, which included his Stormtroopers of Death bandmate Dan Lilker. Milano managed a number of bands, including Agnostic Front, for whom he also co-produced the 1997 Epitaph Records release Something's Gotta Give and roadie for Anthrax.

== Discography ==
=== Stormtroopers of Death albums ===
Date of release	Title	Label	Chart positions	US sales
August 30, 1985	Speak English or Die	Megaforce Records		
October 24, 1992	Live at Budokan	Megaforce Records		
May 22, 1999	Bigger than the Devil	Nuclear Blast	The single "Seasoning the Obese" was given away for a limited time when Bigger than the Devil came out.	
August 21, 2007	Rise of the Infidels	Nuclear Blast		

=== Stormtroopers of Death videos ===
Date of Release	Title	Label	Chart positions	US sales
January 23, 2001	Kill Yourself: The Movie (DVD/VHS)	Nuclear Blast		
September 25, 2001	Speak English or Live (DVD)	Megaforce Entertainment		
July 26, 2005	20 Years of Dysfunction	Nuclear Blast		

=== Method of Destruction (M.O.D.) ===
Year	Title	Label	Chart peak
1987	U.S.A. for M.O.D.	Megaforce Records	153
1988	Surfin' M.O.D. (EP)	Megaforce Records	186
1989	Gross Misconduct	Megaforce Records	151
1992	Rhythm of Fear	Megaforce Records	—
1994	Devolution	Music for Nations	—
1995	Loved by Thousands, Hated by Millions (compilation)	Megaforce Records	—
1996	Dictated Aggression	Music for Nations	—
2003	The Rebel You Love to Hate	Nuclear Blast	—
2007	Red, White & Screwed	Index Entertainment	—
2017	Busted, Broke & American	Megaforce Records	—

=== Mastery ===
Date of Release	Title	Label	Chart positions	US sales
May 14, 2012	In the Key of Kill	Picture Black		
