= Mixed martial arts clothing =

Sportswear worn in mixed martial arts

MMA clothing refers to the sportswear worn in mixed martial arts (MMA) competition and training, and branded fashion clothing related to the mixed martial arts scene. As MMA becomes a mature sport, brands dedicated to it have worked toward specializing clothing that improve an MMA athlete's training and competition.

== Overview ==
MMA gloves and MMA shorts (similar to the shorts worn in boxing and Muay Thai) are the only piece of clothing allowed to be worn during professional MMA competitions. However, Amateur MMA, regulated by International Mixed Martial Arts Federation, requires shin-instep. This type of clothing is often referred to as fightwear to differentiate it from MMA fashion clothing which includes t-shirts, hoodies, caps and hats.

There are various types of MMA fightshorts, including board shorts, shorts which extend halfway down the thigh, shorts which extend only slightly down the thigh and gladiator shorts which feature slits in the sides of the legs.

Several clothing brands have developed their own lines of MMA apparel including Affliction Clothing, No Fear, Eckō Unltd. and Emerson Brand Apparel.

The overall revenues of sales of MMA clothing come to hundreds of millions of dollars a year, with both TapouT and Affliction recording sales in excess of $100 million.

== Mixed Martial Arts Shorts ==
The Unified Rules of MMA provide clear guidelines around the shorts used during professional and amateur MMA bouts. These rules have provided a benchmark for apparel companies to design and develop training and competition shorts for mixed martial arts and related sports. MMA shorts have now evolved from regular board shorts or biking shorts. They are now much more specialized and provide several features to improve comfort, range of motion and flexibility, and additional characteristics that improve a fighter's ability during practice and competition.

The most prominent style of MMA Shorts is essentially board shorts, with an extra drawstring for added grip, and a 4-way flexible panel in the inner thigh area for maximum flexibility. They are also made from sweat-wicking material. Another type of MMA shorts that is less common is spats shorts, made of spandex and polyester mixture, and fits tightly on the body. It's the equivalent of a rash guard but in shorts. Many companies are manufacturing this kind of specialty shorts. Long spats were allowed before in MMA competitions, but for are now ruled out for their added grip and friction.

== Mixed Martial Arts Shirts ==
Most MMA fighters train using specialized compression tops, called rash guards. Rash guards are not regular compression shirts. Ground training techniques have required that these shirts provide reinforced seams and stitching, with additional panels to support the additional stress placed on the shirt during training while continuing to provide the benefits provided by regular compression shirts. Aside from the reinforced stitching, many rash guards also have an added rubber or gel panel on the bottom to ensure minimum rolling up during training. Rash guards are used for several reasons, like guarding against rashes and skin infections, their sweat-wicking abilities, and the extra compression that regulates the body temperature and gives added protection against injuries.

In addition to rash guards, several promotions like the UFC, regularly provide sponsors with the ability to advertise their brands using t-shirts during the weigh-in events and competition. These shirts have been titled "Walk-out" shirts by many because they are used by fighters while being presented for their fight as they walk towards the cage. These shirts are sold to the public as a means for the fans to support their favorite fighters.

== See also ==
- Keikogi
- Sportswear
