= Freedom Is a State of Mind =

Studio album by Corporate Avenger
- Released: July 10, 2001
- Recorded: Electric Ghetto Studios (Venice, CA); Can-Am Studios (Tarzana, CA)
- Genres: Industrial hip hop; rap rock; nu metal
- Length: 45:53
- Label: Suburban Noize
- Producers: Daddy X (also exec.); Mike Kumagai

Corporate Avenger chronology
The New Testament (2000)	Freedom Is a State of Mind (2001)	Born Again (2005)

Professional ratings
Review scores
Source	Rating
AllMusic	3/5 stars

Freedom Is a State of Mind is the debut full-length studio album by American rap rock band Corporate Avenger. It consists of songs from the band's previous releases, Taxes Are Stealing and The New Testament, in addition to several new songs that evolved the band's sound and message. It was released on July 10, 2001, via Suburban Noize Records/Koch Records.

== Track listing ==
No.	Title	Length
1.	"Blessing"	0:52
2.	"Fault the Police (I Don't)"	3:48
3.	"Christians Murdered Indians"	5:17
4.	"FBI File"	3:50
5.	"Taxes Are Stealing"	4:49
6.	"The Bible Is Bullshit"	4:51
7.	"Voting Doesn't Work"	3:40
8.	"Web of Lies"	4:16
9.	"$20 Bill"	4:20
10.	"Jesus Christ Homosexual"	3:12
11.	"Pig Is a Pig"	3:32
12.	"Drug Dealing God" (featuring Kottonmouth Kings)	4:21
13.	"Heaven's Joke"	6:43
Total length:		45:53

Note

- The song "Christians Murdered Indians" includes a spoken word section referencing Bartolomé de las Casas' work A Short Account of the Destruction of the Indies, in the section "Of the Island HISPANIOLA", which describes specific acts of violence by Spanish soldiers against indigenous peoples of the Americas.

== Personnel ==
- Patrick Dubar – vocals
- Spike Xavier – vocals
- DJ Hall of Records – scratches (tracks: 3, 4, 7, 8, 9, 12)
- Robert Adams – scratches (tracks: 2, 5)
- Brad Xavier – producer, executive producer
- Mike Kumagai – producer, mixing (tracks: 1, 3, 4, 7, 9, 12, 13), engineering
- Phil Kaffel – mixing (tracks: 2, 5, 6, 8, 10, 11)
- Tom Baker – mastering
- Kevin Zinger – management
- Jeff Gilligan – design & art direction
- Fabrice Hessens – photography
- Jason Timms – photography
