= Sweaty Nipples =

American rock band

- L–R: Brian Lehfeldt, Scott Heard, Dave Merrick, Davey Nipples, Hans Wagner, Ryan Moore

Background information
- Origin: Portland, Oregon, U.S.
- Genres: Punk, funk metal, grunge, alternative metal, industrial, thrash metal
- Years active: 1987 – c. 1997
- Labels: Megaforce, Elemental
- Past members: Scotty Heard; Brian Lehfeldt; Dave Merrick; Ryan Moore; Davey Nipples; Hans Wagner; Eric French; Bradley Mowen

Sweaty Nipples was an American rock band from Portland, Oregon, active in the 1980s and 90s. The band released two albums before splitting up. AllMusic described their music as "a mixture of punk, industrial and grunge". Another reviewer described them as a "goofy funk band". Spokesman-Review called them a "thrash-metal-industrial-funk" band.

On October 10, 2026 Sweaty Nipples were inducted into the Oregon Music Hall of Fame at the Aladdin Theater in Portland, Oregon.

== History ==
The band formed in Portland in 1987. Band members included Davey Nipples (guitar, bass), Bradley Mowen (drums), Brian Lehfeldt (vocals, drums), Eric French (bass), Dave Merrick (vocals, samples), and Ryan Moore (guitar).

Sweaty Nipples released the album Straight Outta Portland in 1989. They recorded a second album in 1991 but record label NastyMix filing for bankruptcy meant that it was not released. Building up a reputation from their live shows, the band won Portland Music Awards in 1991 for Best Alternative/Metal Act and in 1992 for Best Live Show. They played on the Lollapalooza tour in 1992.

With new members Scott Heard (vocals, guitar) and Hans Wagner (drums), the band signed with Megaforce in 1993, and released a self-titled EP followed by the album Bug Harvest, which sold more than 30,000 copies.

With Megaforce's demise, the band signed with Elemental and released the album Thrill Crazed Space Kids Blasting the Flesh Off Humans in 1996.

The band's music was featured in some of the "Play It Loud" advertisements for Nintendo products in the early 1990s.

== Members ==
- Scott Heard – vocals, guitar
- Brian Lehfeldt – drums, vocals
- Dave Merrick – piccolo bass, vocals, samples
- Ryan Moore – guitar, keyboards, vocals
- Davey Nipples – guitar, bass, vocals
- Basil (Mike Ternyik) - drums, vocals, muscles
- Hans Wagner – drums, percussion, vocals
- Eric French – bass
- Bradley Mowen – drums, vocals
- Les Evans - guitar, vocals

== Discography ==
=== Albums ===
- Straight Outta Portland (1989), Media Blitz
- Bug Harvest (1994), Megaforce
- Thrill Crazed Space Kids Blasting the Flesh Off Humans (1996), Elemental

=== EPs ===
- "What's Your Funktion?" (1989)
- Sweaty Nipples (1993), Megaforce

=== Singles ===
- "Chickensnake" (1991), Tim/Kerr
