= A Covenant of Thorns =

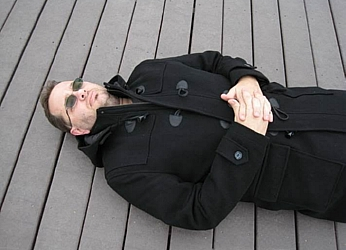
- Scott-David Allen (2016)

Background information
- Origin: Seattle, Washington, U.S.
- Genres: Synth-pop, darkwave, alternative rock
- Years active: 1992–present
- Label: A Handful of Nothing
- Members: Scott-David Allen
- Website: acovenantofthorns.com

A Covenant of Thorns is an American electronic music project formed in 1992 by multi-instrumentalist and singer-songwriter Scott-David Allen. Originally based in Seattle, the project is associated with the darkwave and synth-pop genres. Since its inception, A Covenant of Thorns has operated primarily as a solo endeavor, with Allen responsible for the songwriting, instrumentation, and production. The project has released several studio albums and EPs, gaining a presence within the underground electronic and gothic rock scenes.

== History ==
=== 1992–1999: Formation and Hallowed & Hollow ===
A Covenant of Thorns was founded in 1992 by Scott-David Allen following a move from San Francisco to Seattle. While attending art school, Allen released two self-titled EPs in 1998, followed by the 1999 debut full-length album, Hallowed & Hollow. The project's early sound was characterized by atmospheric synth-pop and darkwave influences.

=== 2000–2013: If The Heavens Should Fall and hiatus ===
In 2004, the second studio album, If The Heavens Should Fall, was released. Following this, the project entered a period of relative inactivity regarding new studio material. In 2010, the project's debut material was remastered for a ten-year anniversary digital reissue.

=== 2014–2018: Shadows & Serenades ===
Allen resumed the project in 2014 with the EP The Fields of Flesh, followed by the 2017 release Requiem. In 2018, the project released Shadows & Serenades, its first full-length studio album in fourteen years. The album's production and vocal delivery were noted by genre-specific critics as a shift toward a more refined sound.

=== 2020–Present: Black and Ashes ===
In 2020, Allen released the album Black, which moved toward a more minimalist electronic style. In 2023, the album Ashes was released. In 2022, A Covenant of Thorns was part of the Procession Magazine/Cleopatra compilation The Unquiet Grave: The Final Chapter as well as the Psychedelic Furs tribute, Heartbreak Beat (A Tribute to The Psychedelic Furs).

== Discography ==
=== Studio albums ===
- Hallowed & Hollow (1999)
- If The Heavens Should Fall (2004)
- Shadows & Serenades (2018)
- Black (2020)
- Ashes (2023)

=== EPs ===
- A Covenant of Thorns 1 (1998)
- A Covenant of Thorns 2 (1998)
- The Fields of Flesh (2014)
- Forgotten (2016)
- Requiem (2017)

=== Compilations ===
- MP32K - The Future Is Now (1999)
- Shadow Dancing (2000)
- Trinity (2002)
- Angelic Hauntings (2005)
- Tiny Gods Who Walk Beside Us (2020)
- The Unquiet Grave: The Final Chapter (2022)
- Heartbreak Beat (A Tribute to The Psychedelic Furs) (2022)

=== Remixes ===
- Dahlia (Phosphene Dreams Mix) - Remixed by The Joy Thieves

== See also ==
- Synthpop
- Darkwave
