= I Ya Toyah =

Musical artist

- Born: Ania Tarnowska
- Origin: Łódź, Poland / Chicago, United States
- Genre: electro-industrial
- Occupations: Singer-songwriter, multi-instrumentalist, producer, solo performer
- Years active: 2018-present
- Label: Femme Fatale Records
- Website: https://www.iyatoyah.com/

Ania Tarnowska, known professionally as I Ya Toyah, is a Chicago, USA musician, singer, composer, producer, performer, and the founder/CEO of Femme Fatale Records label. Her genre-bending music incorporates elements of multiple genres including industrial, electro-industrial, goth electro, punk electro, electronic rock, metal, and synthwave. It best fits in the alternative music category.

When spoken out loud in Polish, I Ya Toyah means “It’s Just Me.” Her logo art merges the symbols for peace and anarchy that symbolizes her “rebel psyche.”

== History ==
Born and raised in Łódź, Poland, Ania began her music education as a child, studying classical guitar, piano, vocal performance, and music theory. She moved to the United States as a young adult, and soon became a part of multiple musical projects, performing with metal, punk rock jazz, and progressive rock bands in prominent venues across the US.

In 2016, she graduated as the valedictorian from SAE Institute, where she focused on Music Business and Audio Engineering. In 2017, she began working at her home studio on her solo project, I Ya Toyah, and her debut album, Code Blue, was released independently on Oct. 26th, 2018. True to her motto, she spent the majority of 2019 “spreading the disease of music and infecting the human race” by touring.

She began releasing her music independently in 2018, with 4 single releases, followed by her self-recorded and self-produced debut album, Code Blue. In 2019, she released 5 singles, participated in many collaborations, became a member of post-industrial supergroup, The Joy Thieves and toured excessively with bands such as Pigface and Zwaremachine. In 2020, she released 2 singles and a double album of remixes titled Code Blue Reloaded plus bonus album Code Blue Revelations. In 2021 Out of Order - a 5 chapters E.P. consisting of five singles and music videos came out in both digital and physical forms. 2022 brought I Ya Toyah on the US East Coast Tour, and marked her first acoustic EP release Ghosts. In 2023 I Ya Toyah performed at Dark Force Fest, NJ, followed by her first month long West Coast tour in May. In August and September 2023 she toured as a direct opener for Stabbing Westward She closed the concert season performing a headlining set at Dark City Festival in New Orleans.

On October 27 she released a Panic Room single, produced with Walter Flakus of Stabbing Westward. This and more singles lead to the I am the Fire EP release released April 5. To promote her new music in live settings, I Ya Toyah went on a 45-day all American tour with Orgy and Cold in April / May 2024. After performing Cold Waves Festival in Metro, Chicago she released a full DRAMA record in October 2024. In November/December 2024 she is embarking on her first European tour joining Front Line Assembly. In March/May 2025 she joins Wednesday 13, Stitched Up Heart and Dead Rabbitts on the all American There's No Such Things As Monsters Tour 2025.

In October 2025, I Ya Toyah released an Aesthetic Perfection remix of “Denial,” featuring Daniel Graves. In November, she returned to Europe as support for Beasto Blanco on the band’s Kinetica Tour. In May 2026, I Ya Toyah toured with Front Line Assembly. She also began a new series of recordings produced and mixed with Johnny K and mastered by Howie Weinberg. “Feelings” was released on May 1, followed by “Apology” on June 26. On August 21, she released a cover of Nine Inch Nails’ “Closer,” completing a trilogy of releases exploring identity, emotional response and external validation.

On November 20, 2026, I Ya Toyah released the EP ERROR PROSPECT: HUMAN through her Femme Fatale Records. The 11-track project combines industrial rock and electronic music with spoken-word interludes addressing themes of emotional vulnerability, ego, identity and social acceptance. The EP was produced by I Ya Toyah and Johnny K, mixed by Johnny K and mastered by Howie Weinberg. It includes a cover of Nine Inch Nails' "Closer" and a techno remix created with Blush Response. The release was accompanied by a 32-page hardcover art book featuring lyrics, original writing, photography and personal reflections. The spoken-word chapters are included in the physical CD edition but are absent from conventional streaming versions.

== Remixes ==
I Ya Toyah's music has been remixed by artists, including The Anix, Skold (Marilyn Manson, Shotgun Messiah, KMFDM, Motionless in White), Gopal Metro (the co-founder of the Gothic Rock band, Bella Morte), Rhys Fulber (Front Line Assembly, Conjure One), Adoration Destroyed, The Joy Thieves, Stabbing Westward , Aesthetic Perfection, and more (See full discography below.)

== Collaborations ==
In 2019 I Ya Toyah recorded music with artists such as Julian Beeston (Nitzer Ebb, Cubanate), Mach Fox (Zwaremachine), Indign, and Traumabond. That year she also became a member of The Joy Thieves, a post-industrial super group that includes current, former, and touring members of bands such as Ministry, Revolting Cocks, Pigface, Marilyn Manson, Stabbing Westward, Nitzer Ebb, KMFDM, My Life With the Thrill Kill Kult, Blue October, 16VOLT, and more.

In March 2020, she also started working as a composer, alongside movie director, Ralph Klisiewicz, creating the score for a short film called The Artifact.

In the Fall 2023 I Ya Toyah announced the releases of new singles, I am the Fire EP and album DRAMA, produced together with Walter Flakus of Stabbing Westward

== Social awareness and causes ==
As a suicide loss survivor, I Ya Toyah advocates for the importance of mental wellness, and ending the stigma that surrounds mental illness. During her live performances, she often talks about mental health with her audience, communicating the significance of breaking the stigma. Her ‘Code Blue’ album focuses on mental health and suicide prevention, and 15% of all proceeds go to the American Foundation for Suicide Prevention (AFSP). In July 2020, she organized an Art Auction for Mental Health During the Times of Pandemic. Artists from across the US created and donated art pieces that were inspired by her lyrical content, and all the proceeds aided the AFSP. In December 2022 I Ya Toyah released a self-funded line of suicide prevention and mental health wristbands promoting 988 Crisis Line, available for free with free shipping across the USA.

In April 2019, I Ya Toyah released a single and a video titled Forbidden Bark, which featured her dog, Benek. The release was used as a platform to raise awareness for charity organizations that focus on fighting animal cruelty. Benek was featured again in May 2022 as I Ya Toyah performed a live streamed show during Goths For Sanctuaries Festival raising money for animal sanctuaries around the world.

In 2020, her song Funeral for Love was selected to be a part of ESA (Electronic Saviors: Industrial Music to Cure Cancer) compilation released by Metropolis Records/Distortion Productions. This version of the song, featuring Traumabond appeared on this release, alongside bands such as Ego Likeness, The Clay People, Leæther Strip, Angelspit, <PIG>, Die Warzau, Caustic, God Module, Skatenigs, and Cyanotic.

In Spring 2022 I Ya Toyah participated in the recording of a version of the Beatles’ classic Come Together to raise funds for the people of the war-torn country of Ukraine. The project named Lifeline International was arranged and mixed by legendary music producer John Fryer, who has worked with such seminal bands as Nine Inch Nails, Depeche Mode, and Cocteau Twins. Participants included members of Faith No More, Stabbing Westward, Ministry, Rammstein, Filter, THE HARDKISS, The Joy Thieves, Agnostic Front, Basement Jaxx, and more.

== Discography ==
=== Singles ===
- Code Blue - 2018
- Farewell - Mirrors Don’t Lie - 2018
- Funeral For Love - 2018
- Glass Eyes - 2018
- Funeral For Love (remix by Gopal Metro Invasion) -2019
- Forbidden Bark (feat. Benek the Dog) - 2019
- Flashback (remix by Rhys Fulber) - 2019
- Puppet (remix by Adoration Destroyed) - 2019
- Glass Eyes (remix by The Joy Thieves) - 2019
- Motion (remix by Skold) - 2020
- It’s No Good (cover of Depeche Mode) - 2020
- Out of Order - 2021
- Concrete - 2021
- Pray - 2021
- Death's Kiss - 2021
- Vast Spaces - 2021
- Pray (remix by Stabbing Westward) - 2021
- Vast Spaces (remix by The Joy Thieves) - 2022
- Code Blue (acoustic) - 2022
- Pray (acoustic) - 2022
- Time Machine (acoustic) - 2022
- Panic Room - 2023
- Panic Room (remix by The Anix) - 2023
- Dream not to Dream - 2024
- Dream not to Dream (remix by Chris Hall - Stabbing Westward) - 2024
- I am the Fire - 2024
- Denial - 2024
- Fraud - 2024
- Afterlight - 2024
- Hello, Hello? - 2024
- Drama - 2024
- Crashing Comet - 2024
- Caves - 2024
- Denial (Aesthetic Perfection Remix) (featuring Daniel Graves) (2025)
- Feelings (2026)
- Apology (2026)
- Closer (Nine Inch Nails cover) (2026)
- White Walls (2026)

=== Albums and EPs ===
- Code Blue - 2018
- Code Blue Reloaded (remix album) - 2020
- Code Blue Revelations (bonus remix album) - 2020
- Out of Order - 2021
- Ghosts (acoustic EP) - 2022
- I am the Fire - 2024
- DRAMA - 2024
- ERROR PROSPECT: HUMAN - 2026

=== Collaborative releases and compilations ===
- Smile That Killed the Country (with Max Fox of Zwaremachine) - 2019
- Cities in Dust (with The Joy Thieves) - 2019
- Autumn Storm (with Indign) - 2020
- Electronic Saviors: Funeral for Love feat.Traumabond ( Metropolis Records) - 2020
- Tiny Gods Who Walk Beside Us - 2020
- Tear Down The Walls: A Riveting Tribute To Pink Floyd's The Wall (Riveting Music) with The Joy Thieves - 2020
- The Unquiet Grave (Cleopatra Records) - 2020
- We The People (Featured by Julian Beeston) - 2021
- Higher Than The Sun (Featured by Julian Beeston) - 2021
- Crazy Horses (Featured by Julian Beeston) - 2021
- Broken Hearts & Robot Parts, Volume II (COP International) - 2021
- Follow The Leaders (A Killing Joke Tribute) by Coitus Interruptus Productions - Money is Not Out God with The Joy Thieves - 2021
- Come Together (with Lifeline International) - 2022
- Talkin' Bout The Wolf (with Jonathan/Christian) - 2022
- Love is a Battlefield (with The Joy Thieves) - 2022
- King of Everything (with REVillusion) - 2024
