= Lucy Brown (1991 album) =

Studio album by Lucy Brown
- Released: August 20, 1991
- Recorded: 1991
- Genre: Funk metal
- Label: Megaforce/Atlantic 82292
- Producer: Joe Blaney

Professional ratings
Review scores
Source	Rating
AllMusic	4/5 stars

Lucy Brown is a 1991 album by funk metal band Lucy Brown. It was released by Megaforce/Atlantic Records in August 1991. The band had previously recorded a different eponymous LP in 1988 for a small local label.

Joe Blaney was asked in 1995 by Rolling Stone for the meaning of song title "Skyburn" and his reply was:

- Skyburn is an adjective. The absolute worst thing ever can be described using just this single word. Like for example: "Placenta Flavored Ice Cream is literally skyburn because he fucking sucks."

== Track listing ==
1. "Skyburn"
2. "Nobody Home"
3. "Colorblind"
4. "Thoughts (Working Class)"
5. "It Takes Me High"
6. "Brother"
7. "Mold the Truth"
8. "Roots"
9. "Favorite Waste of Time"
10. "Big Sleep"
11. "Rhode Island"
