= Red, White & Screwed =

Studio album by M.O.D.
- Released: October 9, 2007
- Recorded: Musiclab, Texas
- Genre: Crossover thrash
- Length: 48:40
- Label: Index Entertainment
- Producer: Scott Lee Sargeant; Billy Milano; Derek Lopez

M.O.D. chronology
The Rebel You Love to Hate (2003)	Red, White & Screwed (2007)	Busted, Broke & American (2017)

Red White & Screwed is the seventh studio album from American crossover thrash band, M.O.D. It was released in 2007 on Index Entertainment and follows 2003's The Rebel You Love to Hate. After the release of the album Milano disbanded M.O.D., but they returned as a touring unit in 2013 and would not release another album until ten years later.

== Track listing ==
All songs written by Scott Lee Sargeant, Derek Lopez, and Billy Milano

No.	Title	Length
1.	"Balls on Bread"	3:10
2.	"Alphabet City Stomp"	2:54
3.	"Red White and Screwed"	4:00
4.	"Dance Around With Snakes"	2:35
5.	"The Big It"	4:16
6.	"Hardcore Harry"	2:23
7.	"I Gotta Get Away"	3:49
8.	"Speaking Truth to Power"	2:38
9.	"Jose Can You See?"	3:36
10.	"Suicide Bomb Pop"	4:04
11.	"Bullshit Politics"	4:35
12.	"We Are Nothing"	2:59
13.	"G.L.E.T. (Greatest Lie Ever Told)"	4:40
14.	"Goddess / Devil" (Bonus Track)	3:16

== Credits ==
- Billy Milano – vocals, bass
- Scott Lee Sargeant – guitar, vocals
- Derek Lopez – drums
- Recorded at Musiclab, Austin, Texas, USA
- Engineered by Tim Gerron
- Tech work by Kenneth 'Twizz' Johnson
- Mastered by Jerry Tubb
- Artwork by Sjouke Bakker
- Graphic design & layout by John Warner
- Produced by Tim Gerron, Scott Lee Sargeant, and Billy Milano
- Mixed at Musiclab, Austin, Texas by Tim Gerron, Scott Lee Sargeant, and Billy Milano
