= The Rebel You Love to Hate =

Studio album by M.O.D.
- Released: May 20, 2003
- Recorded: Big Blue Meenie, Jersey City, New Jersey, USA
- Genre: Crossover thrash
- Length: 54:45
- Label: Nuclear Blast Records
- Producers: Paul Crook; Billy Milano; Scott Metaxes

M.O.D. chronology
Dictated Aggression (1996)	The Rebel You Love to Hate (2003)	Red, White & Screwed (2007)

Professional ratings
Review scores
Source	Rating
Allmusic	1.5/5 stars
Alternative Press	1/5

The Rebel You Love to Hate is the sixth full-length studio album from American crossover thrash band, M.O.D. It was released in 2003 on Nuclear Blast Records and follows 1996's Dictated Aggression. It was followed in 2007 by Red, White & Screwed The album saw longer songs and a harder sound and in the intervening years since their last album, a new guitarist and drummer, as Milano once again shuffled the personnel around him. The cover is a reference to the logo of The Michael Schenker Group.

== Track listing ==
All songs written by Billy Milano

No.	Title	Length
1.	"Wigga"	3:50
2.	"The Rebel You Love to Hate"	5:08
3.	"Makin' Friends is Fun"	3:45
4.	"De Men of Stein"	4:14
5.	"Rage Against the Mac Machine"	5:03
6.	"Get Ready"	3:22
7.	"Ass-Ghanistan"	2:44
8.	"He's Dead Jim"	1:59
9.	"Get Ready"	5:29
10.	"Rebel (808)"	5:08
11.	"Rage Against the Mac Machine" (Radio Edit)	5:04
12.	"Wigga" (Radio Edit)	3:52
13.	"Rebel" (Radio Edit)	5:07

== Credits ==
- Billy Milano – vocals, bass
- Joe Affe – guitar
- Danny Burkhardt – drums
- Recorded at Big Blue Meenie, Jersey City, New Jersey, USA
- Produced by Paul Crook and Billy Milano
- Additional production by Scott Metaxes
- Engineered by Erin Farley
- Additionally engineered by Tim Gilles
- Mixed at Watermusic Studio, Hoboken, New Jersey by Billy Milano and Dan Korneff
