= Pat Dubar =

American singer

- Birth name: Patrick R. Dubar
- Also known as: Adawee, The Wind
- Origin: United States
- Genres: Punk rock, hardcore punk

Patrick R. "Adawee" Dubar is an American singer, primarily with hardcore bands such as Unity and Uniform Choice, initially in the straight edge subgenre. Together with Pat Longrie (Uniform Choice), they ran the hardcore label Wishingwell Records.

He later went on to bands like Mind Funk, Corporate Avenger and Sitting Bull.

Dubar is a graduate of Pepperdine University.

He is the older brother of Courtney Dubar, founder of Affliction Clothing.

== Discography ==
=== with Unity ===
- You Are One... (1985)
- Blood Days (1989)

=== with Uniform Choice ===
- Uniform Choice (1984)
  - reissued in 1990
- Screaming for Change (1986)
- Region of Ice (1988)
- Staring into the Sun (1988)

=== with Mind Funk ===
- Mind Funk (1991)
- Dropped (1993)
- People Who Fell from the Sky (1995)

=== with Corporate Avenger ===
- The New Testament (2000)
- Freedom Is A State Of Mind (2001)
- Born Again (2005)
- People over Profit (2025)
