= Project .44 =

- Origin: Chicago, Illinois, United States
- Genres: Industrial rock
- Years active: 1998 - present
- Labels: Invisible Records, Give/Take, WuLi/INGrooves, Phage Tapes
- Members: Chri5 Harri5; Louis Svitek; Michael J. Carrasquillo
- Past members: Eric McWhorter; Navy Pierre; Anand Bhatt; Conor Goetz; Jeremy Dyson; WORMIKE; Kenny Symptom; Whiskeydave Fly; B-Mitch; Jonathan Ian; Bill Demarco; Max Goode; Charles Levi; MeTaL
- Website: Official Project .44 Site

Project .44 is an industrial rock band from Chicago, Illinois with members included in the group from both Ministry and My Life With The Thrill Kill Kult. The band has released three albums to date. Their first album, Look Me in the Eye, came out in 1999 and their second album, The System Doesn't Work, came out in 2005. Two music videos have been filmed for the tracks "Warpath" and "I", both of which are from their second album. The band is currently signed to Invisible Records, which is also based in Chicago and is the current home of fellow Industrial icons Pigface.

In May 2020, the Los Angeles/Minneapolis-based record label Give/Take released a 15th Anniversary remastered edition of project .44's Invisible Records debut, The System Doesn't Work on translucent red vinyl (a deluxe edition featured the remix album The System Reworked). Later, in December 2020, the label followed up with a remastered version of project .44's debut Look Me In The Eye on CD.

In December 2021 the band released their 3rd record (the storm before) reform on WuLi/INGrooves (digital and CD) and on vinyl and cassette with Phage Tapes. A music video for the song Murder Weapon was released in March 2022.
