= Lucy Brown (band) =

American funk rock/metal band

- Origin: Washington, D.C., United States
- Genres: Funk rock, funk metal
- Years active: 1987–1994
- Labels: T.O.G., Megaforce/Atlantic, Death Rebel
- Past members: Scott Llewellyn; Luis Peraza Jr. Chris Neuberg; Gene Hawkins; Jon Papazoglou
- Website: http://atomicmusic.com

Lucy Brown was a 1990s Washington D.C. area funk rock/metal band.

== History ==
The band was originally formed in 1987, with lead singer/bassist Scott Llewellyn, guitarist Luis Peraza Jr., and drummer Chris Neuberg. Lucy Brown recorded an eponymous LP for DC-area label T.O.G. Records in 1988. The vinyl-only release suffered from low sales and limited distribution, and was not a success beyond the DC area.

After adding a new lead singer, Gene Hawkins (Llewellyn stayed on as bassist), Lucy Brown signed with Megaforce Records, for which they recorded another self-titled LP in 1991. The album was not a commercial success, and the band lost their contract with Megaforce.

Llewellyn left the band in 1992, and was replaced by Jon Papazoglou. Lucy Brown made one final recording, an EP entitled Five Dogs Dead for the local Death Rebel label. Gene Hawkins died in 1994 from an overdose of heroin, and the surviving members of the band decided to disband. Today, Luis Peraza Jr. and Eric Schwelling run Atomic Music, a company with two musical instrument stores in the DC metropolitan area.

== Discography ==
- 1988: Lucy Brown (T.O.G.)
- 1991: "Search & Annoy Volume 1" f/ Lucy Brown 'Color-Blind' (LIVE)
- 1991: Lucy Brown (Megaforce/Atlantic)
- 1993: Five Dogs Dead (Death Rebel)
