= Skatenigs =

American industrial rock band

- Origin: Austin, Texas, U.S.
- Genres: Punk rock, industrial rock, industrial hip hop
- Years active: 1989–1995; 2016–present
- Labels: Megaforce; Red Light; Wax Trax
- Members: Phil Owen, Chris Ahrens, Myke Bingham
- Past members: See band members section
- Website: skatenigs.com

Skatenigs is an American industrial rock band from Austin, Texas, known for their fusion of punk, metal, and electronic influences. The band gained recognition in the early 1990s with their aggressive sound, politically charged lyrics, and wild stage performances.

== History ==
In brief and notable: The Skatenigs' lead singer, Phil "Phildo" Owen, previously performed on the album Beers, Steers, and Queers by the Revolting Cocks and performed with the band on tour from 1989 to 1991. They released the single "Chemical Imbalance" in 1991 on Wax Trax! Records. Its B-side was a cover of the Big Boys song "Big Picture." Their debut album, Stupid People Shouldn't Breed, was released on Megaforce Records in 1992. It was produced by Ministry frontman Al Jourgensen, making the Skatenigs the first Texas band to attract Ministry's attention. Also in 1992, Owen produced Burning in Water, Drowning in Flame, the debut album by fellow Texans from Corpus Christi Skrew. Owen formed Choreboy along with Chris Gates of the Big Boys.

=== Formation and Early Years (1989–1991) ===
Skatenigs was founded in 1989 by Phil Owen, who had previously collaborated with Al Jourgensen of Ministry. The band's early sound was heavily influenced by the industrial and crossover thrash movements, blending elements of punk, metal, hip-hop, and electronic sampling.

Initially, Skatenigs gained underground attention through their affiliation with Revolting Cocks, a side project of Jourgensen. Their track “Chemical Imbalance” was featured on the Beers, Steers, and Queers album by Revolting Cocks, further exposing them to the industrial and alternative metal audience.

=== Breakthrough and Stupid People Shouldn’t Breed (1992–1995) ===
In 1992, Skatenigs signed with Wax Trax! Records and released their debut album, Stupid People Shouldn’t Breed. The record was well received in underground industrial and alternative metal circles, featuring aggressive guitar riffs, distorted vocals, and sarcastic, politically-charged lyrics. Notable tracks included:

- “Chemical Imbalance”
- “Horny for Evil”
- “Roadkill”

The band's high-energy performances, often featuring over-the-top theatrics and controversial themes, helped them gain a cult following. During this time, they also toured extensively with other industrial acts like Ministry, Revolting Cocks, and KMFDM, Gwar, Fear and many others.

Following the underground success of their debut album, Stupid People Shouldn’t Breed (1992), Skatenigs returned in 1994 with their second full-length release, What a Mangled Web We Leave. The album saw the band expanding their sound, incorporating heavier industrial-metal elements while maintaining their punk-influenced, politically irreverent style.

What a Mangled Web We Leave further cemented Skatenigs’ reputation for aggressive, satirical, and unapologetically rowdy music.

Notable tracks from the album included:

- “Hoosegow” – A high-energy track with chaotic sampling and thrash influences.
- “Passion for Destruction” – Showcasing the band’s signature fusion of punk, metal, and industrial beats.
- “Texas Tattoo” – A hard-hitting song with themes of rebellion and law enforcement confrontations.

Despite positive reception among underground fans, the album faced limited commercial success due to its abrasive nature and anti-establishment themes. However, it remains a cult favorite and an important entry in the industrial rock and crossover thrash genres.

=== In the middle ===
In 2006, Phil Owen revived Skatenigs with a new lineup. The band released a mix of new material and reissued older tracks, appealing to their original fanbase while gaining new listeners. They maintained an underground presence, occasionally performing at festivals and special events.

In 2016, Skatenigs released Adult Entertainment for Kids, marking their official return to recording. The album blended their classic industrial-punk sound with modern production techniques, featuring tracks like "Taste" and "Wake Up", "Car Crash" and "Stick it in".

=== Continued Activity and New Releases (2018–Present) ===
In 2018, Phil added seminal member, songwriting collaborator and production partner Chris Ahrens to the band's reboot. The two continue to be the most productive iteration of the band to this day.

In 2021, the band dropped the single "Hell and Back", marking their continued presence in the industrial crossover genre. The track blended their signature mix of heavy guitars, electronic beats, and politically charged lyrics.

The following year, in 2021, Skatenigs released the album What Could Go Wrong?, a raw and aggressive follow-up to their previous work. This album featured tracks such as:

- “Hell and Back” – a fan-favorite anthem with themes of resilience and chaos.
- “Erase Today” – a hard-hitting track blending thrash, punk, and electronic elements.
- “We can't have nice things” – showcasing the band's rebellious spirit and love for debauchery.

After the album’s release, Skatenigs continued to play select shows and festivals, keeping their cult following engaged.

In 2023, the band released a new album, Unintended Consequences, a collection of remixes from What could go Wrong, embracing even more absurdist and chaotic themes while maintaining their signature industrial-punk fusion. Later that year the band released "This is Entertainment", a long awaited collection of remixes of the classic single "Chemical Imbalance".

As of 2024, Skatenigs continue to write, record, and tour, staying true to their high-energy, politically irreverent roots. Despite shifting musical trends, they maintain a devoted underground following, proving their lasting impact on the industrial rock and crossover thrash scenes.

2025 will see Skatenigs revisiting where it all began, by a tour celebrating their debut release, Stupid People Shouldn't Breed.

=== Legacy ===
Skatenigs remain an influential name in the industrial rock and crossover thrash scenes, known for their irreverent attitude, politically charged lyrics, and genre-blending style. While never achieving mainstream success, they hold a dedicated cult following, particularly among fans of 1990s Wax Trax! artists.

== Members ==
=== Current ===
- Phildo Owen
- Chris Ahrens
- Sean Haezebrouck
- David SKAR Carpenter

=== Past ===
- Ron Brietzke - Bass (9 string)
- Christopher Chambers - Guitar/programming
- Jason "Megabyte" Cobb - Keyboards
- "Keefy Weefy" Dailey- Drums
- Mark Dufour - Drums/programming
- Mike Dunn - Drums
- Ralph Ekakiadis - Keyboards
- Chip Fischer - Drums
- Chris Gates - Bass
- Billy Jackson - Guitar
- Mat Mitchell - Guitar/programming
- Don G. "DonG" Meyer - Mascot
- Adam Lamar - Guitars, programming, and keys (Werefoot, The Silent Sounds)
- Jack Lightfoot - Bass
- Greg Main - Drums
- John Monte - Bass
- Wendy Nelson - Keyboards
- Phil "Phildo" Owen - Insults, vocals, production and advertising
- Lance Von Moulder - Bass
- Steve "Bunghole" Schubert - Guitar (unplugged)
- Clayton Wavering - Guitar
- Jason Wolford - Turntables/programming
- Myke Bingham - Drums/Bass
- Bradley Bills (CHANT, PIG, Die Krupps, My Life with the Thrill Kill Kult, KMFDM)

=== Guest appearances and cameos ===
- Al Jourgensen(Ministry, Pailhead, Lard)
- Jeff Ward
- Gibby Haynes (Butthole Surfers)
- Lee Ving (Fear)
- Greg Hetsen (Circle Jerks)
- Spit Stix (Fear)
- Riggs (Rob Zombie)
- Galen Walen (Lords of Acid)
- Dan Milligan (Joy Thieves)
- DJ Swamp (Beck, Ministry)
- Marstan Daly (My Life with the Thrill Kill Kult)
- Charles Levi (My Life with the Thrill Kill Kult)
- Paul Raven (Killing Joke, Prong)
- Mike Dean (Geto Boys, Scarface, Michael Jackson, Kanye West)
- Jason West (Wednesday 13)
- Chris Vrenna (Nine Inch Nails)
- Pablo Flores (Worm Suicide)
- Satan’s cheerleaders

Additional studio help roster:

- Jeff "Dawg" Allen
- King George
- Joe Kelly
- Leslie Stewart
- Rosemary Walker
- Jacy Planta
- Fluffy
- Jody and Jill
- Caroline Schwartz
- Steve Shaw
- Palmer Earley
- Wax Trax staff
- Trax studio staff
- Digital Services staff

== Discography ==
- Stupid People Shouldn't Breed (Megaforce, 1992)
- What a Mangled Web We Leave (Red Light Records, 1994)
- Adult Entertainment For Kids (Self-released, 2016)
- Self Medicated (Bandcamp, Soundcloud 2018)
- Show Me Where They Touched You (Medical Records, 2020)
- Show Me Where They Touched You... Again (Medical Records, 2020)
- What Could Go Wrong (Cleopatra Records 2021) (Armalyte Industries 2021)
- Unintended Consequences (Arrest Records 2023)
- Waspzilla (soundtrack)
- This is Entertainment (Arrest Records 2023)
