= Spies Who Surf =

American surf rock band

- L-R: Todd Colburn, Tommy Klein (seated), David Suycott, Marty Busca

Background information
- Origin: Chicago, Illinois
- Genres: Surf rock
- Years active: 1987-1997, 1999
- Past members: Tommy Klein, Todd Colburn, Marty Busca, David Suycott, Tim Mulvena, Marshall Dawson

Spies Who Surf were a surf rock band from Chicago. They were recognized by Billboard (magazine) as being part of a global surf rock movement. They have shared the stage with national surf acts, including the Ventures and Dick Dale.

== Background ==
They debuted on Thanksgiving 1987 and disbanded in 1997, though they did reform for one show in 1999.

In the Illinois Entertainer's first Chicago Musician Awards, held July 16, 1990 at Cabaret Metro, David Suycott was voted "best drummer" and Todd Colburn was voted "best guitarist". Suycott also won the Avalon's Drum Solo Contest in 1990.

In 1993 David Suycott left the band to join the industrial rock band Stabbing Westward. Todd Colburn moved to New York where he formed his own surf band, called "This Spy Surfs", with B. Clay on bass and Max Tucker on percussion. Tommy Klein co-founded the jazz fusion ensemble Liquid Soul along with Psychedelic Furs sax player Mars Williams.

Tommy Klein and Marty Busca continued the Spies Who Surf with new drummer Tim Mulvena and new guitarist Marshall Dawson. This line-up continued until 1997 when they disbanded.

In 1999, Tommy Klein was drafted to play a gig with the Greaseballs, another Chicago surf band, substituting for their guitarist Manny Guevara who could not play the show. When the Greaseballs played a few Spies Who Surf tunes, the reaction from the crowd prompted Klein to talk to Busca, who attended the show, about reforming the band. The band did reform briefly, with Suycott returning on drums, but the reunion was short-lived due to Busca's continuing problem with drug abuse. Busca died of a heroin overdose on January 5, 2002. The Spies played one more show on January 20, 2002, as a memorial to Busca, at the Beat Kitchen in Chicago with Dan Polonsky substituting on bass.

In 2010, Tommy Klein and Marshall Dawson started a new surf rock band called "Ambassadors to Earth", along with Dan Polonsky on bass, and Larry Brown on drums.

== Band members ==
=== Spies Who Surf ===
- Tommy Klein — guitar (1987-1997, 1999)
- Marty Busca — bass (1987-1997, 1999) (Died: Jan 2002)
- Todd Colburn — guitar (1987-1993)
- Marshall Dawson — guitar (1993-1997, 1999)
- David Suycott — drums (1987-1993, 1999)
- Tim Mulvena — drums (1993-1997)

=== Ambassadors to Earth ===
- Tommy Klein — guitar (2010–present)
- Marshall Dawson — guitar (2010–present)
- Dan Polonsky — bass (2010–present)
- Larry Brown — drums (2010–present)

== Discography ==
=== Albums ===
Calling All Martians

- Released: 1993
- Format: CD
- Label: Monsterdisc
- Tracks: "Intro: Walk of the Zombie", "Spy Beach", "Cyanide Junkie", "Ecology Trilogy: Suicide Spree / Destroy All Pollution / Evacuation", "Boss X Blowout", "Stakeout", "Calling All Martians", "Xenophobia", "Keys to Her Ferrari", "The Creep", "Black Earth", "Surf Nazi Clambake", "Necrophiliac"

=== Compilation appearances ===
- "Stake Out" on It Came From Jay's Garage (1988, Moving Target Records)
- "Hocus Pocus" on 20 Explosive Dynamic Super Smash Hit Explosions! (1991, Pravda Records)
- "Spy Beach" on Beyond the Beach (1994, Upstart Records)

== Reception ==
- "As a Chicago fixture for almost a decade, the Spies were one of those bands who almost everyone had heard of, and were surprised they weren't more famous. With their instrumental rock that called upon elements from surf, jazz and film themes, Spies gigs were regular and consistently packed to the gills." (Kevin M. Williams, Chicago Suntimes)
- "The Spies may surf, but they don't sing. Performing a brand of psycho-groove instrumental music similar to what the Ventures might have sounded like if they'd been hit on the head a few times" (The Mix, Chicago Suntimes)
- "Their blend of surf music and spaghetti Western or spy film soundtracks is irresistible not only for its style, but the fact that the Spies can flat out play." (Kevin M. Williams, Chicago Suntimes)
- "Dark and ominous sounds crawling out of the corner ready to pounce at a second's notice. This 1993 release by Chicago based Spies Who Surf is a classic mix of jazz and surf. Very good musicianship and writing, well produced tracks and interesting ideas. Some infectious material, some acquired taste, but all very well done." (Fat City Cigar Lounge)
- "Spies Who Surf perform rock themes from the golden age when guitar bands — The Ventures, Dick Dale, Link Wray, Duanne Eddie — were played on the radio." (Showcase, Chicago Reader)
