= M.O.D. =

American thrash metal band

Background information
- Also known as: Method of Destruction
- Origin: New York City, United States
- Genre: Crossover thrash
- Years active: 1986–1997, 2001–present
- Labels: Megaforce; Nuclear Blast; Index; I Scream
- Spinoff of: Stormtroopers of Death
- Members: Billy Milano; Scott Sargeant; Rob Moshetti; Michael Arellano
- Past members: See below
- Website: milanomosh.com

M.O.D. (abbreviation for Method of Destruction) is an American crossover thrash band from New York City, fronted by Stormtroopers of Death vocalist Billy Milano. The band has been around for 40 years minus one hiatus from 1997 to 2001, and released eight studio albums. With M.O.D., Milano sought to continue the style of Anthrax, Stormtroopers of Death (S.O.D.) and Nuclear Assault, mixing hardcore punk with thrash metal and humorous, politically incorrect lyrics.

== History ==
=== First four albums (1986–1993) ===
U.S.A. for M.O.D., the band's debut album, was released in 1987, produced by S.O.D. bandmate and Anthrax guitarist Scott Ian.

M.O.D.'s second album, Surfin' M.O.D. (1988), featured little thrash metal, focusing on humorous cover songs and a beach party atmosphere. The band returned to their roots on Gross Misconduct (1989), and expanded their sound on Rhythm of Fear (1992). Around that time, Milano reunited with S.O.D. at The Ritz in New York City.

Aside from supporting bands like Anthrax, Megadeth, Exodus, Overkill, Testament, Suicidal Tendencies, Pantera, Lȧȧz Rockit and Pro-Pain, and their music videos getting airplay by Headbangers Ball on MTV, M.O.D. never earned a mainstream audience, and temporarily disbanded between Gross Misconduct and Rhythm of Fear. This was the first of many break-ups or hiatuses.

=== Devolution, Dictated Aggression, and hiatus (1994–1999) ===
The following releases, Devolution (1994) and Dictated Aggression (1996), were poorly distributed and went out of print, despite a heavier style and more serious lyrics. Blackout Records reissued the albums in 2004.

Following M.O.D.'s split in 1997, Milano reformed S.O.D. and released Bigger than the Devil in 1999.

=== Reunions (2001–present) ===
In 2001, Milano reformed M.O.D. with a new lineup. Two years later, they released The Rebel You Love to Hate, a return to comedy metal that poked fun at white suburban rap fans and the war on terrorism. M.O.D. relocated to Austin, Texas, and released the album Red, White & Screwed in October 2007 through Index Entertainment, and launched a supporting tour in summer 2008. The band played its final touring show in the United States on September 13, 2008. The band still performs periodically, mostly in Austin, Texas, where Milano resides.

In May 2013, Milano announced the 25th-anniversary "Mexicans on Duty Tour", featuring the band's new lineup.

As early as 2014, M.O.D. began working on their eighth studio album, Busted, Broke & American. Later that year, they offered a free download of their first song in seven years, "Hermano". In May 2015, the group disbanded due to Milano focusing on his private life. All tours and album plans were cancelled. A month later, Milano announced that M.O.D. was still together and planning to finish work on Busted, Broke & American, followed by a tour to support it. On January 5, 2017, Milano announced that the recording of Busted, Broke & American was finished, and it would be M.O.D.'s final album. The album was released on July 7, 2017, and was M.O.D.'s first release on Megaforce Records since the 1995 compilation album Loved by Thousands, Hated by Millions. The album was called the "Chinese Democracy of crossover thrash" due to its delays.

When asked in a March 2018 interview if Busted, Broke & American was their final album or there would be a follow-up album, then-bassist Jason French said, "I believe there will be another album. In talking to Billy, he has some things in the works he wants to accomplish and I want to be part of those things as well. If things work out the way we would like them to, I think people are going to be blown away about what's in store for the future."

== Members ==
Current

- Billy Milano – vocals
- Rob Moschetti – bass
- Michael Arrellano – drums
- Louis Svitek – guitar

Former

- Tim McMurtrie - guitar
- Scott Sargeant – guitar/bass
- Louis Svitek – guitar
- Jason French - guitar
- Sean Kilkenny – guitar
- Tommy Klimchuck – guitar
- John Pereksta – guitar, bass
- Joe Young – guitar
- Joe Affe – guitar
- Bernard Langendorf – guitar
- Mark "Gruya" Grujin - guitar
- Damian "Milik" Milikić - guitar, bass
- David "Ova" Cerka - flute
- Ken Ballone – bass
- Jeff Wood – bass
- Jake Landrau – bass
- John Monte – bass
- Chris "Dawson Clawson" Dawson – bass, vocals
- Tim Casterline – bass
- David "Ziggy" Reinhardt – drums
- Keith Davis – drums
- Tim Mallare – drums
- Dave Chavarri – drums
- Tony Scaglione – drums
- Darren Verpeut – drums
- Danny "DNA" Burkhardt – drums
- Derek "Lennon" Lopez – drums

== Discography ==
Year	Title	Label	Chart peak
1987	U.S.A. for M.O.D.	Megaforce Records	153
1988	Surfin' M.O.D. (EP)	Megaforce Records	186
1989	Gross Misconduct	Megaforce Records	151
1992	Rhythm of Fear	Megaforce Records	—
1994	Devolution	Music for Nations	—
1995	Loved by Thousands, Hated by Millions (compilation)	Megaforce Records	—
1996	Dictated Aggression	Music for Nations	—
2003	The Rebel You Love to Hate	Nuclear Blast Records	—
2007	Red, White & Screwed	Index Entertainment	—
2017	Busted, Broke & American	Megaforce Records	—
