= U.S.A. for M.O.D. =

Studio album by M.O.D.
- Released: June 1987
- Studios: Pyramid, Ithaca, New York, USA
- Genre: Crossover thrash
- Length: 39:14; 42:02 with bonus
- Label: Megaforce
- Producers: Alex Perialas; Scott Ian

M.O.D. chronology
U.S.A. for M.O.D. (1987)	Surfin' M.O.D. (1988)

Professional ratings
Review scores
Source	Rating
AllMusic	4/5 stars

U.S.A. for M.O.D. is the debut studio album by American crossover thrash band M.O.D. It was released in 1987 on Megaforce Records. In 1988, the band subsequently released the EP, Surfin' M.O.D..

== Album name ==
While Stormtroopers of Death were recording their debut album, Speak English or Die, tentative plans were made for a follow-up titled U.S.A. for S.O.D., but when the band did not release an immediate follow-up, M.O.D. used the title instead.

== Track listing ==
All songs written by M.O.D., unless otherwise stated

No.	Title	Writer(s)	Length
1.	"Aren't You Hungry?"	Charlie Benante, Scott Ian, Danny Lilker, Billy Milano	3:25
2.	"Get a Real Job"		2:10
3.	"I Executioner"		2:31
4.	"Don't Feed the Bears"		1:03
5.	"Ballad of Dio"		0:11
6.	"Thrash or Be Thrashed"		0:51
7.	"Let Me Out"		1:39
8.	"Bubble Butt"	Benante, Ian, Lilker, Milano	0:43
9.	"You're Beat"		2:15
10.	"Bushwackateas"	Benante, Ian, Lilker, Milano	0:19
11.	"Man of Your Dreams"		3:40
12.	"That Noise"		0:13
13.	"Dead Men/Most/Captain Crunch"		3:30
14.	"Jim Gordon"	Benante, Ian, Lilker, Milano	2:39
15.	"Imported Society"		1:46
16.	"Spandex Enormity"		5:27
17.	"Short But Sweet"		0:06
18.	"Parents"		1:39
19.	"Confusion/You're X'ed" (CD bonus track)	The Faith	2:48
20.	"A.I.D.S."		2:00
21.	"Ruptured Nuptuals"		0:13
22.	"Ode to Harry"		1:31
23.	"Hate Tank"		2:20

== Credits ==
M.O.D.

- Billy Milano – vocals
- Tim McMurtrie – guitar
- Ken Ballone – bass
- Keith Davis – drums

Others

- Scott Ian – acoustic guitar, backing vocals
- Recorded at Pyramid Sound, Ithaca, New York, USA
- Produced by Alex Perialas and Scott Ian
- Engineered by Alex Perialas
- Executive produced by Jon Zazula
- Cover art by Anthony Ferrara
