= Devolution (album) =

Studio album by M.O.D.
- Released: 1994
- Recorded: Pyramid Sound, Ithaca, New York, USA
- Genre: Crossover thrash
- Length: 40:45
- Label: Music For Nations; Blackout Records re-issue
- Producer: Rob Hunter; Billy Milano

M.O.D. chronology
Rhythm of Fear (1992)	Devolution (1994)	Loved by Thousands (1995)

Alternative cover
- Blackout Records re-issue cover

Professional ratings
Review scores
Source	Rating
Allmusic	2/5 stars

Devolution is the fourth full-length studio album from American crossover thrash band, M.O.D. It was released in 1994 on Music For Nations and follows 1992's Rhythm of Fear.

Following the tradition of ever-changing line-ups, this album saw Milano swapping bass for guitar as well as vocal duties, with Dave Chavarri on drums being the only other member to appear on two consecutive albums. Tommy Klimchuck and Rob Moschetti took up the guitar and bass roles respectively.

In 2004, Blackout Records re-issued the album with a different cover and enhanced CD content of a concert in France in 1993.

== Track listing ==
All lyrics are written by Billy Milano; all music is composed by Billy Milano and Rob Moschetti.

No.	Title	Length
1.	"Land of the Free"	4:18
2.	"Devolution"	3:16
3.	"Repent"	3:44
4.	"The Angry Man"	4:14
5.	"Resist"	4:56
6.	"Crash n' Burn"	2:31
7.	"Super Touch"	3:48
8.	"Rock Tonite"	3:27
9.	"Behind"	2:58
10.	"Running"	3:25
11.	"Time Bomb"	5:49
12.	"Unhuman Race"	3:15

== Enhanced CD content ==
- Live at Club Bikini, Toulouse, France – September 14, 1993 – 31:03

== Credits ==
- Billy Milano – vocals, guitar
- Tommy Klimchuck – guitar
- Rob Moschetti – bass
- Dave Chavarri – drums
- Recorded and mixed at Pyramid Sound, Ithaca, New York, USA
- Produced and mixed by Rob Hunter and Billy Milano
- Mastered by Alex Perialas
- Original cover art by Anthony Ferrara
- Re-issue cover art by Rick Rios
