= Sheep on Drugs =

British music group

- Origin: London, England
- Genres: Techno; industrial
- Years active: 1990–present
- Labels: Island; Smash; Drug Squad; Invisible / Underground, Inc.
- Members: Lee Fraser
- Past members: Duncan X; Skot Diablo; Johnny Borden
- Website: www.sheepondrugs.co.uk

Sheep on Drugs are a British techno/industrial music group, originally formed by Duncan X (also known as King Duncan) on vocals and Lee Fraser (also known as Dead Lee) on guitar and keyboards.

== Biography ==
Duncan and Fraser met in 1988 and created Sheep on Drugs as a reaction to the direction of the late 1980s acid house scene. Fraser had previous musical experience and had experimented with sampling before meeting Duncan. Together, they aimed to create energetic electronic music. Los Angeles Times critic Steve Hochman drew comparisons to OMD and Soft Cell.

Initially associated with the rave movement, Sheep on Drugs released early singles such as "Catch 22", "Motorbike", "15 Minutes of Fame", and "Track X" (covered by Grace Jones as "Sex Drive"). "15 Minutes of Fame" charted in the UK, while "From A to H and Back Again" peaked at #4 on the CMJ RPM Charts and #40 in the UK.

Their 1993 debut album, Greatest Hits, produced by Gareth Jones, received positive reviews and charted at #55 in the UK. The follow-up album, ...On Drugs (1994), was less successful, attributed by Fraser to a lack of guidance and producer input.

After being dropped by Island, the band released two EPs: Suck in 1994 and Strapped for Cash in 1995 on the band's own label, The Drug Squad. The band was then signed to Martin Atkins' Invisible Records in the United States. With Invisible, they released the two EPs as Double Trouble in 1996, their third studio album, One for the Money and a remix collection, Never Mind the Methadone in 1997, and a live recording, Two for the Show in 1998.

By this time, they had tired of their situation in the States and were unsatisfied with Invisible. Frontman Duncan X departed Sheep on Drugs shortly afterwards though he did perform live with the band on rare occasions. Fraser continued his relationship with Invisible Records, releasing two more albums as "Bagman", and was briefly a member of Atkins' bands Pigface and The Damage Manual, usually under the moniker "Lee 303". Fraser revived the group in 2002, with himself as the frontman and collaborating with Johnny Borden. They released a new album, F**K, on Invisible in 2005.

Medication Time (2010), Club Meds (2012), and Does Dark Matter (2019) followed, with remixes and live performances continuing through the 2010s and 2020s.

Johnny Borden died in her sleep on 26 September 2026 of heart failure. ( Citation Needed )

== Discography ==
=== Studio albums ===
- Greatest Hits (1993)
- ...On Drugs (1994)
- Double Trouble (1996)
- One for the Money (1997)
- F**K (2005)
- Medication Time (2010)
- Club Meds (2012)
- Does Dark Matter (2019)
- The New Messiah (2024)
- Mad, Bad & Dangerous to Know (2025)

=== Live albums ===
- Two for the Show (1998)
- The Atomic Cafe 1996 (2006)
- Go Bang Festival 1992 Live (2023)

=== Remix albums ===
- Never Mind the Methadone (1997)
- Best of a Bad Bunch (2006)

=== EPs ===
- From A to H and Back Again (1994)
- Strapped for Cash (1995)
- Suck (1995)
- 2 Light 2 Dark (2019)
- Requiem for the Undead (2025)

=== Singles ===
- "Catch 22" / "Drug Music" (1991)
- "Motorbike" / "Mary Jane" (1992)
- "Track X" (1992)
- "TV USA" (1992)
- "15 Minutes of Fame" (1993)
- "Let the Good Times Roll" (1994)
- "Moonlight Man" (2020)

=== As Bagman (Lee Fraser solo) ===
- Wrap (1998)
- Trax (2004)

=== Tribute appearances ===
- "Back in Black" on Covered in Black (1997)
- "California über alles" on Dread Kennedys (1999)
- "Wish" on Covered in Nails (2000)
- "Money" on Don't Blow Your Cover (2000)

=== Soundtracks ===
- The Young Americans (1993) – 3 tracks
- Prey (2006) – "Machine Sex"
