= Dragpipe =

American metal band

- Origin: Union City, New Jersey, U.S.
- Genres: Alternative metal; stoner rock; nu metal
- Years active: 2001–2003
- Label: Interscope Records
- Past members: Jai Diablo; Richie Garcia; Gino DePinto; John Monte; Jeno; Pete Barrera

Dragpipe was an American alternative metal band from Union City, New Jersey. The band was known for their energetic live performances and developed a local following in North Jersey and across the Hudson River in New York City. In 2001, the band was signed to Interscope Records after successfully demoing their songs for Twiggy Ramirez and Jason Newsted. That same year, alongside other New York City area bands such as Biohazard and Glassjaw, as well as Sacramento band Will Haven, Dragpipe submitted contributions to Driven State – A Quicksand Tribute, a proposed tribute album for the influential New York post-hardcore band Quicksand.

In August 2002, Dragpipe released their debut (and only) album, Music for the Last Day of Your Life, produced by Dave Sardy (Helmet, Rage Against the Machine, Nine Inch Nails). Following the album's debut, the band produced and released a music video featuring adult actress Kitana Baker for their song "Simple Minded." That same year, the band embarked on an East Coast tour and a European tour with Filter. The album sold poorly (30,000 copies as of 2009) and the band was released from their record contract soon after the debut release, and they apparently disbanded.

== Members ==
- Jai Diablo (real name Jason Messina) – vocals
- Richie Garcia – guitar
- Gino DePinto – guitar
- John Monte – guitar
- Jeno (real name Michael Genovezos) – bass
- Pete Barrera – drums

== Studio albums ==
Year	Album details	
2002	Music for the Last Day of Your Life: Released: August 27, 2002; Label: Interscope; Format: CD	—
