= Corporate Avenger =

American rap rock band

Background information
- Origin: Huntington Beach, California, U.S.
- Genres: Nu metal, rap rock, industrial hip hop
- Years active: 1998–2005, 2024-present
- Labels: Massive Sound, Suburban Noize Koch Records
- Members: The Corporate Avenger (Spike Xavier); Adawee The Wind (Patrick Dubar)
- Past members: The Taxman; Patrick "Pakelika"

Corporate Avenger is an American Rap Rock/Nu Metal band from Southern California, known for blending aggressive rap-rock, industrial, and hardcore elements with provocative, politically charged lyrics. They originally emerged in the late 1990s, disbanded in the mid-2000s and reformed in 2024. Their music frequently addresses themes such as social injustice, corruption, religious critique, and historical wrongs, often delivered with confrontational intensity.

== History ==
The idea for the band Corporate Avenger was born some time between 1995 and 1996 when brothers, Spike and Brad Xavier were on tour in the band Humble Gods. Years later, Spike met with Marco of 1605 Studio in Huntington Beach, California, and recorded some songs. In 1999, these songs were released on Suburban Noize Records as the Taxes are Stealing EP. This EP featured the first song ever recorded by the group, "Evolve", a song questioning the origins of the native peoples of the Americas and Darwinism.

At the time of the EP, the band consisted of eight members, including Pakelika of the Kottonmouth Kings, and members of 20 Dead Flower Children and No Doubt. During this phase of the band's history, the group had an ever-changing lineup and no two shows would be alike.

In 2000, the group released a CD titled The New Testament, which featured new songs as well as three songs from the previous EP. It also featured a new lineup including the first appearance of vocalist Adawee the Wind.

2005 saw the release of the Born Again CD and also saw the departure of the Taxman.

In 2024, Corporate Avenger reunited and released a new song titled "War Is Won." Later that year several more songs were released, even leading into a new seven song collection, released on April 4, 2025.

== Discography ==
- Taxes Are Stealing EP (2000)
- The New Testament (2000)
- Freedom Is a State of Mind (2001)
- Born Again (2005)
- People Over Profit (2025)
