= Uniform Choice =

American hardcore punk band

- Also known as: Moral Sin (1982)
- Origin: Orange County, California, U.S.
- Genres: Hardcore punk
- Years active: 1982–1990; 1991–1994
- Labels: Wishingwell, Giant, Lost and Found, Nemesis, Dr. Strange
- Past members: Pat Dubar; Victor Maynez; Pat Dyson; David Mellow; John Lorey; Patrick Longrie; Jim Viviano; Mike Hanes; Rich J. Weinrauch; Trent Ober; Myke Bates; Hanson Meyer; Dave Marriott; Eric Hanna; Elliott Colla; Eric von Arab; Brent Turner

Uniform Choice (formerly known as Moral Sin) was an American hardcore punk band from Orange County, California.

== History ==
Uniform Choice was started by guitarist Myke Bates, bassist Hanson Meyer and drummer Eric Hanna during the spring of 1982 in Newport Beach, California. Bates had been playing with a couple of bands previously in Palm Springs and his band, Funeral Information, had played early punk shows with SIN 34 and Black Flag. He is also credited for writing the song "Rodney On The ROQ" for KROQ-FM DJ Rodney Bingenheimer, which was performed by Target 13 and appeared on the compilation album Rodney on the ROQ, Vol 2 under the independent record label Posh Boy Records.

Bates left his skateboard shop, Bates Skates, behind in Palm Springs and moved to Newport Beach. He looked to start a new band in Orange County and found Meyer and Hanna who were playing with guitarist Dave Marriott (Hollywood Hate, The Lowdowns, The NightCrawlers) and singer Scott Brandon in a local punk band called Moral Sin. Bates had originally joined the lineup of Moral Sin as a second guitarist but soon after, Scott Brandon left the group leaving it without a singer. Bates then moved into the dual role of guitarist/singer and suggested the group change its name to Uniform Choice with the explanation that it represented our right to do whatever we wanted to do.

After about two months, Marriott left the group to pursue other endeavors and the remaining members pressed forward as a power trio. Meyer and Bates wrote a number of songs together over the course of the next two years including "War is Here" and "Don't Take the Car You'll Kill Yourself". After the punk club Cuckoo's Nest closed down, there were limited clubs for the band to play in the Orange County area. Not too long after the closure of the Cuckoo's Nest, the club reopened as "The Concert Factory" and it was there that Uniform Choice played most of their early shows in late 1982. Bates played guitar and sang lead vocals in the beginning until the group landed on lead singer Elliott Colla, a former classmate of Meyer and Hanna's from Corona Del Mar High School. The band experimented with other singers before Colla. Newport Beach local Eric Whittick sang for a short while. And later in the tradition of X-Ray Spex, 14-year-old Jennifer Harper fronted the band for a short time along with second guitar player Eric VonArab (Love Canal).

The band made its first studio demo in September 1982 (Orange Peel Sessions) with Colla heading up vocals. The recordings were engineered and produced by Tom Springston (Tom Tom) of Burnt Party Host and were recorded in Corona Del Mar, California. In 1983, the band experimented with an additional second lead bass player, Brent Turner. Turner only played several shows with the band and left the group to record the album When in Rome Do as the Vandals with The Vandals. Over the course of the first two years the group performed with other established punk acts such as Black Flag, SIN 34, Circle Jerks, Channel 3, Shattered Faith, Bad Religion, Circle One and Angry Samoans.

In early 1983, Hanna and Meyer decided to leave the band, and Bates enlisted an entire new lineup which would be fronted by Pat Dubar and drums being played by Hanna's friend and classmate Pat Dyson (who had played with Plain Wrap in 1983), and Bass being played by John Lorey, and Guitar by Vic Maynez. Meyer went on to play with other groups such as the Finks and Peace Corp., while Bates left the group later in 1983 to pursue other endeavors in Hollywood, California. Dyson and Dubar tried to re-recruit Eric VonArab to rejoin this new rendition of the band.

The group with this final lineup of Pat Dubar, Pat Dyson, Vic Maynez and David Mello went forward with a new vision as Uniform Choice and continued to record and create what was considered the first O.C. Straight Edge Demos. The group gained momentum nationally while performing throughout California and beyond bringing the group to their current level of recognition in the Southern California punk subculture.

Screaming for Change is their most acclaimed album. They also recorded another less well received LP called Staring into the Sun and their demo has been bootlegged several times. Pat Dubar was a graduate of Pepperdine University and created the label Wishingwell Records, which released albums by Unity, Uniform Choice, Blast, and Youth of Today, among others. Uniform Choice is historically among the first five Straight Edge Hardcore bands to emerge from Southern California.

== Members ==
- Hanson Meyer – bass (1982–1983)
- Eric Hanna – drums (1982–1983)
- Scott Brandon – vocals (1982)
- Dave Marriott – guitar (1982)
- Myke Bates – guitar, vocals (1982–1983)
- Eric Whittick - vocals (1982)
- Jennifer Harper - vocals (1982)
- Eric VonArab – guitar (1982)
- Elliott Colla – vocals (1982–1983)
- Brent Turner – bass (1983)
- Pat Dubar – vocals (1983–1990)
- Victor Maynez – guitar (1983–1990)
- Pat Dyson – drums (1983–1986)
- John Lorey – bass (1983–1984)
- David Mellow – bass (1984–1990)
- Patrick Longrie – drums (1986–1990; 1991–1994)
- Jim Viviano – vocals (1991–1994)
- Mike Hanes – guitar (1991–1994)
- Rich J Weinrauch – guitar (1991–1994)
- Trent Ober – bass (1991–1994)

== Discography ==
- Orange Peel Sessions demo (recorded in 1982, released in 2015)
- Uniform Choice demo (1984)
- Screaming for Change (Wishingwell Records, 1986)
- Region of Ice Giant Records(1988)
- Staring Into the Sun Giant Records (1988)
- Getting the point across (live in SF 1988) Lost & Found Records LF247/CD (1996)
- Rainmaker demo (1991)
- Consider This demo (1992)
