= John Monte =

American musician

John Monte is an American musician, known for being the bassist for Evan Seinfeld's band, The Spyderz. He was a bassist for M.O.D., Mind Funk, Ministry, Human Waste Project and a guitarist for Dragpipe, Handful of Dust and Evil Mothers.
