= Louis Svitek =

American musician

Louis Svitek is an American musician and former guitarist for a number of bands including Zoetrope, M.O.D., Ministry, Pigface, Mind Funk, The Hollow steps, Project .44, and The Joy Thieves. His work can also be found in many movie soundtracks, such as The Matrix and Blue Hill Avenue.

== WuLi Records ==
Louis Svitek and partner Ryan McGuire founded their own recording studio and independent record label, "WuLi Records", in Chicago, IL. WuLi Records was responsible for discovering Chicago acts The Redd, Young Inno, The Waking, and American Idol 2010 winner Lee DeWyze, among others. Prior to Idol, Louis Svitek was part of the Lee DeWyze Band that also included Ryan McGuire and Jeff Henderson.
