= Megaforce Records =

American record label

- Founded: 1982
- Founder: Jon Zazula; Marsha Zazula
- Distributors: Independent (1982–1985); Atlantic (1985–1991); Island (1985–1991); Discos CBS (1991–1992); Epic (1992–2000); RED (2000–2017); The Orchard (2017–present); Sony Music (1993–present)
- Genre: Heavy metal; thrash metal; hard rock; hardcore punk
- Country of origin: U.S.
- Location: New York City
- Official website: www.megaforcerecords.com

Megaforce Records is an American independent record label founded in 1982 by Jon Zazula and his wife Marsha Zazula to release the first works of Metallica, and devoted primarily to hard rock and heavy metal. It has offices in New York City (where the corporate office is located) and Philadelphia. The label currently is distributed in the United States by The Orchard and Sony Music internationally, having previously been distributed by Atlantic Records while Anthrax's recordings from 1985 to 1991 were marketed by Island Records.

Megaforce artists that have appeared on the Billboard Top 200 chart include Metallica, Blue October, Anthrax, Overkill, Testament, Mushroomhead, Ministry, Bad Brains and Meat Puppets. The Black Crowes and Meat Puppets have both received various RIAA certifications in the US.

Marsha Zazula, the co-founder of Megaforce Records, died of cancer on January 10, 2021, at the age of 68. Her husband Jon died a year later, on February 1, 2022, at the age of 69.

== Artists (current and former) ==
=== Heavy metal artists ===
- Anthrax
- Blessed Death
- Blue Cheer
- Brendon Small
- Frehley's Comet
- Eric Steel
- Exciter
- Fozzy
- Grave Digger
- Icon
- King's X
- Living Colour
- Lucy Brown
- Manowar
- Mercyful Fate
- Metallica
- Ministry
- M.O.D.
- Mushroomhead
- Overkill
- Prophet
- Raven
- Skatenigs
- Skid Row
- Stormtroopers of Death (S.O.D)
- Sweaty Nipples
- Testament
- Trust
- T.T. Quick
- Vio-lence

=== Other artists ===
- Ace Frehley
- Bad Brains
- Björk
- Blue October
- Das Racist
- Heems
- Disco Biscuits
- Hank Williams III
- Lostprophets
- Meat Puppets
- Nudeswirl
- They Might Be Giants
- Third Eye Blind
- Tribe After Tribe
- Truth & Salvage Co.
- Warren Haynes
- Wellwater Conspiracy
- Johnny Winter
