= Front 242 discography =

- Studio albums: 8
- Extended plays: 9
- Live albums: 6
- Compilation albums: 1
- Singles: 11
- Video albums: 6
- Remix albums: 1

This is the discography page for the electronic industrial group Front 242.

== Albums ==
=== Studio albums ===
Title	Album details	Peak chart positions						
Title	Album details	BEL Fl.	BEL Wa.	GER	NLD	SWE	UK	US
Geography	Released: September 1982; Label: Himalaya	64	36	—	—	—	—	—
No Comment	Released: September 1984; Label: Wax Trax! Records	—	—	—	—	—	—	—
Official Version	Released: March 1987; Label: Wax Trax! Records	—	—	—	—	35	—	—
Front by Front	Released: November 1988; Label: Wax Trax! Records	—	—	—	37	40	—	—
Tyranny (For You)	Released: January 1991; Label: Epic	—	—	28	71	27	49	95
06:21:03:11 Up Evil	Released: May 1993; Label: Epic	—	—	68	90	36	44	166
05:22:09:12 Off	Released: November 1993; Label: Epic	—	—	64	80	35	46	—
Pulse	Released: May 2003; Label: Metropolis	—	—	94	—	—	—	— (Note: Pulse did not enter the Billboard 200, but it peaked at number 20 on the Billboard Dance/Electronic Albums chart.)
"—" denotes a recording that did not chart or was not released in that territory.

=== Live albums ===
Title	Album details	Peak chart positions		
Title	Album details	BEL Fl.	BEL Wa.	GER
Live Target	Released: 1992; Label: Guzzi	—	—	—
Live Code	Released: 1994; Label: Play It Again Sam	—	—	—
Re-Boot: Live '98	Released: 1998; Label: Metropolis	—	—	62
Moments...1	Released: 2008; Label: Alfa Matrix	81	88	—
Transmission SE91	Released: 2013; Label: Minimal Maximal	—	—	—
Black Out	Released: 2026; Label: Alfa Matrix	164	—	—
"—" denotes a recording that did not chart or was not released in that territory.

=== Remix albums ===
- 1995 - Mut@ge.Mix@ge

=== Compilation albums ===
- 1987 - Back Catalogue

== EPs ==
- 1983 - Endless Riddance
- 1983 - Two in One
- 1984 - Live in Chicago
- 1985 - Politics of Pressure
- 1986 - Interception
- 1991 - Mixed by Fear
- 1993 - Angels Versus Animals
- 1998 - Headhunter 2000
- 2003 - Still & Raw

== Singles ==
Title	Year	Peak chart positions					Album
Title	Year	GER	SWE	UK	US Alt.	US Dance	Album
"Principles"	1981	—	—	—	—	—	Geography
"U-Men"	1981	—	—	—	—	—	Geography
"No Shuffle"	1985	—	—	—	—	—	No Comment
"Quite Unusual"	1986	—	—	—	—	—	Official Version
"Masterhit"	1987	—	—	—	—	—	Official Version
"Headhunter"	1988	—	—	—	—	13	Front by Front
"Never Stop!"	1989	37	—	—	—	21	Front by Front
"Tragedy >For You<"	1990	49	—	—	18	11	Tyranny (For You)
"Rhythm of Time"	1991	—	—	—	—	11	Tyranny (For You)
"Gripped by Fear"	1991	—	—	—	—	—	Tyranny (For You)
"Religion"	1993	—	15	46	—	43	06:21:03:11 Up Evil
"Animal"	1993	—	—	—	—	—	05:22:09:12 Off
"—" denotes a recording that did not chart or was not released in that territory.

== Video albums ==
Year	Title	Label	Notes
1990	A Video >For You<	Red Rhino Europe	Tragedy >For You< 'Visual Support'
1992	Integration Eight X Ten	Red Rhino Europe	Assorted music videos and live clips
1993	Untitled	Sony Music Studios	3 music videos and 1 song
1993	Religion	Epic	
2005	Catch the Men	Alfa Matrix	Live at Lokerse Feesten, 4 August 2004
2010	Moments in Budapest	Alfa Matrix	Live in Budapest, 6 December 2008
