= Live Code =

Live album by Front 242
- Released: 1994
- Recorded: 25 October 1993
- Genre: Industrial, EBM
- Length: 60:39
- Label: Play It Again Sam
- Producer: Daniel Bressanutti; Patrick Codenys

Front 242 chronology
05:22:09:12 Off (1993)	Live Code (1994)	Mut@ge.Mix@ge (1995)

Professional ratings
Review scores
Source	Rating
Allmusic	3/5 stars

Live Code is a live album by the industrial band Front 242. It was released in 1994. The album is also known as Live Code 6007042 02528 in North America or Live Code 5413356 424225 in Europe, depending on the UPC-EAN. It would later contrast the band's 1998 experimental live album Re-Boot: Live '98.

== Production ==
The album was recorded live for VPRO Radio 3 on October 25, 1993, at MC Vredenburg, Utrecht, Netherlands. The live-recording was produced by Flip van der Enden and engineered by Herman Geerling. The album was mastered by Bob Ludwig.

== Reception ==
The album peaked at #68 on the CMJ Radio Top 200 in the U.S.

== Track listing ==
No.	Title	Credit	Length
1.	"Der verfluchte Engel"	Bressanutti / Codenys / Westwood / Kowalski / Dubs
2.	"Motion"	Bressanutti / Codenys / De Meyer / J-M Pauly / P Pauly
3.	"Masterhit"	Bressanutti / Codenys / De Meyer / Jonckheere
4.	"Flag"	Bressanutti / Codenys / De Meyer / J-M Pauly / P Pauly
5.	"Tragedy ►For You◄"	Bressanutti / Codenys / De Meyer / Jonckheere
6.	"Im Rhythmus bleiben"	Bressanutti / Codenys / De Meyer / Jonckheere
7.	"Skin"	Bressanutti / Codenys / De Meyer / J-M Pauly / P Pauly
8.	"Headhunter"	Bressanutti / Codenys / De Meyer / Jonckheere
9.	"Welcome to Paradise"	Bressanutti / Codenys / De Meyer / Jonckheere
10.	"Crapage"	Bressanutti / Codenys / De Meyer / J-M Pauly / P Pauly
11.	"Soul Manager"	Bressanutti / Codenys / De Meyer / Jonckheere
12.	"Punish Your Machine"	Bressanutti / Codenys / De Meyer / Jonckheere
13.	"Religion"	Bressanutti / Codenys / De Meyer / J-M Pauly / P Pauly

All tracks published by Les Editions Confidentielles.
