= Re-Boot: Live '98 =

Live album by Front 242
- Released: July 21, 1998
- Recorded: 1997, 1998
- Genre: EBM, industrial, big beat
- Length: 69:50
- Label: Metropolis

Front 242 chronology
Mut@ge.Mix@ge (1995)	Re-Boot: Live '98 (1998)	Pulse (2003)

Professional ratings
Review scores
Source	Rating
Allmusic	4/5 stars

Re-Boot: Live '98 (also called Re:Boot or [:RE: BOOT]) is a live album from Front 242, released in 1998. This album stands in contrast to the band's previous live album Live Code, in that many of its tracks are radical reworkings of the band's earlier songs. Front 242 has identified The Prodigy as an influence on the style of this album. A similar style is also used on the Front 242 live performance DVD, Catch the Men. In the U.S., the album peaked at #71 on the CMJ Radio Top 200 while hitting #1 on the CMJ RPM chart.

== Track listing ==
No.	Title	Length
1.	"Happiness"
2.	"Masterhit"
3.	"Moldavia"
4.	"Melt"
5.	"Soul Manager"
6.	"No Shuffle"
7.	"In Rhythmus Bleiben"
8.	"Crapage"
9.	"Body To Body"
10.	"Religion"
11.	"Headhunter"
12.	"Welcome To Paradise"
13.	"First In First Out"
14.	"Punish Your Machine"
15.	"Motion" (bonus track)
