= Funkahdafi =

Belgian single about Gaddafi

"Funkahdafi" is a 1985 song by Belgian electronic band Front 242 about Libyan leader Muammar Gaddafi. The song is one of the band's concert favourites. "Funkahdafi" first appeared on the EP Politics of Pressure (1985) and was written by Daniel Bressanutti. It also appeared on the band's compilation album Back Catalogue (1987).

== Song ==
The song opens with a vocal sample of American religious leader and political activist Louis Farrakhan at a Non-Aligned Movement meeting: "We who are oppressed love those who fight against oppression and the oppressors. Brothers and sisters, it is with great honor and privilege that I present to you the leader of the al-Fatah revolution. From Libya, our brother Muammar al-Gaddafi."
