= Mut@ge.Mix@ge =

Remix album by Front 242
- Released: 1995
- Genre: Electronica, Goa trance
- Length: 72:38
- Label: Red Rhino
- Producer: Daniel Bressanutti, Patrick Codenys

Front 242 chronology
Live Code (1994)	Mut@ge.Mix@ge (1995)	Re-Boot: Live '98 (1998)

Mut@ge.Mix@ge is an album by Front 242, released in 1995, a collection of both previously released and new material, some remixed by notable Electronica bands of the genre.

== Critical reception ==
Professional ratings
Review scores
Source	Rating
CMJ	positive
Vox	8/10 stars

Vox magazine gave Mut@ge.Mix@ge a positive review, referring to the release as a "sabbatical stopgap' that "[errs] on the side of quiet ambience while managing to convey the menace of the Front's campaign." CMJ observes that "new school meets old school and the groove wins out" with this release and that "electronic music aficionados should find this album a tasty brew."

== Track listing ==
No.	Title	Length
1.	"Rhythm of Time" (Messengers of Neptune Mix by The Orb)
2.	"Happiness" (Dub Mix by Underworld)
3.	"Gripped by Fear" (Bunkerclub Mix by Rico Conning)
4.	"Mixed by Fear"
5.	"Crapage" (The Float or Sink Mix by The Orb)
6.	"Junkdrome"
7.	"Religion" (Bass Under Siege Mix by The Prodigy)
8.	"Happiness" (Dance Mix by Underworld)
9.	"Break Me" (female)
10.	"Rhythm of Time" (Victor the Cleaner Mix by The Orb)
11.	"Dancesoundtrackmusic" (d.s.m.)
12.	"Religion" (Trance U Down Mix by The Prodigy)

(Tracks 2, 5, 8 previously unreleased)

== Personnel ==
- Daniel Bressanutti
- Patrick Codenys
- Jean-Luc De Meyer
- Richard Jonckheere
