= Back Catalogue =

Compilation album by Front 242
- Released: 9 August 1987
- Recorded: 1982–1985
- Genre: EBM, industrial
- Length: 75:31
- Label: Wax Trax! Red Rhino Europe; Epic
- Producer: Front 242

Front 242 chronology
Official Version (1987)	Back Catalogue (1987)	Front by Front (1988)

Alternative cover
- 1992 Epic release cover

Back Catalogue is a compilation album by Front 242, released in 1987, and rereleased in 1992.

It is a collection of singles and other miscellaneous tracks, recorded from 1982 to 1985.

== Track listing ==
No.	Title	Length
1.	"U-Men"	3:13
2.	"Geography II"	1:08
3.	"Kampfbereit"	3:18
4.	"Operating Tracks"	3:48
5.	"Geography I"	2:16
6.	"Take One"	4:45
7.	"Controversy Between"	4:54
8.	"Sample D."	3:13
9.	"S.FR Nomenklatura I"	4:24
10.	"S.FR Nomenklatura II"	2:10
11.	"Lovely Day"	5:23
12.	"Special Forces"	5:30
13.	"Commando Remix"	9:03
14.	"No Shuffle"	3:45
15.	"Don't Crash"	4:51
16.	"Funkahdafi"	3:15
17.	"Take One" (Live)	5:00
18.	"U-Men" (Live)	5:00
Total length:		75:31
