= Headhunter (song) =

Single by Front 242

from the album Front by Front
- Released: 1988
- Genre: Industrial, EBM
- Length: 5:02
- Label: Red Rhino Europe; Wax Trax! Animalized
- Songwriters: Daniel Bressanutti; Patrick Codenys; Jean-Luc De Meyer; Richard-23

"Headhunter" is a 1988 song by the Belgian EBM band Front 242. The song was a major hit in the electronic and industrial music scenes, and Front By Front subsequently became the top selling album in the history of Wax Trax! Records.

== Release ==
"Headhunter" was released as a single in 1988, as a 12" (Version 1.0) and a 7" (Version 2.0). Each featured a corresponding version of "Welcome to Paradise" as the B-side. A third version appeared later on the 1988 album Front By Front (Version 3.0). A music video using the shorter "Version 2.0" soundtrack was directed by Anton Corbijn. It depicted the bandmembers in an urban landscape of Brussels, including the Berlaymont building and the Atomium that had been built for the 1958 World's Fair, and used eggs as a visual theme. According to bandmember Patrick Codenys this was because Corbijn misheard the song title as "Egg Hunter".

When asked during an interview about the concept for the song, Front 242's vocalist and lyricist Jean-Luc De Meyer replied, "I had the chance to work in an insurance company before, and I worked in the department of human resources and I saw the way that this company was trying to hire people. It was very polite and very nice with men in suits, but at the same time it was very cut-throat. I wanted to make a parallel between tribal warfare and these activities. The song means both of these activities."

After a long hiatus from 1993 onward, Front 242 regrouped to re-record the song in late 1999, releasing it with multiple remixes on the dual-CD single Headhunter 2000.

== Reception ==
COMA Music Magazine ranked "Headhunter" as the greatest industrial song of all time in 2012. In 2022, Rolling Stone ranked it at number 60 in its list of the "200 Greatest Dance Songs of All Time".

== Headhunter track listing (CD, 1988) ==
1. Headhunter (v1.0)
2. Welcome to Paradise (v1.0)
3. Headhunter (v2.0)

== Headhunter 2000 track listing (1999) ==
- Disc 1:
1. Headhunter (Front Line Assembly mix) - 5:55
2. Headhunter (Aqualite mix) - 5:20
3. Headhunter (Haujobb mix) - 5:29
4. Headhunter (Beefcake mix) - 5:09
5. Headhunter (Xingu mix) - 4:18
6. Headhunter (Talla 2XLC mix) - 8:54
7. Headhunter (Doug Laurent mix) - 6:31
8. Headhunter (Noisex mix) - 6:19
9. Headhunter (Substanz T mix) - 4:59
- Disc 2:
1. Headhunter (Apoptygma Berzerk mix) - 5:43
2. Headhunter (Leæther Strip mix) - 5:39
3. Headhunter (Funker Vogt mix) - 4:46
4. Headhunter (Empirion mix) - 7:14
5. Headhunter (Galan Pixs mix) - 6:33
6. Headhunter (Resistance D mix) - 6:41
7. Headhunter (Suspicious mix) - 8:29
8. Headhunter (Space Frog mix) - 6:50

The above tracks for Headhunter 2000 were split across four discs in another version of the release. Other versions of the release are listed here at FreeDB and at Discogs. Some of them include additional remixes:

1. Headhunter (Peak mix) - (3:36)
2. Headhunter (Children Within mix) - (4:09)
3. Headhunter (M.I.K.E. & B's Generator mix) - (7:43)
4. Headhunter (Talla 2XLC Vocal Club Mix) - (8:50) (by Talla 2XLC and Vernon B.)

== Other known covers and remixes ==
Hot Tracks and Razormaid! (also known as "Welcome to...Headhunter") released remixes of the song to DJs. In addition, Danny Tenaglia, Eskimos & Egypt, DBS, Project 12:01, Icon of Coil and Ayria made cover versions. Aghast View also did a remix, and ThouShaltNot produced a parody version in a relaxed jazz/lounge style (in contrast to the pounding industrial dance beat of the original). Funk carioca group Bonde do Tigrão sampled the instrumental of this song in "Cerol na Mão", released in 2001, resulting in a lawsuit by Front 242 against Bonde do Tigrão due to musical plagiarism.
