= Front by Front =

Studio album by Front 242
- Released: November 1988
- Genre: EBM, industrial
- Length: 36:28; 41:46 1988 CD issue 69:37 Epic CD issue
- Label: Red Rhino Europe; Wax Trax! Animalized; Epic
- Producer: Front 242

Front 242 chronology
Official Version (1987)	Front by Front (1988)	Tyranny (For You) (1991)

1992 Epic release cover

Singles from Front by Front
- 1. "Headhunter" Released: 1988

Front by Front is the fourth studio album by Front 242, released in 1988, and has been labelled as "easily one of the greatest industrial albums ever made". The album was reissued in 1992 by Sony Music Entertainment. The song "Headhunter" became an industrial dancefloor hit, accompanied by a music video directed by Anton Corbijn, and has since been subject to over 20 remixes.

Miss Kittin used "First In / First Out" on her mix album A Bugged Out Mix.

== Reception ==
Professional ratings
Review scores
Source	Rating
AllMusic	4.5/5 stars
Encyclopedia of Popular Music	3/5 stars
MusicHound	4/5
NME	9/10
Record Mirror	4/5
Select	5/5
The Village Voice	B−

Front by Front was one of Wax Trax! Records' most successful releases, selling more than 90,000 units in its first run. The album, and its lead single "Headhunter", elevated the public awareness of EBM and industrial music in the late 1980s.

In 2019, Pitchfork ranked it at number 6 in its list of the "33 Best Industrial Albums of All Time". In 2023, Consequence ranked it at number 9 in its list of the "50 Best Industrial Albums of All Time". Spin named it one of the ten essential industrial records.

== Track listing ==
No.	Title	Length
1.	"Until Death (Us Do Part)"	4:30
2.	"Circling Overland"	4:43
3.	"Im Rhythmus Bleiben"	4:14
4.	"Felines"	3:34
5.	"First In/First Out"	3:52
6.	"Blend the Strengths"	3:13
7.	"Headhunter v3.0"	4:45
8.	"Work 01"	3:28
9.	"Terminal State"	4:09
10.	"Welcome to Paradise v1.0 (CD edition bonus track)"	5:18
Total length:		41:46

1992 reissue bonus tracks
No.	Title	Length
11.	"Headhunter v1.0"	5:01
12.	"Never Stop! v1.0"	3:56
13.	"Work 242 N.Off is N.Off"	5:18
14.	"Agony (Until Death)"	2:43
15.	"Never Stop! v.1.1"	4:24
16.	"Work 242"	6:29
Total length:		69:37

=== Notes ===
The 1992 bonus tracks were originally released on the Never Stop! EP, except for "Headhunter v1.0" which was originally released on the Headhunter EP.

== Personnel ==
=== Front 242 ===
- Jean-Luc De Meyer – vocals
- Daniel Bressanutti – keyboards
- Patrick Codenys – keyboards
- Richard Jonckheere – drums

=== Additional personnel ===
- Frédéric Boebaert – art direction
- Greg Calbi – mastering, remastering
- Alain Verbaert – photography
