= Pulse (Front 242 album) =

2003 studio album by Front 242

Studio album by Front 242
- Released: May 6, 2003
- Studios: Art & Strategy
- Genres: Industrial; EBM; techno; IDM; electro
- Length: 74:07
- Label: Metropolis Records
- Producer: Daniel Bressanutti

Front 242 chronology
| Still & Raw (2003) | Pulse (2003) |

(Filtered) Pulse cover
- Released in 2016

Pulse is the eighth and final studio album by Front 242, released on May 6, 2003 through Metropolis Records. It was the group's first full-length studio release in ten years since 1993's 05:22:09:12 Off, marking their largest gap between albums. In 2016, a restructured version of Pulse was released under the title (Filtered) Pulse.

== Content ==
Pulse is a blend of electronic body music and industrial music. Unusually for Front 242, the album predominantly comprises a set of suites divided into sub-tracks.

=== (Filtered) Pulse reissue ===
On June 24, 2016, a restructured, heavily shortened, and remastered version of Pulse was released under the title (Filtered) Pulse. It was released through Alfa Matrix as part of Front 242's thirty-fifth anniversary series of reissues. This release was organized by Front 242's own Daniel Bressanutti.

== Critical reception ==
Professional ratings
Review scores
| Source | Rating |
|---|---|
| AllMusic | 4/5 stars |
| Exclaim! | Unfavorable |
| Release Magazine | 6/10 stars |
| Uncut | 1/5 |

Pulse received mostly mixed reviews. John Bush of AllMusic appreciated the album, writing, "Pulse sounds like the record Front 242 wanted to make, the type they could make only once the pressure was off." Release Magazine's John Carlsson was more indifferent, praising its technical construction, but deeming it samey and unchallenging. Writing for Exclaim!, Coreen Wolanski lamented how Front 242 had fallen from being the indisputable pioneers of electronic body music to being so repetitive. Uncut magazine provided the most scathing review, writing, "Had this record been released in 1988, it would have been hailed a masterpiece. But memories of the glory days of 'Headhunter' have receded, and the rest of the world has long since caught up with and overtaken Front 242."

== Track listing ==
| No. | Title | Length |
|---|---|---|
| 1. | "SEQ666" (P) | 4:02 |
| 2. | "SEQ666" (U) | 1:13 |
| 3. | "SEQ666" (L) | 1:20 |
| 4. | "SEQ666" (S) | 0:50 |
| 5. | "SEQ666" (E) | 5:09 |
| 6. | "Together" | 5:27 |
| 7. | "Triple X Girlfriend" | 3:45 |
| 8. | "No More No More" | 7:23 |
| 9. | "Beyond the Scale of Comprehension" | 7:22 |
| 10. | "Song" (Untitled) | 3:58 |
| 11. | "Song" (StarCandy) | 2:40 |
| 12. | "One" (With the Fire) | 3:26 |
| 13. | "One" (Reverse) | 2:23 |
| 14. | "Matrix" (OpenStatic) | 2:24 |
| 15. | "Matrix" (MegaHertz) | 3:50 |
| 16. | "Never Lost" (Faust) | 3:41 |
| 17. | "Never Lost" (Riley) | 7:01 |
| 18. | "7Rain" (Filter) | 4:10 |
| 19. | "Pan" (Dhe) | 1:56 |
| 20. | "Pan" (Mihk) | 3:07 |
| Total length: | | 74:07 |

(Filtered) Pulse reissue
| No. | Title | Length |
|---|---|---|
| 1. | "7Rain" | 3:47 |
| 2. | "Together" | 5:22 |
| 3. | "Loud" | 3:54 |
| 4. | "Strobe" | 3:24 |
| 5. | "One" | 3:25 |
| 6. | "Matrix" | 6:12 |
| 7. | "TripleXXXgirlfriend" | 3:42 |
| 8. | "Collision" | 5:10 |
| 9. | "Strobe (Fragments)" | 4:13 |
| Total length: | | 39:09 |

== Personnel ==
All credits adapted from Pulse liner notes.

- Jean-Luc De Meyer – lead vocals
- Richard Jonckheere – percussion, backing vocals
- Daniel Bressanutti – graphic design, mixing, producing, publishing
- Patrick Codenys – mixing, producing, publishing

== Chart positions ==
| Chart (2003) | Peak position |
|---|---|
| US Top Dance Albums (Billboard) | 20 |

== "Pulse" single ==
"Pulse"

Single by Front 242

from the album Pulse
- Released: 2003
- Length: 28:54
- Label: XIII BIS Records
- Producer: Daniel Bressanutti

In advance of both Still & Raw and Pulse, the single "Pulse" was released through the French label XIII BIS Records.

=== Track listing ===
| No. | Title | Length |
|---|---|---|
| 1. | "Seq666 - PULSE: "1. Seq666 - P"; "2. Seq666 - U"; "3. Seq666 - L"; "4. Seq666 - S"; "5. Seq666 - E" | 12:33 |
| 2. | "Triple X Girlfriend" | 3:42 |
| 3. | "One: "1. With the Fire"; "2. • Reverse" | 5:49 |
| 4. | "Song: "1. StarCandy"; "2. • Untitled" | 6:50 |
| Total length: | | 28:54 |

=== Personnel ===
All credits adapted from "Pulse" liner notes.

- Jean-Luc De Meyer – lead vocals
- Richard Jonckheere – percussion, backing vocals
- Daniel Bressanutti – graphic design, mixing, producing, publishing
- Patrick Codenys – mixing, producing, publishing

== Still & Raw EP ==
Still & Raw

EP by Front 242
- Released: April 8, 2003
- Length: 27:56
- Label: Metropolis Records

Still & Raw is an EP by Front 242 released on April 8, 2003 through Metropolis Records. It was intended to be a preview of Pulse. Like the music on that succeeding album, Still & Raw's sound is calm and slow. In 2016, a compilation combining Pulse and Still & Raw was released. Matthew Jeanes of Brainwashed wrote about the EP, "Still & Raw isn't liable to turn the heads of those firmly glued to Mille Plateaux and Rephlex platters, but It's a worthwhile effort from an old standby that warrants a listen if you were a fan and at least a glimpse if you weren't."

=== Track listing ===
| No. | Title | Length |
|---|---|---|
| 1. | "7Rain" | 3:52 |
| 2. | "Loud" | 3:58 |
| 3. | "Strobe" | 3:27 |
| 4. | "Collision" | 5:13 |
| 5. | "7Rain (GHost)" | 4:05 |
| 6. | "Strobe (Fragments)" | 7:21 |
| Total length: | | 27:56 |

=== Personnel ===
All credits adapted from Still & Raw liner notes.

- Jean-Luc De Meyer – lead vocals
- Richard Jonckheere – percussion, backing vocals
- Daniel Bressanutti – graphic design, mixing, producing, publishing
- Patrick Codenys – mixing, producing, publishing
