= ThefucKINGFUCKS =

Belgian performance art group

thefucKINGFUCKS
- Also known as: Red Sniper, S338, SUITE 338, PostPunkPaganPop, Head Sniper
- Origin: Belgium
- Genres: Industrial rock Alternative rock Performance art
- Years active: 2003 - present
- Members: Kendell Geers; Patrick Codenys
- Past members: Lisbeth Gruwez; Heike Langsdorf; Tawny Anderson; Florence Augendre; Ilse Ghekiere; Georgina Teunissen; Geneviève Lagravière; Marina Abramović; Stanilas de Rola Klossowski

thefucKINGFUCKS is a Belgian underground industrial rock performance art group that began as a musical side project for controversial visual artist Kendell Geers and Patrick Codenys of Front 242. Since 2007, they have collaborated with choreographer and performer Ilse Ghekiere from Charleroi Danses. However, Ghekiere left in 2009 to pursue her solo career.

The group was launched in April 2003 at the Pompidou Centre in Paris with a concert titled "Prototype" under the name "Red Sniper." Since then, they have performed at various music festivals, including the Elektra Festival Electronic Festival in Montreal, Canada; a concert called "10 Guests" curated by Revolting Cocks founding member Luc van Acker; "Guided by Heroes" curated by fashion designer Raf Simons for Z33 in Hasselt; and the Techno Music Festival 10DAYSOFF in Gent. Bootleg recordings of these concerts are available for download on pirate torrent sites.

== Background ==
thefucKINGFUCKS is an open-source artist collective strongly influenced by the ideas and theories of the Acéphale group founded by Georges Bataille in the 1930s. The collective operates as both an experimental esoteric research group and an exoteric performance art and music group. They conduct secretive research into the history and nature of rituals, rites, initiation, sacred sexuality, and magick, translating these findings into public forms such as performance, art, music, dance, and installation.

Following the Acéphale model, the group rejects all forms of social and political hierarchy and opposes authoritarian leadership in both their structure and production. While the operative members change, the core of the group has remained constant since its inception in 2003. They challenge the divisions between art forms and insist on working simultaneously across dance, music, and the visual arts. The collective frequently presents their performances or actions alongside their more prominent productions. For example, "PostPunkPaganPop" was the title of a solo exhibition by Kendell Geers at the Depuryluxemburg Gallery in Zurich in June 2008. At the opening, he presented a performance with the same name as "thefucKINGFUCKS." The title was also used for a performance by thefucKINGFUCKS at the Cimatics V.J. Festival in Brussels in 2007 and at the S.M.A.K. Museum in Gent.

== Name ==
The group chose the name thefucKINGFUCKS because the word "FUCK" remains forbidden on most television channels, especially on MTV, to which the group is generally opposed. They selected the name "thefucKINGFUCKS" (a line from the David Lynch film Blue Velvet) to prevent assimilation into mainstream media.

== PostPunkPaganPop ==
The term PostPunkPaganPop has been used by Geers to describe both his own work and that of thefucKINGFUCKS. Post-punk defines an attitude as well as a musical genre, while pagan reflects the group's interest in rites, rituals, and questions of faith. The public face of the group retains the pop-centered style of music that Codenys became famous for in the 1980s.

== LostLustLast ==
On 26 June 2008, Kendell Geers and Ilse Ghekiere presented their collaborative work in an installation at the Royal Monceau "Demolition Party" in Paris. The installation, titled "LostLustLast," was described as "an orgy of ink that resembled the scene of a crime of passion." The pair worked on-site for a week, using the body to imprint images on the walls, floor, and bed.

== Body sound image ==
The performances offer an audio-visual-sensory experience. In the 1980s, Patrick Codenys used the term electronic body music to describe the music of Front 242. A generation later, Kendell Geers defines his art as "Panaesthetik," a term that aims to describe an all-encompassing notion of aesthetics. Together with Ilse Ghekiere, their performances provide a sensory overload, pushing the limits of hearing, seeing, smelling, and even touching. Geers' razorblade installations serve as the backdrop to the grinding electronic body music rhythms and beats of Codenys, while Ghekiere's erotic trance performances are key to unlocking the mystery. Reflecting their interest in the dark arts, the sounds often dwell in the extreme low sub-bass frequencies, felt more in the pit of the stomach than heard with the ears.

== Multiple names ==
Since 2004, thefucKINGFUCKS have performed under various names, including "Red Sniper," "Head Sniper," "Firewire," "Akephale," "Kissing Kousins," "USB2," "PostPunkPaganPop," "S338," and "Suite 338." The number 338 is frequently used by the group as a reference to Front 242 because United Nations Resolution 338 is an annex to Resolution 242.
