= Tyranny (For You) =

Studio album by Front 242
- Released: 24 January 1991
- Genre: EBM, industrial
- Length: 46:39 (54:49)
- Label: Red Rhino Europe; Epic
- Producer: Daniel Bresanutti, Patrick Codenys

Front 242 chronology
Front by Front (1988)	Tyranny (For You) (1991)	Live Target (1992)

Singles from Tyranny (For You)
- 1. "Tragedy (For You)" Released: 23 October 1990; 2. "Rhythm Of Time" Released: 1991; 3. "Mixed by Fear" Released: 1991

Professional ratings
Review scores
Source	Rating
AllMusic	3.5/5 stars
Encyclopedia of Popular Music	3/5 stars
Entertainment Weekly	C
MusicHound	3.5/5
NME	7/10
Select	4/5
Sounds	4/5 stars

Tyranny (For You) (stylized as TYRANNY ▶ FOR YOU ◀) is the fifth studio album by Front 242, released in 1991 as their first album on Epic Records after leaving Chicago's Wax Trax! Records. It was the band's highest-charting album reaching #95 on the Billboard 200 and #5 on the CMJ Radio Top 150. The song "Rhythm of Time" peaked at No. 11 on the Billboard Hot Dance/Disco chart, matching the previous ranking of the album's title track. The accompanying music video for "Rhythm of Time" appears briefly playing on a television in a scene in the film Single White Female. "Moldavia" was subsequently featured in TV promos for the 1992 film K2.

== Track listing ==
- All songs written by Front 242 & published by Les Editions Confidentielles.

No.	Title	Length
1.	"Sacrifice"	4:31
2.	"Rhythm of Time"	4:06
3.	"Moldavia"	4:25
4.	"Trigger 2" (Anatomy of a Shot)	5:50
5.	"Gripped by Fear"	4:36
6.	"Tragedy ▶For You◀"	4:30
7.	"The Untold"	4:33
8.	"Neurobashing"	5:49
9.	"Leitmotiv 136"	3:12
10.	"Soul Manager" "Soul Manager" no audio "Hard Rock" "Trigger 1"	13:03; 5:07; 1:58; 2:40; 3:16
Total length:		54:53

== Releases ==
- Red Rhino Europe: RRE CD 11 – CD, 1991
- Red Rhino Europe: RRE LP 11 – 12" Vinyl, 1991
- Epic Records (USA & Canada): EK 46998 – CD, 1991
- Epic Records (USA & Canada): ET 46998 – Cassette, 1991

== Personnel ==
- Jean-Luc De Meyer – lead vocals
- Daniel Bressanutti – keyboards, programming
- Patrick Codenys – keyboards, programming
- Richard Jonckheere – percussion, backing vocals
