= No Comment (Front 242 album) =

Studio album by Front 242
- Released: September 1984
- Recorded: 1984
- Genre: EBM, industrial
- Length: 34:19 (Another Side, Red Rhino, Wax Trax! CD); 33:35 (Wax Trax! Cassette); 52:21 (Epic CD)
- Label: Another Side; Red Rhino Europe; Animalized; Wax Trax! Epic
- Producer: Front 242

Front 242 chronology
Geography (1982)	No Comment (1984)	Official Version (1987)

Alternative cover
- 1985 Red Rhino & Wax Trax releases cover

Alternative cover
- 1992 Epic release cover

Professional ratings
Review scores
Source	Rating
AllMusic	2.5/5 stars

No Comment is a 1984 Front 242 album released on the Another Side music label. The album made the first reference to Electronic Body Music (EBM) with the phrase "Electronic Body Music Composed and Produced On Eight Tracks by Front 242", in reference to their use of an 8-track recording device. Though the album was their second full-length album, the Belgian band had released several singles and EPs prior to No Comment. The dialogue samples featured in the track "Special Forces" are from the movie Apocalypse Now.

== Track listing ==
No Comment has been released multiple times in both LP and CD formats in Belgium, Germany, and the United States. The following is a list of the tracks on all the significant releases of this album.

=== Another Side (1984) and Wax Trax! (1985) LP versions ===
Side A
No.	Title	Length
1.	"Commando Mix"	9:23
2.	"S.FR. Nomenklatura" (1&2)	6:36
3.	"Deceit (Behind Your Face)"	3:44
Total length:		19:43

Side B
No.	Title	Length
4.	"Lovely Day"	5:23
5.	"No Shuffle"	3:50
6.	"Special Forces"	5:23
Total length:		14:36

Note : initial copies of the Wax Trax! LP also contained a bonus live 7" single

=== Red Rhino CD version (1985) ===
No.	Title	Length
1.	"Commando Mix"	9:23
2.	"Deceit" (Behind Your Face)	3:44
3.	"Lovely Day"	5:23
4.	"No Shuffle"	3:50
5.	"Special Forces"	5:23
6.	"S.FR. Nomenklatura" (Parts 1&2)	6:36
Total length:		34:19

=== Wax Trax! CD version (1988) ===
No.	Title	Length
1.	"Commando Mix"	9:23
2.	"Deceit"	3:44
3.	"Lovely Day"	5:23
4.	"No Shuffle"	3:50
5.	"Special Forces"	5:23
6.	"S.FR. Nomenklatura" (Parts 1&2)	6:36
Total length:		34:19

=== Wax Trax! Cassette Version (1989) ===
Side 1
No.	Title	Length
1.	"Commando Mix"	9:05
2.	"Deceit"	3:44
3.	"Lovely Day"	5:16
Total length:		18:05

Side 2
No.	Title	Length
4.	"No Shuffle"	3:48
5.	"Special Forces"	5:18
6.	"S.FR. Nomenklatura"	6:24
Total length:		15:30

=== Epic CD version (1992) ===
No.	Title	Length
1.	"Commando Mix"	9:23
2.	"Deceit"	3:44
3.	"Lovely Day"	5:23
4.	"No Shuffle"	3:50
5.	"Special Forces"	5:23
6.	"S.FR. Nomenklatura I"	4:26
7.	"S.FR. Nomenklatura II"	2:10
8.	"Body to Body"	4:15
9.	"See the Future" (Live)	6:20
10.	"In November" (Live)	2:37
11.	"Special Forces" (Demo)	4:50
Total length:		52:21

The 1992 Epic Records rerelease of No Comment slightly changed the EBM reference, which read "Electronic body music recorded on 8 tracks".

== Credits ==
- Jean-Luc de Meyer – lead vocals
- Daniel Bresanutti – keyboards, programming, live mixing
- Patrick Codenys – keyboards, programming, sampling
- Richard Jonckheere – percussion, backing vocals
