= 06:21:03:11 Up Evil =

Studio album by Front 242
- Released: May 25, 1993
- Genre: Electro-industrial
- Length: 58:36
- Labels: Red Rhino Europe; Epic
- Producer: Front 242

Front 242 chronology
Live Target (1992)	06:21:03:11 Up Evil (1993)	05:22:09:12 Off (1993)

Professional ratings
Review scores
Source	Rating
AllMusic	3/5 stars
The Encyclopedia of Popular Music	3/5 stars
Entertainment Weekly	B−

06:21:03:11 Up Evil is the sixth studio album by Front 242, released in 1993.

== Album title ==
Utilising a simple alphanumeric conversion from numbers to letters, i.e. 1=A, 2=B, 3=C, ..., 26=Z, the title can be interpreted as:

- 06 = F
- 21 = U
- 03 = C
- 11 = K

Which gives a full album title of Fuck Up Evil.

== Critical reception ==
Trouser Press called the album "strong but not striking," and preferred 05:22:09:12 Off. Entertainment Weekly called it "a tad ambitious," writing that "this aural exorcist is more gripping than previous efforts."

== Track listing ==
All tracks are written by Front 242.

No.	Title	Length
1.	"Crapage"	4:57
2.	"Waste"	4:12
3.	"Skin"	3:34
4.	"Motion"	3:50
5.	"Religion"	4:05
6.	"Stratoscape"	4:34
7.	"Hymn"	3:26
8.	"Fuel"	4:46
9.	"Melt"	3:30
10.	"Flag"	5:08
11.	"Mutilate"	4:10
12.	"(S)Crapage"	6:11
13.	"Religion" (Pussy Whipped Mix)	6:06

Track 12 & 13 on CD version only.

== Personnel ==
- Daniel Bressanutti – Producer
- Patrick Codenys – Producer
- Jean-Luc de Meyer – Vocals
- Craig Leon – Director, Engineer
- Rob Sutton – Engineer
- J. G. Thirlwell – Producer, Remixing
- Andy Wallace – Mixing
- Cassell Webb – Director, Vocals (background), Engineer
