= Geography (Front 242 album) =

Studio album by Front 242
- Released: September 1982
- Recorded: 1982
- Genre: EBM, industrial, new wave, synthpop
- Length: 40:21
- Label: New Dance; Himalaya; Red Rhino Europe; Wax Trax! Animalized; Epic
- Producer: Front 242

Front 242 chronology
Geography (1982)	No Comment (1984)

Alternative cover
- Epic 1992 release cover

Professional ratings
Review scores
Source	Rating
AllMusic	2.5/5 stars
The Encyclopedia of Popular Music	2/5 stars

Geography is the debut album released in 1982 by Belgian electronic music group Front 242.

== Critical reception ==
Dave Thompson, in Alternative Rock, wrote that the album "boasts three dancey gems still being sampled (or spun) today and a clutch of other crucial songs which would be equally influential outside the club scene."

== Track listing ==
No.	Title	Length
1.	"Operating Tracks"	3:48
2.	"With Your Cries"	2:45
3.	"Art & Strategy"	2:16
4.	"Geography II"	1:10
5.	"U. Men"	3:15
6.	"Dialogues"	2:06
7.	"Least Inkling"	2:26
8.	"GVDT"	2:57
9.	"Geography I"	2:14
10.	"Black White Blue"	4:21
11.	"Kinetics"	2:05
12.	"Kampfbereit"	3:21
13.	"Ethics"	2:29
14.	"Principles"	4:43
15.	"Body to Body"	4:13
Total length:		44:09

GEOGRAPHY - VINTAGE REISSUE - LIMITED EDITION (2 CD)

(This double-CD was completely remastered and rebuilt by Daniel Bressanutti. Some tracks differ notably in sound)

CD 1
No.	Title	Notes	Length
1.	"Operating Tracks"		3:53
2.	"With Your Cries"		2:59
3.	"Art + Strategy"		2:16
4.	"Geography II"		1:10
5.	"U. Men"		3:17
6.	"Dialogues"		2:06
7.	"Least Inkling"		2:28
8.	"GVDT"		2:57
9.	"Geography I"		2:29
10.	"Black White Blue"		4:17
11.	"Kinetics"		2:16
12.	"Kampfbereit"		3:26
13.	"He Runs Too Fast for Us"	This song lasts 2:02, and after a long hiatus features the songs "Principles", "Body to Body" and "Ethics", although they weren't tracked as such	15:30
Total length:			49:04

CD2 (Notes are from the booklet)
No.	Title	Length
1.	"Couteau" (Credited to "Prothese")	3:27
2.	"Conditionnel Humain" (Credited to "Prothese")	6:19
3.	"Chanson" (Credited to "Prothese")	3:53
4.	"Syncussion" (Credited to "Underviewer")	3:16
5.	"Mood" (Credited to "Underviewer")	2:27
6.	"Principle" (2Trax)	3:32
7.	"Body to Body" (2Trax)	3:39
8.	"Labo" (Credited to "Underviewer")	3:51
9.	"I Remember" (Credited to "Underviewer")	2:32
10.	"Trouble" (Credited to "Underviewer")	3:39
11.	"U-Men" (Instrumental)	3:29
12.	"Kampfbereit" (Instrumental)	3:37
13.	"In November" (Live VPRO)	2:46
14.	"Controversy Between" (Aerial Version)	3:42
15.	"Sample D." (Aerial Version)	3:28
16.	"Take One" (Rebuilt)	3:48
17.	"See the Future"	5:51
18.	"Take One" (Live VPRO)	4:46
19.	"Kampfbereit" (Live VPRO)	3:27
Total length:		1:12:35

=== Samples ===
The 1971 science fiction film THX 1138 was sampled in the song "Operating Tracks".
