= 05:22:09:12 Off =

Studio album by Front 242
- Released: November 2, 1993
- Recorded: Art & Strategy Studio
- Genre: EBM, industrial, hardcore techno
- Length: 71:12
- Label: Red Rhino Europe; Epic
- Producer: Daniel Bressanutti; Patrick Codenys

Front 242 chronology
06:21:03:11 Up Evil (1993)	05:22:09:12 Off (1993)	Live Code (1995)

05:22:09:12 Off is the seventh studio album by Belgian industrial/EBM group Front 242, released by Sony on 2 November 1993. The album peaked at #27 on the CMJ Radio Top 150.

The album's title is a simple substitution cipher for the word "evil"; where each letter is represented by its equivalent numerical position in the alphabet. The recording features members of a New York City-based band called Spill after an attempt to record the act in Belgium failed to materialize. Kristin "99" Kowalski of Spill was the only woman to record lead vocals for Front 242, and some vocal contributions are also provided by Spill's Eran Westwood. The band's long-time vocalist, Jean-Luc De Meyer, only appears on a remix of the song Melt.

== Reception ==
Professional ratings
Review scores
Source	Rating
AllMusic	4/5 stars
Melody Maker	Positive

The album has received a mostly favorable reception from critics.

== Track listing ==
All tracks are written by Front 242.

No.	Title	Length
1.	"Animal (Cage)"	3:00
2.	"Animal (Gate)"	3:02
3.	"Animal (Guide)"	2:44
4.	"Modern Angel"	4:12
5.	"Junkdrome"	7:35
6.	"Serial Killers Don't Kill Their Girlfriend"	5:58
7.	"Skin (Fur Coat)"	3:59
8.	"GenEcide"	6:53
9.	"Crushed"	6:13
10.	"offEND"	1:38
11.	"Animal (Zoo)"	4:02
12.	"Serial Killers Don't Kill Their Boyfriend"	3:09
13.	"Happiness (More Angels)"	6:38
14.	"Crushed (Obscene)"	4:11
15.	"Melt (Again)"	5:06
16.	"Speed Angels"	2:52

Track 14 & 15 on CD version only.

== Personnel ==
- Daniel Bressanutti – Producer, Mixing
- Patrick Codenys – Producer, Mixing
- John Dubs – Producer
- Bob Ludwig – Mastering
- Eran Westwood – Producer, Mixing
- Jean-Luc De Meyer – vocals
- Kristin Kowalski – vocals
- Daniel Bressanutti – keyboards, programming, live mixing
- Patrick Codenys – keyboards, programming, samplers
- Richard Jonckheere, often credited as "Richard 23" – percussion, vocals
