= Official Version =

Album by Front 242

Studio album by Front 242
- Released: March 1987
- Genre: EBM, industrial
- Length: 38:50; 48:51 original CD issue 60:28 Epic CD issue
- Label: Red Rhino Europe; Wax Trax! Animalized; Epic
- Producer: Front 242

Front 242 chronology
No Comment (1984)	Official Version (1987)	Back Catalogue (1987)

Singles from Official Version
- 1. "Quite Unusual" Released: October 1986; 2. "Masterhit" Released: 1987

1992 Epic release cover

Official Version is the third studio album by Front 242, released in March 1987 and re-released in 1992.

== Track listing ==
No.	Title	Length
1.	"W.Y.H.I.W.Y.G."	7:28
2.	"Rerun Time"	5:25
3.	"Television Station"	2:41
4.	"Agressiva Due"	2:58
5.	"Master Hit" (Part 1 & 2")	7:07
6.	"Slaughter"	3:36
7.	"Quite Unusual"	3:49
8.	"Red Team"	3:50
9.	"Angst"	1:56
Total length:		38:50

CD Bonus Tracks
No.	Title	Length
10.	"Quite Unusual" (12" Version)	5:02
11.	"Agressiva" (12" Version)	4:59
Total length:		48:51

1992 Epic release
No.	Title	Length
12.	"Masterblaster"	7:06
13.	"Hypnomix"	4:31
Total length:		60:28

=== Notes ===
The CD version of the original issue included 12" mixes of "Quite Unusual" and "Agressiva", giving the disc 11 tracks. The 1992 issue of the album added the first two songs from the "Masterhit" 12", bringing the track count to 13.

== Reception ==
Professional ratings
Review scores
Source	Rating
AllMusic	4/5 stars
Christgau's Record Guide	B−
Encyclopedia of Popular Music	4/5 stars
MusicHound	5/5
NME	6/10
Select	4/5

AllMusic's Ned Raggett rated the album 4 stars out of 5, describing it as "amazing" and "brutal", "helping to fully define industrial in the broadest sense of the term." Robert Christgau wrote that "the worst you could say of them is that their club and cult hits don't exactly carpet-bomb the sensorium." MusicHound described Official Version as "chock full of music that is guaranteed to make your heart race and your toes tap."

In 2023, Consequence ranked it at number 47 in its list of the "50 Best Industrial Albums of All Time" and wrote that "even after 35 years, still sounds like a missive sent back to us from a dystopian future."

== Personnel ==
- Daniel Bressanutti
- Patrick Codenys
- Jean-Luc De Meyer
- Richard Jonckheere
- F. Boebaert – art Direction
- Greg Calbi – remastering
- A. Verbaert, Front 242, L. Van Praet – photography
