= Front 242 =

Belgian electronic music group

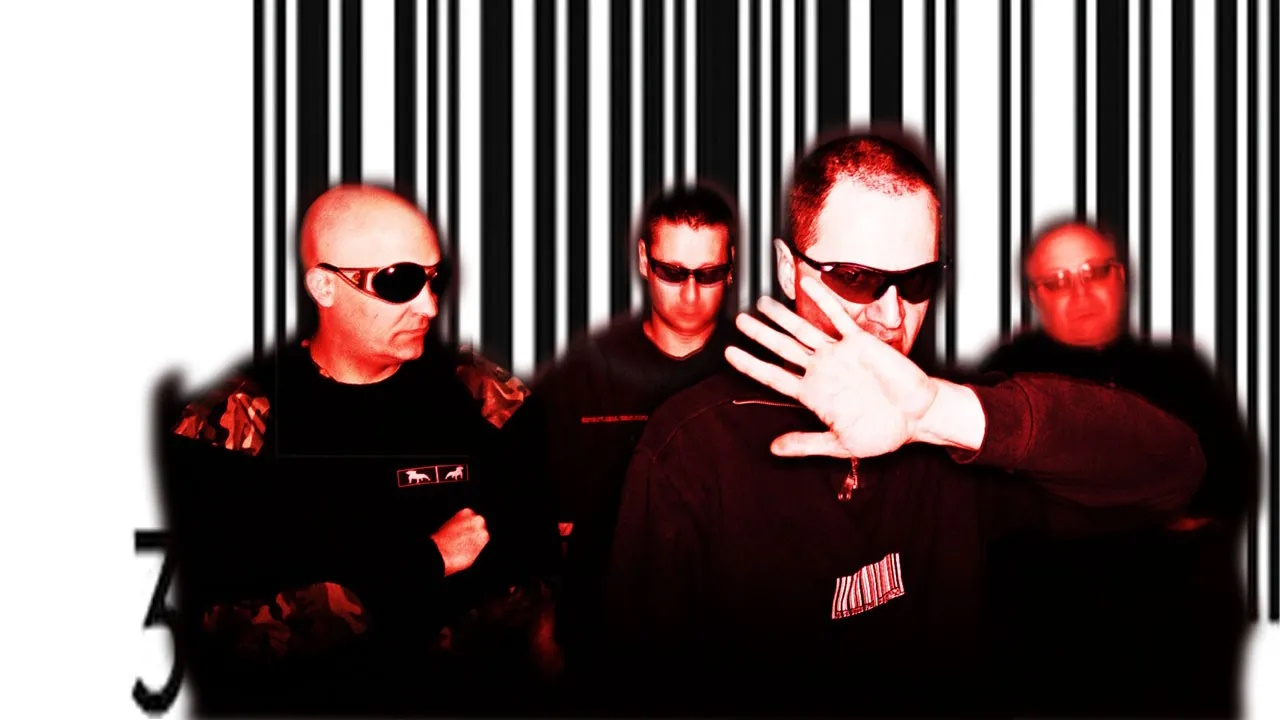

Background information
- Origin: Aarschot, Belgium
- Genres: Industrial dance; EBM; electronic
- Years active: 1981–2025
- Labels: Another Side; Red Rhino Europe; Animalized; Wax Trax!; Epic; XIII Bis Records; Alfa Matrix
- Spinoffs: Cobalt 60; C-Tec; Revolting Cocks
- Members: Daniel Bressanutti; Jean-Luc De Meyer; Patrick Codenys; Richard Jonckheere; Tim Kroker
- Past members: Dirk Bergen; Jean-Marc Pauly; Pierre Pauly; Kristin Kowalski; Eran Westwood; John Dubs; Jean-Marc Lederman
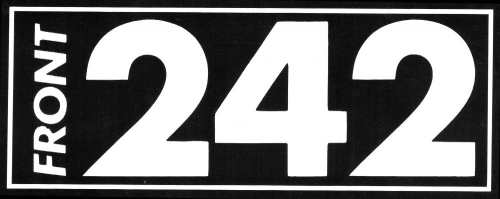
- Website: front242.com

Front 242 were a Belgian electronic music group that came into prominence during the 1980s. Pioneering the style they called electronic body music, they influenced the electronic and industrial music genres.

== History ==
=== Formation ===
Front 242 were formed in 1981 in Aarschot, near Leuven, Belgium, by Daniel Bressanutti and Dirk Bergen, who wanted to create music and graphic design using emerging electronic tools. Prior to forming Front 242, Bressanutti worked on a music project called "Prothese" that had already produced several one-off tracks. The front part of the name comes from the idea of an organized popular uprising and the fact that the word can be translated in many languages while retaining the same meaning. The first single by the duo, "Principles", with b-side "Body To Body," was released in 1981.

Patrick Codenys and Jean-Luc De Meyer had separately formed a group called "Underviewer" at around the same time. The groups merged in 1982 after Underviewer had given their demo tapes to Bressanutti who was working at Hill's Music musical instrument shop in Brussels at the time. Bressanutti was sufficiently impressed to ask Codenys and De Meyer to join Front 242.

Recordings by the band were initially created in Bressanutti's apartment studio, where the entire band and their equipment were packed into a 2.5 m × 2.5 m (8 ft 2 in × 8 ft 2 in) room. The band incorporated as an artistic association in Belgium which allowed them to access government assistance and made it easier to afford better studio equipment.

Bressanutti, Codenys and De Meyer took turns on vocals at first, until they settled on De Meyer as the lead vocalist (early recordings with Bressanutti on vocals were subsequently released in 2004). De Meyer came to write most of the lyrics, although Valerie Jane Steele wrote several tracks including "Don't Crash." Despite falling into specific roles, however, the band sought to project a more anonymous, mysterious image, replete with dark sunglasses and militaristic uniforms so that they could not be easily identified. Bressanutti took this concept of anonymity to the extreme, becoming a "silent" member who did not appear in photos or videos until the early 1990s, nor did he perform onstage with the band. He did continue to tour, mixing the live sound and controlling pre-recorded or sequenced elements from the sound board behind the audience.

The band self-released their first album, Geography, in 1982 and shortly after signed to the Belgian indie label consortium Les Disques du Crépuscule who later re-released the album. Their next single, "U-Men", was released the same year as was the band's first music video, produced by Marcel Vanthilt and played on the program RoodVonk on VRT (Vlaamse Radio Televisie - Flemish Radio & TV). The video proved a challenge, not only conceptually given the band's insistence on anonymity, but because of the small budget; ultimately the video was shot on location in Daniel's bedroom.

In 1983, the band brought on Richard Jonckheere (also known as Richard 23), whom they became familiar with through Richard's own "noise concept" as a percussionist and second vocalist to help boost the band's live presence. Not long after, Dirk Bergen left the band to manage the group and pursue a graphic design career. Also in 1983 the band released the EP Endless Riddance.

=== Rising popularity ===
Front 242 became a popular musical group in Belgium, particularly for their "infamous" live performances that involved loud sound, aggressive stage presence, smoke, and bright flashing lights. The music press in Belgium was less receptive, sometimes interpreting their militaristic appearance, dark music, and samples from war movies — especially given the backdrop of the Cold War and terror incidents in Belgium — as being pro-fascist, an interpretation the band firmly rejected.

Their second album, No Comment, released in 1984, was the first to introduce the term electronic body music in association with their sound via the liner notes, which stated: "Electronic body music composed and produced on eight tracks by Front 242." The band followed the release with a European tour.

It was around this time that Front 242 began collaborating with Luc van Acker, who was a familiar presence at Hill's Music. On one occasion, Luc brought his guitar and gear to the band's studio where samples of the session were used in composing the track "No Shuffle." Luc was also known to take the stage with the band at times.

Front 242 signed with the American label Wax Trax! in 1984. At the behest of Alain Jourgensen who was working with Wax Trax at the time, Front 242 were invited to be the support band for Ministry during their upcoming tour in the United States. This tour led to the creation of Revolting Cocks by Richard 23, Luc van Acker, and Alain Jourgensen.

In 1985 the band played the Seaside Festival and the first ever Pukkelpop Festival in Belgium. An incident between the band and security at Pukkelpop led to further negative press for the band. That year they also released the Politics of Pressure EP and a 12" for "No Shuffle."

In 1986, Front 242 turned down a contract with ZTT Records and instead signed with Red Rhino (RRE) in Europe— a sub-label of Play It Again Sam — who released Backcatalogue and Official Version in 1987. Trouser Press credited Official Version with helping Front 242 "emerge from relative obscurity to become a significant cult force, selling records all over the world." In the fall of 1987, Front 242 supported Depeche Mode on the first European leg of their Music for the Masses tour.

In 1988, Front by Front was released, and in December of that same year, "Headhunter" (with a video by Anton Corbijn), became the band's first club hit, reaching number 13 on the US Billboard Dance/Club Play Songs chart.

=== 1990s ===
Tyranny (For You), released in 1991, became the band's highest-charting album, reaching No. 95 on the Billboard 200. Tyranny (For You) was the first album they released under contract with a major corporate label, Sony/Epic, after the widespread popularity of Front by Front. Two further releases were extracted from Tyranny — Mixed by Fear, which contained remixes of the track "Gripped by Fear", and the single "Rhythm of Time", which included a remix by The Orb.

Sony/Epic also acquired the rights to the band's back catalog from Wax Trax! and issued re-released versions of the albums with new cover art and bonus tracks taken from singles and EPs.

In 1992, Bressanutti returned to combining graphic arts with music, taking his lithographs on tour to three U.S. galleries. Bressanutti also composed a solo half-hour atmospheric recording called Art and Strategy (or The Art Corporation) to play during viewings of the lithographs, and released it in a limited edition of 1,000 CDs.

Front 242's style shifted abruptly with each of their next two albums, released in rapid succession in 1993 on Epic's sub-label RRE (originally planned as a double-CD): 06:21:03:11 UP EVIL and 05:22:09:12 OFF (the numbers correspond to letters, spelling "FUCK UP EVIL" and "EVIL OFF"). The band describes the two albums as "based on the duality of good and evil." However, strains were emerging, with the band members apparently having different artistic views. Despite these tensions, they performed on the main stage of the 1993 Lollapalooza tour.

Neither of these albums had significant input from Richard 23, and 05:22:09:12 OFF only included their lead vocalist, Jean-Luc De Meyer, on a remixed track originally from Up Evil. On the other hand, a variety of new contributors were listed as members of Front 242 on these albums: Jean-Marc Pauly and Pierre Pauly (of the Belgian electronic group Parade Ground) on Up Evil, and 99 Kowalski, John Dubs and Eran Westwood on Off.

99 Kowalski is the stage name of Kristin Kowalski, making a tradition out of Richard 23's idea of number-as-name. Kowalski, Dubs and Westwood were originally members of a New York City band called Spill who Bressanutti and Codenys had brought to Belgium to produce their debut album. After the recording sessions fell apart, they contributed to Front 242 on the Off release.

After the release of 06:21:03:11 Up Evil and 05:22:09:12 Off, there was no new material from Front 242 under any lineup. Instead, the band released a stream of live recordings and remixes. However, this period also saw a proliferation of side projects, an inordinate number of which involved De Meyer.

Earlier, Richard 23 played in the Revolting Cocks, and De Meyer had a side project doing vocals for Bigod 20 for their single, "The Bog" in 1990. In 1995, De Meyer met Marc Heal of Cubanate at a Front Line Assembly concert, and the two of them collaborated along with Ged Denton and Jonathan Sharp, to record as Cyber-Tec Project for the new (and short-lived) Cyber-Tec record label.

After the departure of Sharp and the demise of the Cyber-Tec label, the remaining group continued working under the name C-Tec. De Meyer also took over as vocalist for Birmingham 6 for their 1996 album Error of Judgment. That year also saw the debut album Elemental from Cobalt 60, which De Meyer formed with Dominique Lallement and Frederic Sebastien of Reims, France, members of Kriegbereit. This was the start of a number of releases from Cobalt 60, which also did the soundtrack for the video game Wing Commander V. Meanwhile, Richard 23 recorded with the groups Holy Gang, and later, LaTchak.

The four core members of Front 242 regrouped in 1998 to compose radically reworked versions of many of their songs, which they then performed on their first tour in five years, appropriately called the Re:Boot tour. They acknowledged the influence of The Prodigy and their Fat of the Land album in crafting the new, more techno style of Re:Boot.

The new tour material was the subject of Front 242's new recording contract in the U.S. with Metropolis Records. Front 242 also indicated at this time that they were recording new material. However, they had little activity after 1998, making occasional appearances in Europe and Mexico, while Codenys recorded under the name Gaiden with Steve Stoll in 2001.

=== 2000s ===
2002 saw the beginning of a wave of new material from Bresanutti and Codenys, and then from Front 242. In August 2002 a DVD/CD two-disc set called Speed Tribe was released by Dance.com. The DVD was a collaboration with experimental documentary filmmakers Rod Chong and Sharon Matarazzo, who filmed the 2001 24 Hour Le Mans. In the video, the racecars, clouds, rain and spectators form an impressionistic visual backdrop for the music.

Several months later, the first release from Male or Female, also known as Morf, a new project for Bresanutti and Codenys along with vocalist Elko Blijweert. In 2002 and 2003, Morf released an album, an E.P., a double album, and a DVD/CD two-disc combo, on the Belgian record label Alfa Matrix, and went on tour through the U.S.

Then, 2002 and 2003 also saw the release of the new material from Front 242 in a decade: the EP Still & Raw and the album Pulse, released on XIIIBis Records in Europe and Metropolis in the U.S. These represented another iteration of Front 242's explicitly stated goal of reinventing itself. The style of the two new releases is more mellow than some of their past work, using more "glitchy" and "bleepy" sounds. As well, it uses the manipulated voice as a musical instrument. The new releases have a much more emotional style from De Meyer, which was presaged in his later recordings with C-Tec and particularly Cobalt 60 on its album Twelve.

Front 242 promised a new U.S. tour to perform new material from these releases. They have made occasional appearances in Latin America and Europe, even being rejoined by Dirk Bergen for a reunion concert in Aarschot (De Klinker club) in 2004 under the original lineup of Bresanutti, Bergen, Codenys and De Meyer. This performance was kept secret until two days before the show but when the scene magazine Side-Line and the band's label Alfa Matrix launched the news, tickets were quickly sold out.

The band has now also set itself to re-release its entire back catalogue both as a normal CD and as a limited edition consisting of a 2-CD set holding previously unreleased material. For this the band is working together with the Belgian label Alfa Matrix that already took care of releasing the albums of the Front 242 side-project Male Or Female. The first re-release is their debut album Geography, this time newly remastered personally by Bresanutti to surprisingly powerful effect and including 3 extra tracks (two hidden ones) on the normal CD format.

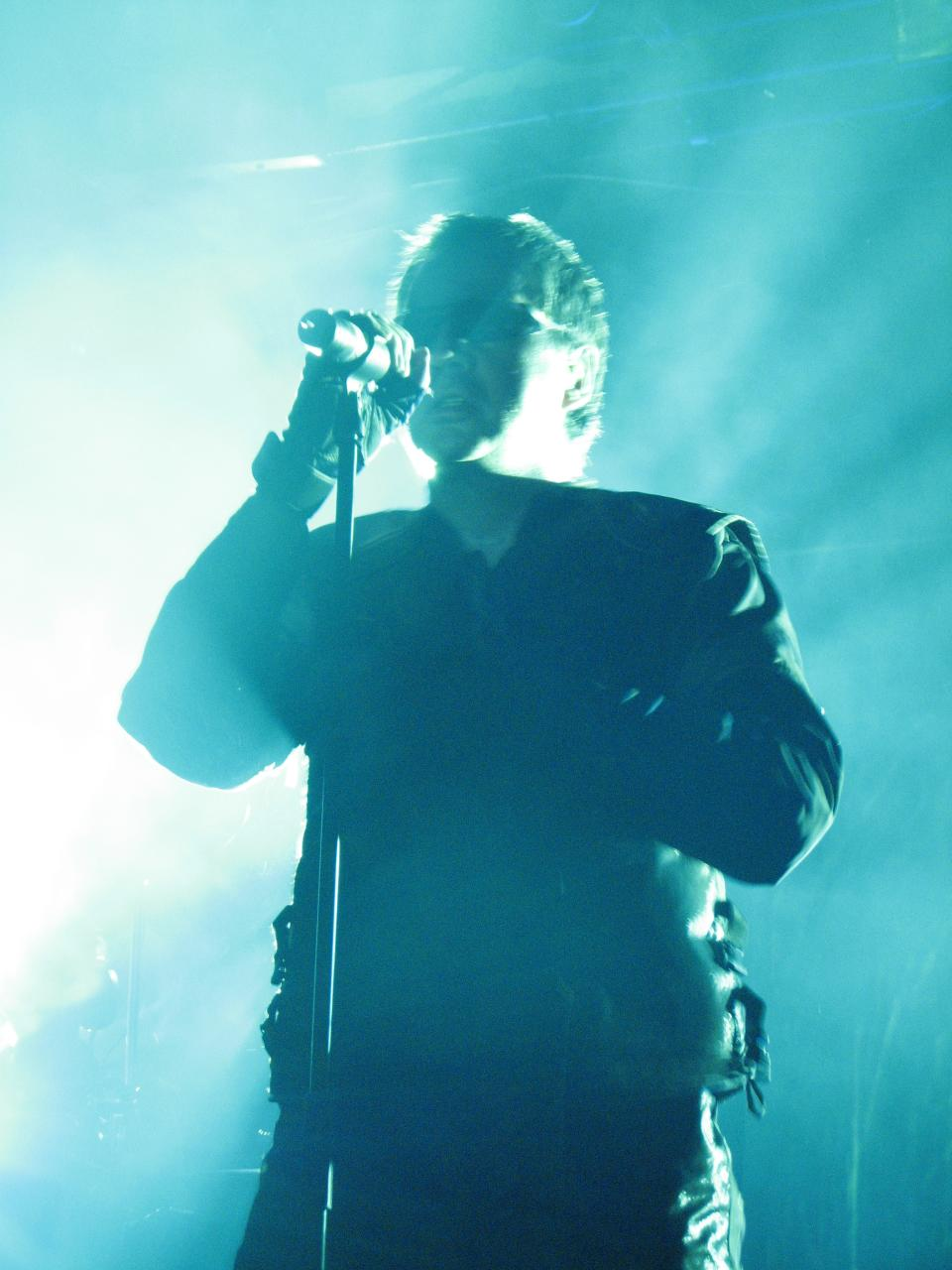
Front 242 at Infest 2008

Meanwhile, their enthusiasm for side projects has continued, as Patrick Codenys started appearing with a new group called Red Sniper, Bresanutti started recording with a new group called Troissoeur, and Codenys and Richard 23 formed a quasi-DJ project called Coder23 which toured in late 2004 and early 2005 as the opening act for VNV Nation. De Meyer contributed vocals on two studio tracks for the Glis album Nemesis in 2005. The lyrical content of the two songs ("The Irreparable" and "La Béatrice") were based on the poems of Charles Baudelaire.

Front 242 toured through twenty venues in North America in November 2005, their first tour as a full band since 2000. The band performed at the Roskilde Festival in 2006. The band's sold out two-day performance at the Ancienne Belgique in Brussels has been recorded for a future release via Alfa Matrix.

In December 2006, Front 242 announced from their MySpace page that they were writing music for a video game called Cipher Complex and provided a link to a teaser trailer with a short sample of one of their scores.

In 2007, De Meyer announced a new project: 32CRASH via the Alfa Matrix label. The band is preparing for an album release in October 2007 after the release of the EP Humanity.

In August 2008, Front 242 played live at the Infest Festival in Bradford, England.

In October 2008, Front 242 performed for the first time in Finland, at the Alternative Party 2008 media arts festival.

=== 2008–present ===
In 2008, the band added two new members: Tim Kroker on percussion and Sylvain Guigon on live video projection and effects.

On 1 June 2008, the Alfa Matrix label announced that Front 242 would make an ultimate statement towards abusive audio compression by releasing the free two-track download, First Moment. By 15 June the same year, the tracks were made available for free on Alfa Matrix's site in medium and high bit-rate MP3s, WAV, FLAC, and M4A formats. Contrary to what fans and some media speculated, the two-track download was not new studio material. Instead, First Moments consisted of two previously unreleased live tracks, "U-Men" and "Im Rhythmus Bleiben", in rather stunning sound quality. It is rumored that over 20,000 people downloaded the tracks within hours of being made available. The label later confirmed that over 25,000 people downloaded the free tracks.

On 4 June 2008, Alfa Matrix announced the release of Moments... The album was a live recording encompassing the best of Front 242's compositions. The album was shipped in several formats including limited CD box sets, vinyl in different colors including 300-copy limited editions, and as a one-disc CD release.

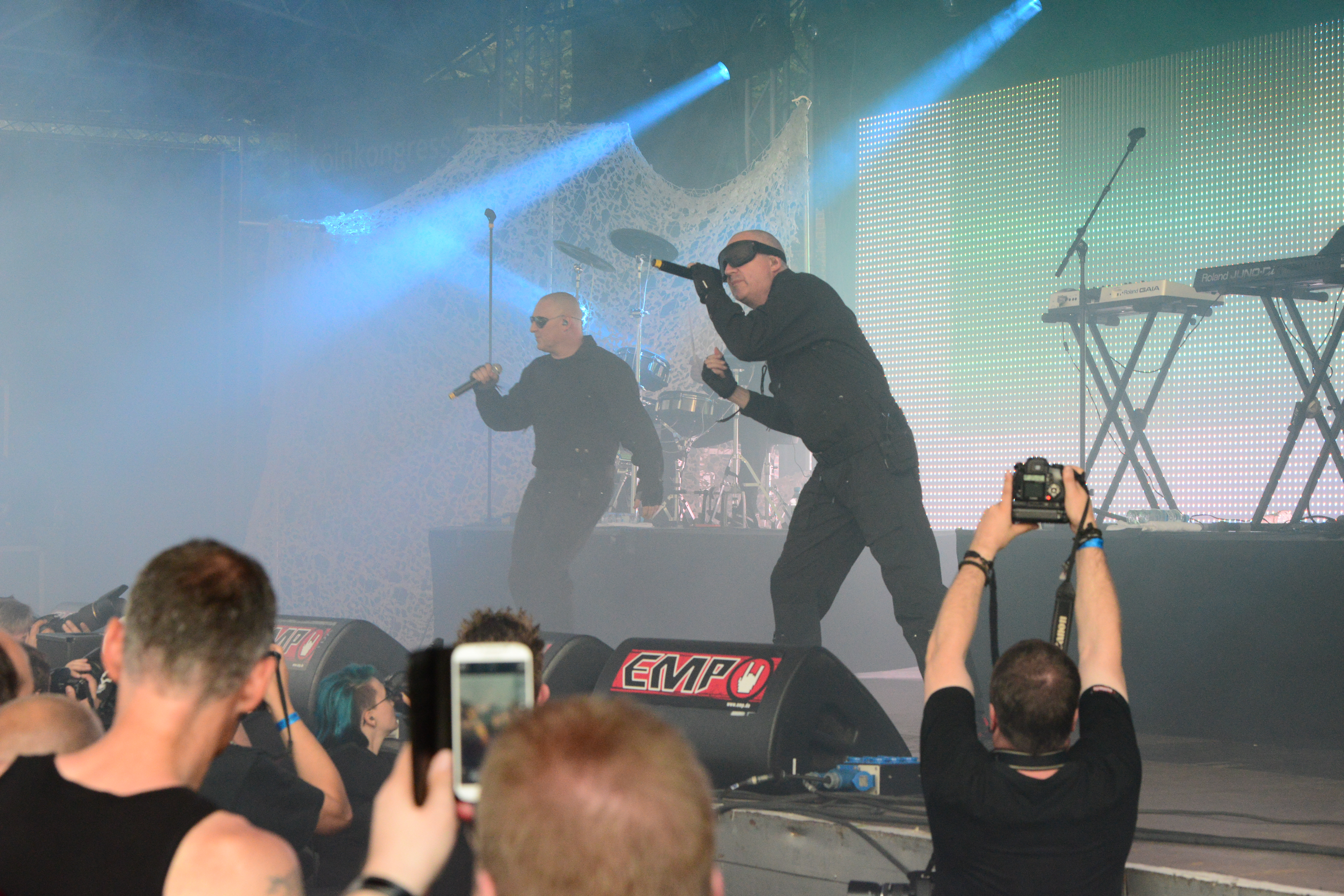
Front 242, Amphi festival 2014

On 15 April 2016, Alfa Matrix released the remastered edition of P.U.L.S.E. The re-release featured the companion Still+Raw EP, in multicolored two-disc CD formats with the special collector box set limited to 1242 copies; this box set included the album in vinyl and CD formats, as well as a 1989 live recording, a laminated live pass, posters, and the Alfa Matrix Sounds from the Matrix 017 compilation.

In February 2020, Front 242 announced the "Black To Square One" US Tour with a planned 13 dates across the country which were to be preceded by a string of concerts in the EU. The US tour was rescheduled for 2021 and many of the European dates were postponed or cancelled due to the global COVID-19 pandemic. The rescheduled 16 date US tour was announced in May 2021 with the first show planned for 15 September 2021, in New York City.

While Front 242 have not released new music since Pulse in 2003, on the "Black To Square One" US Tour they played three 'new' songs: "Generator", "Fix It", and "Deeply Asleep." There is no information on whether these songs or a new studio album will see a release.

In March 2024 Front 242 announced the "Black Out" tour, stated to be their last, after which they will retire from live performance. The band performed their final three shows at Ancienne Belgique in Brussels, Brussels Capital, Belgium on January 23, 24 & 25, 2025, which were streamed and are available on YouTube.

== Influences and style ==
Bressanutti cites musique concrète, avant garde, and the experimental music of Karlheinz Stockhausen as early influences. De Meyer cited Joy Division as an early influence for their "dramatic content." The electro-pop style of Fad Gadget also provided early inspiration for the band. While they were aware of, enjoyed, and learned from musical progenitors such as Klaus Schulze, Kraftwerk, and fellow countrymen Telex, the band did not see their styles as particularly influential. When asked in a 1989 interview about Front 242's being grouped with other industrial bands, Codenys replied that they "were somewhere in between Throbbing Gristle, Kraftwerk, and bands like that, but... wanted to be exclusive, and to have nothing to do with any fashion."

Despite the stated intention of remaining genre-neutral, Front 242 did latch onto a phrase to describe their style: "electronic body music" or EBM; a phrase that would expand into a genre in itself. The band was not the first to use "electronic body music" as a music descriptor. Kraftwerk used the phrase to describe their 1978 album The Man-Machine and the German group Deutsch Amerikanische Freundschaft (DAF) used a similar term - "körpermusik" - to describe their music at the beginning of the 1980s. Despite not having coined the term originally, Front 242 was the first to explicitly claim EBM as a descriptor on the liner notes of their 1984 album No Comment and cemented their claim to the genre when given the lead track on the seminal Play It Again Sam compilation This Is Electronic Body Music in 1988.

== Legacy and cultural influence ==
In the 1980s, Front 242 strived to project a visual mystery and anonymity to accompany their aggressive physical stage performances. The band's ethic is largely responsible for defining the rivethead style of industrial and EBM culture which included the wearing of military gear, such as flak jackets, camouflage, and combat boots, as well as hairstyles, sunglasses, accessories, tattoos, and piercings.

During the 1991 Gulf War, US Navy ships continuously played a list of songs by Front 242 and other bands such as the Ramones, The Clash, and Ministry as a means of boosting morale and aggression during combat operations. The band were informed of this by military personnel who attended their 1993 tour.

A broader public was exposed to Front 242's music in 1992 in the film Single White Female, starring Bridget Fonda and Jennifer Jason Leigh. In the film, obsessed roommate Leigh ties Fonda to a chair but leaves her with the television remote control. In order to attract attention, Fonda tunes in to a music video channel and turns up the volume. The video playing at the time is Front 242's "Rhythm Of Time", from the album Tyranny (For You). Also in 1992, the television commercials for the film K2 were set to the Front 242 song "Moldavia", from the same album.

In 1997, Billboard Encyclopedia featured Front 242 in their "Top 500 Best Producers in Rock History."

== Band members ==
- Daniel Bressanutti – mixing console, keyboards, programming, guitars, live mixing
- Jean-Luc De Meyer – lead vocals
- Patrick Codenys – keyboards, programming, samplers
- Richard Jonckheere ("Richard 23") – electronic percussion, keyboards, backing vocals
- Tim Kroker – electronic drums (guest drummer for live shows)

=== Occasional band members and collaborators ===
- Dirk Bergen – credited as keyboardist on Geography
- Jean-Marc Pauly – credited for writing and composing vocals on 06:21:03:11 Up Evil
- Pierre Pauly – credited for writing and composing vocals on 06:21:03:11 Up Evil
- Kristin Kowalski – credited as writer, composer and vocalist on 05:22:09:12 Off, Animal, and Angels Versus Animals
- Eran Westwood – credited as writer, composer and vocalist on 05:22:09:12 Off, Animal, and Angels Versus Animals
- John Dubs – credited as writer and composer on Animal and Angels Versus Animals
- Jean-Marc Lederman – credited as remixer on Angels Versus Animals
- Valerie Jane Steele – credited as writer on Don't Crash

== Discography ==
- Geography (1982)
- No Comment (1984)
- Official Version (1987)
- Front by Front (1988)
- Tyranny (For You) (1991)
- 06:21:03:11 Up Evil (1993)
- 05:22:09:12 Off (1993)
- Pulse (2003)

== Side projects and guest appearances ==
- 32Crash – Jean-Luc De Meyer
- The Art Corporation – Daniel Bressanutti
- Art & Strategy – Daniel Bressanutti, Patrick Codenys. Single-track CD included with book 'Art & Strategy 92'
- Bigod 20 – Jean-Luc De Meyer, on track "The Bog"
- Birmingham 6 – Jean-Luc De Meyer
- Cobalt 60 – Jean-Luc De Meyer
- Coder 23 – Patrick Codenys, Richard 23
- Cyber-Tec Project/C-Tec – Jean-Luc De Meyer
- Front Line Assembly – Jean-Luc De Meyer – Guest Vocals on track "Future Fail", Artificial Soldier Album
- Gaiden – Patrick Codenys
- Glis – Jean-Luc De Meyer – Guest Vocals on "The Irreparable" and "La Béatrice" ("Nemesis" Album)
- Grisha Zeme – Daniel Bressanutti, Patrick Codenys
- Haujobb - Jean-Luc De Meyer, on Track (and music video) "We Must Wait"
- Holy Gang – Richard 23
- Implant – Jean-Luc de Meyer, on track "The Creature"
- thefucKINGFUCKS – Patrick Codenys
- Komor Kommando – Jean-Luc De Meyer – Guest Vocals on track "John the Revelator", Alfa Matrix Re:Covered – A Tribute to Depeche Mode Album
- LaTchak – Richard 23
- Male Or Female – Daniel Bressanutti, Patrick Codenys
- Ministry – Richard 23, background vocals on track "The Nature Of Love"
- Modern Cubism – Jean-Luc De Meyer
- Nothing but Noise – Daniel Bressanutti, Dirk Bergen
- Parade Ground – Patrick Codenys on Album "Rosary"
- Psy'Aviah – Jean-Luc De Meyer – Guest Vocals on track "Ophelie", Eclectric Album
- Prothese – Daniel Bressanutti, Dirk Bergen
- Punish Yourself – Jean-Luc de Meyer, on Track "Voodoo Virus"
- Red Sniper – Patrick Codenys
- Revolting Cocks – Richard 23
- Speed Tribe – Daniel Bressanutti, Patrick Codenys
- Troissoeur – Daniel Bressanutti, as Remixer
- Underviewer – Patrick Codenys, Jean-Luc De Meyer

== Sources ==
"Front 242". Belpop. Season 1. Episode 5 (in Belgian Dutch). 16 December 2008. Canvas.
