= Richard Jonckheere =

Belgian musician (born 1963)

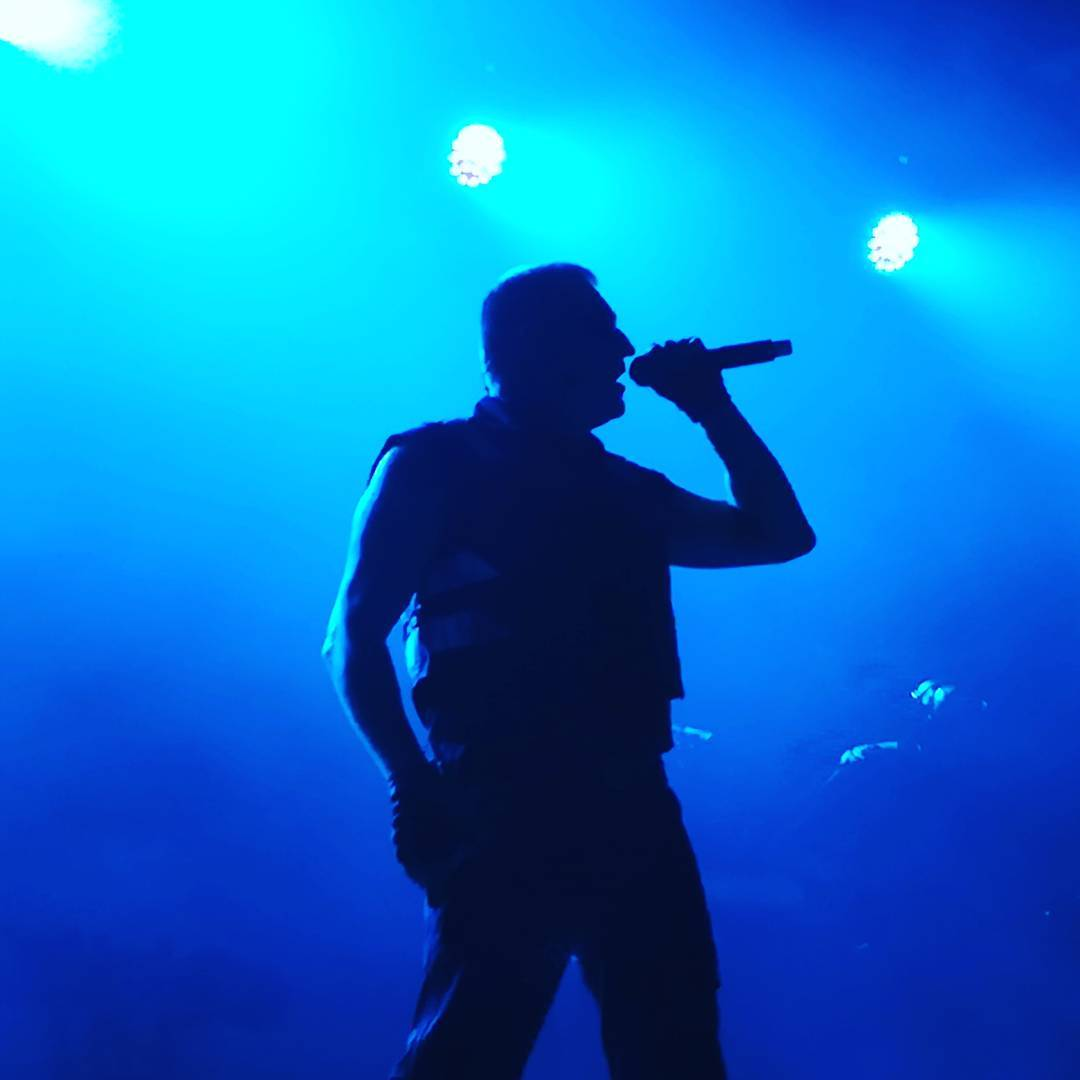
- Jonckheere performing in 2017

Background information
- Also known as: Richard 23; Richard JK
- Born: 20 January 1963 (age 63); Brussels, Belgium
- Genres: Industrial; EBM; techno
- Occupation: Musician
- Instruments: Keyboards; percussion; vocals
- Years active: 1983–present
- Member of: Revolting Cocks; Front 242

Richard Jonckheere (born 20 January 1963), better known by his stage names Richard 23 and Richard JK, is a Belgian musician. He is a member of Front 242 (which he joined in 1983) and was a founding member of Revolting Cocks (which he left in 1986, and later rejoined in 2016). He released the EP Free Tyson Free! with Jean-Pierre Everaerts and Marc Desmare, using the moniker Holy Gang, and two 12-inch singles in 1999/2000 as LaTchak (a collaboration with Everaerts).

== Politics ==
In 2007, Jonckheere ran as a candidate in the Belgian general elections on behalf of the Ecolo party. In the district of Brussels-Halle-Vilvoorde, he finished fifteenth, with 1,936 (or 2.03%) of the votes.
