= Skinny Puppy discography =

Discography of Canadian band

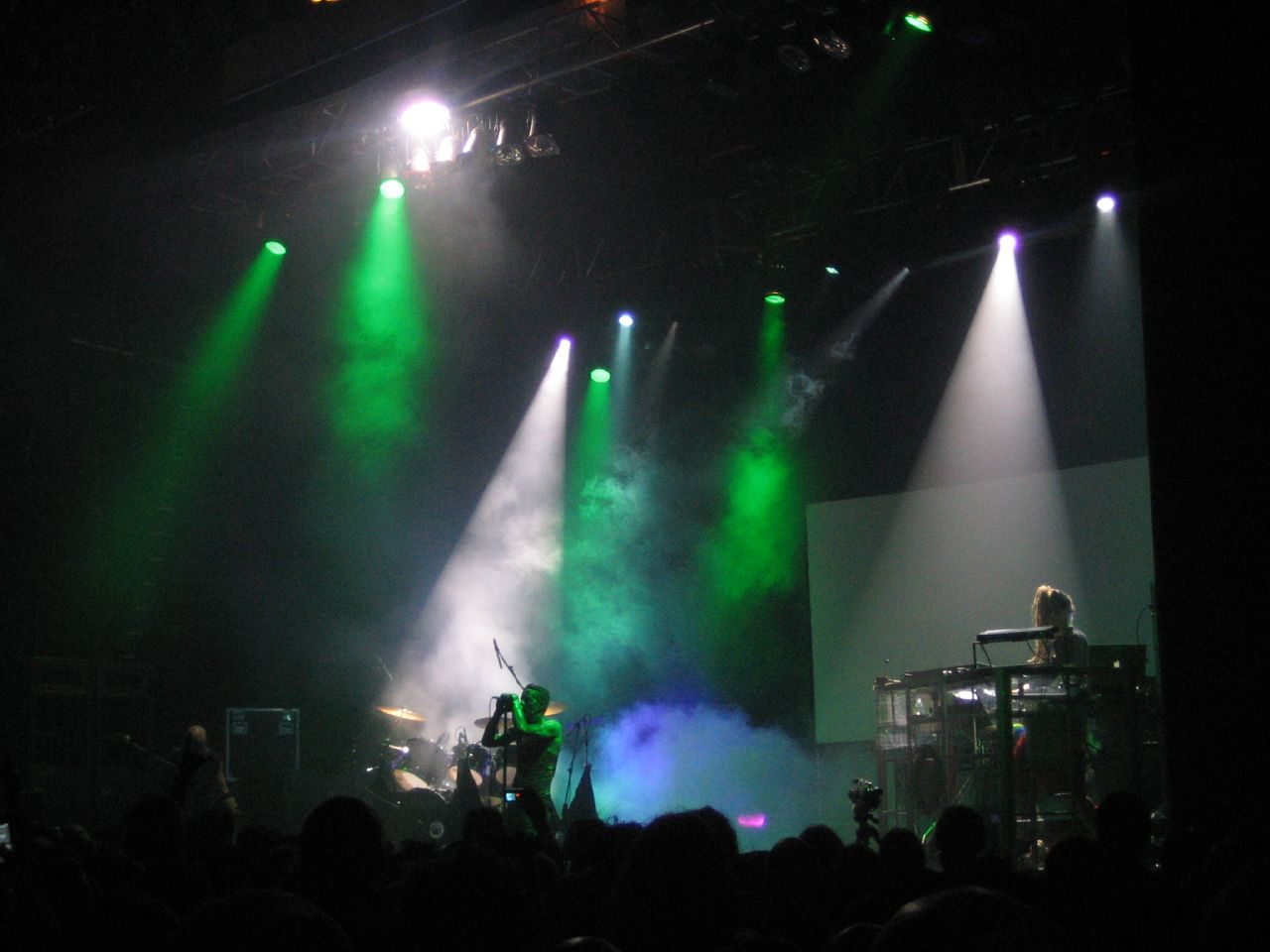
- Studio albums: 12
- Extended plays: 2
- Live albums: 4
- Compilation albums: 11
- Singles: 14
- Video albums: 3
- Music videos: 10

The Canadian electro-industrial band Skinny Puppy has released twelve studio albums and two extended plays along with a number of live albums, compilations, and singles. The group formed in 1982 and released its debut EP, Back & Forth, in 1984. Later that year, Skinny Puppy was picked up by Nettwerk and released another EP, Remission, in December 1984. The band's first studio album, 1985's Bites, was its last with the original lineup of vocalist Nivek Ogre and producer / multi-instrumentalist cEvin Key; Dwayne Goettel joined in 1986, and the band released its next two albums, Mind: The Perpetual Intercourse and Cleanse Fold and Manipulate, in 1986 and 1987 respectively.

VIVIsectVI (1988), Skinny Puppy's fourth album, was one of the band's most well-received efforts, placing on Melody Maker's best of 1988 list and garnering several retrospective accolades. Bradley Torreano of AllMusic hailed the album as a masterpiece, and Jim Harper of the same publication saw VIVIsectVI as the beginning of electro-industrial music. Rabies followed VIVIsectVI in 1989 and marked the band experimenting with industrial metal thanks to the influence of Ministry frontman Al Jourgensen. Key and Goettel expressed dissatisfaction with the album, and Skinny Puppy quickly returned to the studio for its sixth album, 1990's Too Dark Park.

Too Dark Park was another critical highlight of the band's career, and Key described it as a return to form for Skinny Puppy. In 1992, with the band on the brink of dissolution due to Ogre's worsening drug addiction, Last Rights was released and saw the band pushing further into extreme noise territory. The making of Skinny Puppy's next and eighth album, The Process (which would eventually be released in 1996), was fraught with difficulties both internal and external; the band shifted to a new record label with a new recording studio and new producers, Ogre left, Goettel died of a heroin overdose, and the band ultimately dissolved with the album unfinished. Following dissolution, Skinny Puppy released several compilations and a live improvisation album titled Puppy Gristle (which had been recorded in 1993). Ogre and Key reunited in 2000 and a year later released a live album documenting Skinny Puppy's revival. The band returned to the studio and released The Greater Wrong of the Right in 2004, Mythmaker in 2007, HanDover in 2011, and Weapon in 2013.

== Albums ==
=== Studio albums ===
Title	Album details	Peak chart positions								Notes
Title	Album details	US	US Heat	US Taste	US Indie	US Dance	CAN	SWE	GER Alt	Notes
Bites	Released: August 1985; Label: Nettwerk, Play It Again Sam; Format: LP, CD, cassette	—	—	—	—	—	—	—	—	Reissued in 1993 with eight bonus tracks; Certified gold in Canada in 1994
Mind: The Perpetual Intercourse	Released: September 5, 1986; Label: Nettwerk, Play It Again Sam; Format: LP, CD, cassette	—	—	—	—	—	—	—	—	First Skinny Puppy album to feature Dwayne Goettel
Cleanse Fold and Manipulate	Released: June 25, 1987; Label: Nettwerk; Format: LP, CD, cassette	—	—	—	—	—	—	55	—	The end of the last track segues into the beginning of the first track, forming a loop
VIVIsectVI	Released: September 12, 1988; Label: Nettwerk; Format: LP, CD, cassette	—	—	—	—	—	94	—	—	Only Skinny Puppy album to credit Dave Ogilvie as a full member of the band
Rabies	Released: November 20, 1989; Label: Nettwerk; Format: LP, CD, cassette	—	—	—	—	—	88	—	—	Produced in part by Al Jourgensen of industrial metal band Ministry
Too Dark Park	Released: October 30, 1990; Label: Nettwerk; Format: LP, CD, cassette	—	—	—	—	—	—	—	—	Regarded by the band as a return to form after the musical departure of Rabies
Last Rights	Released: March 1992; Label: Nettwerk; Format: LP, CD, cassette	193	10	—	—	—	—	—	—	Much of the album features extended instrumental passages due to Nivek Ogre's drug addiction preventing him from producing complete vocals
The Process	Released: February 27, 1996; Label: American, Warner Bros.; Format: CD, cassette	102	1	—	—	—	30	48	—	Last Skinny Puppy album to feature contributions from Goettel (died in 1995)
The Greater Wrong of the Right	Released: May 25, 2004; Label: Synthetic Symphony; Format: CD	176	7	—	9	—	—	—	1	Skinny Puppy's first reunion album after dissolving in 1995
Mythmaker	Released: January 30, 2007; Label: Synthetic Symphony; Format: CD, LP	200	4	12	17	5	—	—	—	Vinyl issues included three bonus tracks
Handover	Released: October 25, 2011; Label: SPV GmbH; Format: CD	168	3	18	37	9	—	—	—	Experienced the longest recording period of any Skinny Puppy album
Weapon	Released: May 28, 2013; Label: Metropolis; Format: CD, LP	140	2	24	21	4	—	60	1	Based on the band learning that its music had been used for torturing prisoners in Guantanamo Bay; Originally intended to be released with a manual detailing how to use the music to torture people
"—" denotes a title that did not chart or was not released in that territory.

=== Extended plays ===
Title	EP details	Notes
Back & Forth	Released: 1984; Label: self-released; Format: cassette	Skinny Puppy's first release; Remastered, expanded, and reissued in 1992 as Back and Forth Series Two
Remission	Released: December 1984; Label: Nettwerk; Format: LP, CD, cassette	Reissued in 1985 and 1993 with five bonus tracks, retroactively expanding it to the length of a studio album; Certified gold in Canada in 2000

=== Compilation albums ===
Title	Album details	Notes
Bites and Remission	Released: 1987; Label: Nettwerk; Format: CD	Mixes the track listings of various Remission and Bites issues and substitutes two songs for remixes
Remission & Bites	Released: 1987; Label: Play It Again Sam; Format: CD	Preserves Remission and Bites releases in their original forms
Twelve Inch Anthology	Released: 1989; Label: Nettwerk; Format: LP, CD, cassette	Compiles most of Skinny Puppy's 12-inch singles (along with their B-sides) up to 1989
Back and Forth Series Two	Released: October 13, 1992; Label: Nettwerk; Format: CD	A remastered, expanded, and reissued version of Skinny Puppy's debut EP, Back & Forth
Brap: Back and Forth Series 3 & 4	Released: April 30, 1996; Label: Nettwerk, EMI; Format: CD	First disc comprises mostly instrumental demos from 1983 and 1984 while the second comprises mostly live recordings from 1990; Charted on Billboard's Top Heatseekers at 39
Skinned	Released: 1998; Label: Time + Space; Format: CD	Compiles many of the samples employed in Skinny Puppy's music
The Singles Collect	Released: November 16, 1999; Label: Nettwerk; Format: CD	Compiles the band's singles up to and through 1992's Last Rights alongside a few tracks that were not released individually
B-Sides Collect	Released: November 16, 1999; Label: Nettwerk; Format: CD	Compiles many of the B-sides from Skinny Puppy's singles
Back and Forth 06Six	Released: 2003; Label: Subconscious Communications; Format: CD	Compiles early (1982–85) Skinny Puppy improvisations, live recordings, and demos as well as unreleased material from The Process (1996)
Back & Forth Vol7	Released: May 2007; Label: Subconscious Communications; Format: CD	Compiles unreleased material from the Last Rights and The Process eras (1991–95)

=== Live albums ===
Title	Album details	Peak chart positions		Notes
Title	Album details	US Heat	GER	Notes
Ain't It Dead Yet?	Released: 1989; Label: Nettwerk; Formats: VHS, DVD, CD, cassette	—	—	Recorded on May 31, 1987 at Toronto Concert Hall
Doomsday (Back and Forth 5)	Released: August 21, 2001; Label: Nettwerk; Formats: CD	—	15	Recorded on August 20, 2000 at Doomsday Festival; Skinny Puppy's first reunion concert after dissolving in 1995
The Greater Wrong of the Right Live	Released: September 27, 2005; Label: Nettwerk; Formats: DVD	—	—	Recorded over two nights (November 9 and 11, 2004) in Montreal and Toronto; The second disc includes a documentary on the Iraq War titled Information Warfare (directed by William Morrison) as well as archival live footage from 1988, 1990, and 1992
Bootlegged, Broke and in Solvent Seas	Released: June 12, 2012; Label: Metropolis; Formats: CD	46	2	Recorded over several dates on a 2010 tour of Europe
"—" denotes a title that did not chart or was not released in that territory.

== Other releases ==
Title	Album details	Notes
Video Collection (1984–1992)	Released: 1996; Label: Nettwerk; Format: VHS, DVD	Compiles Skinny Puppy's music videos up to and through 1992
Remix Dystemper	Released: October 20, 1998; Label: Nettwerk; Format: CD	A remix album featuring remixes from many industrial and electronic artists
Puppy Gristle	Released: February 2002; Label: Subconscious Communications; Format: CD	A recording of an improvised jam session from November, 1993 featuring members of Skinny Puppy alongside Genesis P-Orridge of Throbbing Gristle and Larry Thrasher of Psychic TV

== Singles ==
Title	Year	Album	Notes
"Dig It"	1986	Mind: The Perpetual Intercourse	—N/a
"Addiction"	1987	Cleanse Fold and Manipulate	—N/a
"Chainsaw"	1987	Non-album single	—N/a
"Stairs and Flowers"	1987	Mind: The Perpetual Intercourse	—N/a
"Censor"	1988	VIVIsectVI	Single for the song "Dogshit", censored for marketability
"Testure"	1989	VIVIsectVI	Charted on Billboards's Dance Club Songs at 19
"Tin Omen"	1989	Rabies	—N/a
"Worlock"	1990	Rabies	—N/a
"Tormentor"	1990	Too Dark Park	—N/a
"Spasmolytic"	1991	Too Dark Park	—N/a
"Inquisition"	1992	Last Rights	—N/a
"Candle"	1996	The Process	—N/a
"Track 10"	2000	Last Rights	—N/a
"Politikil"	2007	Mythmaker	—N/a
"Salvo"	2013	Weapon	Track title stylized as "saLvo"; Released ahead of Weapon as a streamed single
"Illisit"	2013	Weapon	Track title stylized as "illisiT"; Released as a music video on November 19, 2013
