= B-Sides Collect =

Compilation album by Skinny Puppy
- Released: 16 November 1999
- Recorded: 1987–1992
- Genre: Industrial
- Length: 70:23
- Label: Nettwerk
- Producer: Various

Skinny Puppy chronology
The Singles Collect (1999)	B-Sides Collect (1999)	Doomsday: Back and Forth, Vol. 5: Live in Dresden (2000)

Professional ratings
Review scores
Source	Rating
Allmusic	4/5 stars
Kerrang!	2/5 stars

B-Sides Collect is a compilation album by Canadian electro-industrial band Skinny Puppy, released in 1999. The album serves as a collection of several B-sides from earlier singles that were out of print by the time of the collection's release. With the exception of "Serpents", this release complements one of the band's earlier compilations, Twelve Inch Anthology.

Not all Skinny Puppy B-sides are represented on this release due to time and label restrictions. Other B-sides that had previously been available but do not appear on this release include: "Censor (Extended Mix)", "Tin Omen (Reload)", "Spasmolytic (Remix)", "Walking On Ice (Live)", "Inquisition (Extended Mix)", and "Choralone (Live)".

== Track listing ==
No.	Title	Source	Length
1.	"Addiction" (Second Dose)	Addiction	6:01
2.	"The Second Opinion"	Testure	4:58
3.	"Serpents"	Testure	5:54
4.	"Punk in Park Zoo's"	Censor	2:28
5.	"Yes He Ran"	Censor	6:27
6.	"Cage"	Chainsaw	2:17
7.	"Lahuman8"	Inquisition	4:32
8.	"Mirror Saw" (Dub Mix)	Inquisition	5:33
9.	"Shore Lined Poison" (Remix)	Spasmolytic	4:27
10.	"Harsh Stone White" (Live)	Spasmolytic	4:53
11.	"Tin Omen 1"	Worlock	4:47
12.	"Brak Talk"	Worlock	4:59
13.	"Amputate"	Tin Omen	3:13
14.	"Bark"	Tormentor	4:39
15.	"Nature's Revenge" (Dub)	Tormentor	5:08
Total length:			70:23

== Personnel ==
Skinny Puppy

- Nivek Ogre – vocals
- cEvin Key – synthesizers, guitars, bass guitars, drums
- Dwayne Goettel – synthesizers, sampling

Additional personnel

- Dale Plevin – fretless bass on tracks 9, 16
- Alien Jourgensen – additional guitar on 11, production on 13
- Ken Marshall – mixing on 7, 9, 14, 15
- Adrian Sherwood – production on 1
- Dave Ogilvie – mixing on 9, production on 13
- Greg Reely – mixing on 9
- Marc Ramaer – mixing on 11, 12
