= The Singles Collect =

Compilation album by Skinny Puppy
- Released: 16 November 1999
- Recorded: 1984–1992
- Genre: Industrial
- Length: 73:01
- Label: Nettwerk
- Producer: Various

Skinny Puppy chronology
Remix Dystemper (1998)	The Singles Collect (1999)	B-Sides Collect (1999)

Professional ratings
Review scores
Source	Rating
Allmusic	4.5/5 stars
Kerrang!	3/5 stars

The Singles Collect is a compilation album by Canadian electro-industrial band Skinny Puppy, released in 1999. The release serves as a collection of singles along with a few assorted promotional singles and alternate mixes. The compilation represents all of the singles released by Nettwerk before the band's move to American Recordings and subsequent break-up.

On the rear cover, Track 8 is mistakenly titled "Spamsmolytic" instead of "Spasmolytic".

== Track listing ==
No.	Title	Source	Length
1.	"Testure" (S.F. Mix)	Testure	4:00
2.	"Worlock-ed"	Worlock	6:44
3.	"Dig It" (Short Edit)	Dig It	5:06
4.	"Censor"	Censor	3:58
5.	"Assimilate"	Bites	6:55
6.	"Stairs and Flowers"	Stairs and Flowers	5:17
7.	"Inquisition" (Single Mix)	Inquisition	4:24
8.	"Spasmolytic"	Spasmolytic	3:54
9.	"Tin Omen"	Tin Omen	4:36
10.	"Tormentor"	Tormentor	4:33
11.	"Addiction"	Addiction	6:01
12.	"Deep Down Trauma Hounds"	Cleanse Fold and Manipulate	4:41
13.	"Killing Game"	Last Rights	3:49
14.	"Smothered Hope"	Remission	5:14
15.	"Far Too Frail"	Remission	3:43
Total length:			73:01

== Personnel ==
Skinny Puppy

- Nivek Ogre — vocals
- cEvin Key — synthesizers, guitars, bass guitars, drums
- Dwayne Goettel — synthesizers, sampling

Additional personnel

- Dale Plevin — fretless bass on 1, 8, 10
- Tom Ellard — tapes, samples on 5
- Wilhelm Schroeder — backing voice on 6, bass synth on 15
- Alien Jourgensen — additional guitar on 9
- Rave — live sound, guitar on 4, 8, 12
