= Twelve Inch Anthology =

Compilation album by Skinny Puppy
- Released: June 1990
- Recorded: Various
- Genre: Industrial
- Length: 69:18
- Label: Nettwerk
- Producer: Dave Ogilvie, cEvin Key

Skinny Puppy chronology
| Rabies (1989) | Twelve Inch Anthology (1990) | Too Dark Park (1990) |

Professional ratings
Review scores
| Source | Rating |
|---|---|
| Allmusic | 4.5/5 stars |

Twelve Inch Anthology is a compilation album by Skinny Puppy. It contains most of the band's early singles and B-sides. The CD is currently out of print but still available for download. The cover design is a collage of previous Steven R Gilmore covers.

Another B-side compilation was released in 1999 as B-Sides Collect complementing the tracks found here with the exception of "Serpents".

== Track listing ==
| No. | Title | Source | Length |
|---|---|---|---|
| 1. | "Dig It (12" Version)" | Dig It | 7:28 |
| 2. | "The Choke (Re-Grip)" | Dig It | 6:15 |
| 3. | "Addiction (First Dose)" | Addiction | 8:30 |
| 4. | "Deep Down Trauma Hounds (Remix)" | Addiction | 7:27 |
| 5. | "Serpents" (Some releases misspell the title as "Serpants" or "Serphants") | Testure | 5:57 |
| 6. | "Chainsaw" | Chainsaw | 5:55 |
| 7. | "Assimilate (R23 Remix)" | Chainsaw | 6:34 |
| 8. | "Stairs and Flowers (Def Wish Mix)" | Chainsaw | 6:05 |
| 9. | "Stairs and Flowers (Too Far Gone)" | Chainsaw | 6:37 |
| 10. | "Testure (12" Mix)" | Testure | 8:30 |

- A rare cassette version of the compilation exists that contains the songs "Addiction (Second Dose)" and "Testure (S.F.Mix)".
