= Spasmolytic =

Spasmolytic may refer to:

- Antispasmodic, smooth muscle relaxant
- A type of muscle relaxant
- "Spasmolytic" (song), by Canadian band Skinny Puppy
