= Candle (Skinny Puppy song) =

Song by Skinny Puppy

Single by Skinny Puppy

from the album The Process
- Released: 1996
- Recorded: 1996
- Genre: Industrial
- Length: 4:58
- Label: American
- Songwriters: Martin Atkins, Kevin Crompton, Dwayne Goettel, Dave Ogilvie, Kevin Ogilvie, Patrick Sproule
- Producers: Dave Ogilvie, cEvin Key

Skinny Puppy singles chronology
"Inquisition" (1992)	"Candle" (1996)	"Track 10" (2000)

Candle is a single by the band Skinny Puppy, taken from their 1996 album The Process. The song was atypical of the band's normal output in that it was built around acoustic guitar.

== Track listing ==
No.	Title	Length
1.	"Candle (Edit)"	3:19
2.	"Candle (Album Version)"	4:58

== Personnel ==
- Nivek Ogre (vocals)
- cEvin Key (production, various instruments)
- Dwayne Goettel (various instruments, mixing)
- Dave Ogilvie (production, mixing)
- Ken Marshall (recording, mixing)

== Charts ==
Chart (1996)	Peak position
Canada Rock/Alternative (RPM)	22
