= Rabies (Skinny Puppy album) =

Studio album by Skinny Puppy
- Released: November 21, 1989
- Recorded: 1988–1989
- Studios: Vancouver Studios (Vancouver); Chicago Trax Studios (Chicago)
- Genres: Electro-industrial; industrial metal
- Length: 40:51 (vinyl and cassette versions); 60:54 (CD version)
- Label: Nettwerk
- Producers: David Ogilvie; Alien Jourgensen; cEvin Key

Skinny Puppy chronology
VIVIsectVI (1988)	Rabies (1989)	Too Dark Park (1990)

Singles from Rabies
- 1. "Tin Omen" Released: 1989; 2. "Worlock" Released: 1990

Rabies is the fifth studio album by Skinny Puppy. It was released on November 21, 1989, through Nettwerk. The album notably features Ministry frontman Al Jourgensen (credited as Alien Jourgensen) who performed electric guitar and vocals on several songs. The album spawned two singles, "Tin Omen" and "Worlock", the latter of which becoming one of the band's most recognizable songs. The cover art was made by longtime Skinny Puppy collaborator Steven R. Gilmore. In 1993 the CD edition was reissued by Nettwerk to correct mastering errors in the original release.

Rabies was a commercial success for the band, but received mixed reviews from critics upon release, several of whom drew parallels between the record and Ministry's style, both favorably and unfavorably. A joint tour with Ministry, KMFDM, and My Life with the Thrill Kill Kult, dubbed The Mutants of Rock Tour, was planned but ultimately cancelled when Skinny Puppy ended its commitment to the project.

== Recording and production ==
Most of the band's previous albums had been mixed and produced by the group's "fourth member" Dave "Rave" Ogilvie. For Rabies, lead singer/songwriter Nivek Ogre brought in friend and Ministry frontman, Al Jourgensen. Ogre had met Jourgensen during the recording of the PTP song "Show Me Your Spine" in 1987. Ogre later toured with Ministry (Ogre can be seen and heard on the In Case You Didn't Feel Like Showing Up video and CD) and would also go on to provide vocals for Jourgensen's side project Revolting Cocks. The other two members of Skinny Puppy, cEvin Key (drummer) and Dwayne Goettel (keyboardist/synthesist), did not approve of Jourgensen's takeover, creating a "glacial coldness" between the band members. A couple years following the release of Rabies, Key mentioned to Alternative Press that he believed Jourgensen's motive for assisting in the album's production was to try and break up Skinny Puppy.

Much of the album had been written before Jourgensen was officially involved, though Key has mentioned that the process was influenced by the notion that Jourgensen might join them in the studio to "jam". The group took into consideration what type of music Jourgensen would be interested in making, thus writing guitar heavy material such as "Tin Omen", a song which makes reference to the Tiananmen Square protests of 1989. "Fascist Jock Itch", also written with Jourgensen in mind, was inspired by an incident between Ogre and a few skinheads. Ogre states that he had been approached by the skinheads who then proceeded to question him regarding his "loyalty towards communism" (prompted by a small Red star on his pants). Feeling threatened, Ogre pushed one of them away and a short scuffle ensued. Other songs on the album, such as "Worlock" and "Choralone", have been described as being more "pure" to previous Skinny Puppy material. The song "Hexonxonx", a song which criticizes the use of oil (written in the aftermath of the Exxon Valdez oil spill of 1989), has been described as being an exemplary mixture of "twisted humor and Throbbing Gristle-like experimentation", while other entries from the album have been noted for their novel use of sampling.

The song "Worlock" has been played on every tour after its conception. A Roland Harmonizer was used to create the vocoder-effect during the chorus. Samples of the song "Helter Skelter" by the Beatles are mixed with an excerpt of Charles Manson singing the song; the excerpt comes from the 1973 documentary Manson.

== Release and promotion ==
The original CD release on Nettwerk (and the licensed version on Capitol) was mistakenly mastered with Dolby B noise reduction, which resulted in a muffled sound. In 1993, the album was digitally remastered and re-released on Nettwerk.

Only one promotional video was produced for Rabies. The "Worlock" video was primarily a rhythmically edited string of horror movie clips featuring outtakes and clips from the band's earlier video, "Stairs and Flowers" (from the album Mind: The Perpetual Intercourse). The video, which opens with a "Rated X" graphic, was intended to be a critique of the concept of censorship in America. Many of the movie clips featured in the video were from films made by controversial Italian filmmaker Dario Argento, whose work has a reputation for being heavily censored by US distributors in order to gain "R-Ratings" from the MPAA. For the "Worlock" video Skinny Puppy included footage deleted from the US versions of such Argento films as Deep Red, Suspiria, Tenebrae, Phenomena, and Opera. Other films included in the music video include, The Beyond, Hellbound: Hellraiser II, Bad Taste, Dead and Buried, Luther The Geek, Henry: Portrait of a Serial Killer, From Beyond, Death Warmed Up, Eraserhead and Altered States.

Due to the graphic violence of the horror film clips used in the video, and also copyright violations, "Worlock" was subsequently banned by MTV, and did not receive any television airplay. In 1992, Skinny Puppy released a compilation of their music videos, but "Worlock" was noticeably absent. According to Nettwerk, the video was omitted partially due to copyright problems and also because of concern the video would be banned by other countries which might find the video's content obscene. However, in recent years the video has been widely bootlegged among fans on the Internet. "Backing" videos for "Tin Omen" and "Choralone" were produced for the Too Dark Park tour in 1990, and have also been spread on the Internet.

A limited run of promotional mechanical pencils were made and sent to college (and possibly other) radio stations along with the album. Shaped like a syringe the pencils were white with black lettering "SKINNY [PUPPY]" and white on black lettering "RABIES". They were approximately 4 inches in length.

The Mutants of Rock Tour, which was to include a quadruple bill including Skinny Puppy, Ministry, KMFDM, and My Life with the Thrill Kill Kult, was to begin on December 27, 1989. However, according to Key, the tour was called off when Skinny Puppy collectively decided to pull out, citing concerns regarding the band's then uncertain situation. Key suggested a potential line of shows for the summer of 1990, but expressed little faith in any tour supporting Rabies ever happening. Ogre ultimately joined Ministry's tour for The Mind Is a Terrible Thing to Taste.

== Critical reception ==
Professional ratings
Review scores
Source	Rating
AllMusic	3/5 stars
Sputnikmusic	3/5 stars
Tampa Bay Times	4/5 stars

Since the album's release, reception from both critics and fans has been mixed. Alternative Press said Rabies was more of a Skinny Puppy/Ministry hybrid and was not representative of the group's best work.

Tim DiGravina from AllMusic stated that Rabies was a solid release, even though he felt the band was not performing "at their peak". He goes on to praise the album's implementation of movie dialogue, particularly commending its use in the songs "Worlock", "Tin Omen", and "Rivers". DiGravina was, however, less impressed by Jourgensen's contributions, asserting that the same qualities which made The Mind Is a Terrible Thing to Taste a good album were not suitable for Rabies. Trey Spencer from Sputnikmusic was less favorable, calling the record one of the group's "low points". He was critical of the album's use of simple (and sometimes "formless") song structures and claimed that the sampling brought nothing meaningful to the table. Spencer was more receptive to the song "Worlock", calling it the band's "defining moment", but concludes by saying that "the rest of the album consists of two good Industrial Metal songs, three average songs, and five songs that aren’t worth wasting your time on".

Beth Fertig of The Boston Globe panned the album as "just another festering collection of noise", but pointed out the use of humor on songs such as "Fascist Jock Itch" as a positive element of the band's music. Daniel Lukes of Kerrang! said that despite a "handful of undeniably classic tracks", the album comes across more as a collection of "Ministry B-sides" than a typical Skinny Puppy record.

In a positive review from the Los Angeles Times, writers Jonathan Gold and David Kendrick list Rabies as an essential industrial album, calling it a "slightly atypical" offering that "also rocks a little harder". This sentiment was echoed by CMJ's Brad Filicky, who called the album "a masterpiece of the industrial genre". Jean Carey of the Tampa Bay Times praised the album, calling attention to the use of sampling, the song "Worlock", and Ogre's vocal work, which was compared to a "crazed Jimmy Durante". Carey concluded by saying that "Skinny Puppy's willingness to experiment and change makes [Rabies] well worth a listen". Mark Jenkins of The Washington Post thought the album was less theatrical than their previous efforts, but concluded that the album's "groove is as solid as any the Puppy has ever fetched".

== Track listing ==
All tracks are written by Skinny Puppy.

No.	Title	Sample(s)	Length
1.	"Rodent"		5:48
2.	"Hexonxonx"	Contains samples of: The Dungeonmaster (1984) by David W. Allen; The Occult Experience (1985) by Frank Heimans; Prison (1987) by Renny Harlin; Jimmy Swaggart's apology sermon (1988)	5:24
3.	"Two Time Grime"		5:38
4.	"Fascist Jock Itch"	Contains samples of: The Devils (1971) by Ken Russell; Scanners (1981) by David Cronenberg; Hellraiser (1987) by Clive Barker	4:58
5.	"Worlock"	Contains samples of: Manson (1973) by Robert Hendrickson and Laurence Merrick	5:30
6.	"Rain"		1:26
7.	"Tin Omen"	Contains samples of: "Keeper of the Purple Twilight" (1964) from The Outer Limits by Charles F. Haas	4:36
8.	"Rivers"	Contains samples of: 2001: A Space Odyssey (1968) by Stanley Kubrick; A Clockwork Orange (1971) by Stanley Kubrick; The House by the Cemetery (1981) by Lucio Fulci; Dead & Buried (1981) by Gary Sherman; Maniac 2: Mr. Robbie (1986) by Buddy Giovinazzo; The Fearless Vampire Killers (1967) by Roman Polanski & Gérard Brach	4:48
9.	"Choralone"		2:43
Total length:			40:51

CD-only bonus tracks
No.	Title	Length
10.	"Amputate"	3:40
11.	"Spahn Dirge"	16:23
Total length:		60:54

== Personnel ==
- Nivek Ogre (vocals, production, engineering, mixing, various instruments)
- cEvin Key (production, engineering, mixing, various instruments)
- Dwayne Goettel (production, engineering, mixing, various instruments)
- Dave Ogilvie (production, engineering, mixing, backing vocals)
- Al Jourgensen (production, engineering, mixing, guitar, additional vocals)
- Greg Reely (additional engineering, special thanks)
- Marc Ramaer (additional engineering, mixing)
- Ken Marshall (additional engineering)
- Cyan Meeks (vocals and lyrics on "Rain")
- Keith Auerbach (mixing on "Fascist Jock Itch")
- Jeff Newell (mixing on "Fascist Jock Itch")

== Chart positions ==
Chart (1996)	Peak position
Canada Top Albums/CDs (RPM)	88
