= Inquisition (song) =

Song by Skinny Puppy

Single by Skinny Puppy

from the album Last Rights
- Released: March 24, 1992
- Genre: Electro-industrial
- Length: 21:36
- Label: Nettwerk; Capitol
- Songwriter(s): Skinny Puppy
- Producer(s): Dave Ogilvie; cEvin Key

Skinny Puppy singles chronology
"Spasmolytic" (1991)	"Inquisition" (1992)	"Candle" (1996)

Alternate cover
- Capitol Records cover

Professional ratings
Review scores
Source	Rating
AllMusic	2.5/5 stars

"Inquisition" is a song by Canadian electro-industrial band Skinny Puppy. It was released as a single on March 24, 1992 in advance of its host album, Last Rights (1992). The B-side "Lahuman8" was created at the request of the Québécois contemporary dance group La La La Human Steps.

== Content ==
=== The song ===
"Inquisition" acts as the midpoint of Skinny Puppy's 1992 album Last Rights. Even though it is a pounding, aggressive, mechanical industrial dance song that John Bush of AllMusic described as "heart-stopping" and as the pinnacle of its album, it still functions as a break from the surrounding chaos and sorrow of Last Rights. Jon Selzer of Melody Maker wrote that the song has the "utopian laments" that made defined Skinny Puppy's best work. Originally bearing the demo title "Catbowl", "Inquisition" takes a break from the addiction-focused lyrics of the rest of Last Rights and returns to the topic of torture and animal cruelty that the band explored on its 1988 album, VIVIsectVI. Like many other Skinny Puppy songs, "Inquisition" employs samples.

"Inquisition"
"Inquisition's" beginning showcases its danceable aggression.

=== The single ===
Three version of "Inquisition" exist, two of which appear on its single release. The extended mix lengthens the song from five minutes to seven and begins with a brief atmospheric introduction. The many layers of the track are introduced one by one, and its first third features two rhythmic stops not found on the album version. After the first chorus, a percussion breakdown is followed by a period of synthesizer emphasis. The extended mix contains multiple protracted instrumental segments where the various parts are given more time to develop. Notably, the passages of high-speed bass drums are completely absent in this version, with the song instead winding down through gradually stripping away electronic layers. The single mix of "Inquisition", which also appears on the 1999 compilation The Singles Collect, shortens the song's introduction and removes many (but not all) of the kick drum segments in its latter half.

"Lahuman8" was commissioned by the Canadian dance group La La La Human Steps after Skinny Puppy released its sixth album, Too Dark Park, in 1990. Fellow industrial band Einstürzende Neubauten was also recruited for the effort. The song itself is a dark, synthesizer-heavy piece with distant, distorted vocals and an unsettling tone. It concludes with a rising wall of noise. "Lahuman8" also appeared on Skinny Puppy's 1999 compilation B-Sides Collect. After viewing the performance in which the dance group employed "Lahuman8", Lewis Segal of the Los Angeles Times described the show's musical compositions as "assaultive".

The dub mix of "Mirror Saw" is a stripped down version of the original song with a greater focus on its percussion and percussive samples. It is a minimal, instrumental track that eschews much of the album version's melancholy peacefulness in exchange for sparse and mechanical aggression. The last third of the song introduces loud live drumming that drowns out many of the electronic sounds.

== Track listing ==
No.	Title	Length
1.	"Inquisition" (Single mix)	4:26
2.	"Inquisition" (Extended)	7:05
3.	"Lahuman8"	4:32
4.	"Mirror Saw" (Dub mix)	5:32
Total length:		21:36

== Personnel ==
Credits adapted from liner notes.

Skinny Puppy

- Nivek Ogre – vocals
- cEvin Key – synthesizers, programming, engineering
- Dwayne Goettel – synthesizers, programming, engineering

Additional personnel

- Dave Ogilvie – production, editing
- Anthony Valcic – editing
- Ken Marshall – mixing, recording
- Jim Cummins – artwork
- John Rummen – layout
