= Mind: The Perpetual Intercourse =

Studio album by Skinny Puppy
- Released: September 5, 1986 (US release date November 1986)
- Recorded: 1986
- Genres: Industrial; electro-industrial
- Length: 43:18
- Labels: Nettwerk (Canada, U.S.); Play It Again Sam (Europe)
- Producers: Dave Ogilvie; cEvin Key

Skinny Puppy chronology
Bites (1985)	Mind: The Perpetual Intercourse (1986)	Cleanse Fold and Manipulate (1987)

Singles from Mind: The Perpetual Intercourse
- 1. "Dig It" Released: 1986; 2. "Chainsaw" Released: 1987; 3. "Stairs and Flowers" Released: 1987

Mind: The Perpetual Intercourse is the second studio album by Skinny Puppy, released on September 5, 1986. It contained the single "Dig It", which inspired several industrial music contemporaries, including Nine Inch Nails. "Dig It" received extensive airplay on MTV and was listed by Billboard as a recommended dance track. The song "Stairs and Flowers" was also released as a single.

The cover photo, taken by Steven R. Gilmore, was from a pornographic film that happened to come on the TV in a hotel in New York City. The cover caused Tipper Gore to place it on one of her lists for the Parents Music Resource Center as an example of why there should be parental advisory stickers on albums.

== Overview ==
When it became clear to band leader cEvin Key that Bill Leeb was uninterested in staying with Skinny Puppy, he hired Dwayne Goettel. The two had met when Goettel's band, Water, opened for a Skinny Puppy show in 1985. Key and Goettel got on well and quickly began jamming together. Goettel was a classically trained pianist and had extensive technical knowledge, including experience with the Ensoniq Mirage which became vital to Skinny Puppy's sound. The inclusion of Goettel helped the band to escape their synth-pop roots and take on a more industrial sound.

The album was the first new Skinny Puppy release to be overseen by Capitol Records. The band's deal with Capitol dramatically increased the number of stores their records were sold in, from 200 to 1,700 across Canada. The release of their first single, "Dig It", also bolstered the band's image in America, where the song's music video was played regularly on MTV. The album's artwork was created by frequent collaborator Steven R. Gilmore, who used an image he had snapped of a porn actress he saw writhing on TV. The cover won the award for Best Album Art at the 1987 CASBY Awards.

Coinciding with the release of the album, the band embarked on a 66-date tour of North America and Europe alongside Australian act Severed Heads. During the tour, singer Nivek Ogre said that he dedicated the album to "those who make up their own minds", going on that he hoped the imagery employed on stage would not shock people, but make them think. The Royal Winnipeg Ballet used Skinny Puppy's music for portions of its show during their 1986 tour.

== Critical reception ==
Professional ratings
Review scores
Source	Rating
AllMusic	3/5 stars
Orlando Sentinel	3/5 stars

Tim DiGravina of AllMusic awarded the album three out of five stars and said that it did not represent the band at their best, but served as a prelude to the "chaotic future masterworks". Erine Welch of The Boston Globe wrote that the album had intrigue, but was generally too unintelligible to understand. "Provocative? Disturbing? Ridiculous? Skinny Puppy is probably all three. Is Skinny Puppy worth taking home for a listen? Let me put it this way: I'll be reimbursed for my copy". Billboard magazine recommended the album, but said that it had little chance of exposure outside of college radio.

Bill Henderson of the Orlando Sentinel said that the album was "void of human feeling or emotion", but shined with its use of synthesizers and samples. Diana Valois from The Morning Call neither recommended or rejected the album, saying that it was "thoughtfully engineered - like a toxic dump reclamation project". Frances Litman of the Times Colonist panned the album, apologizing to Skinny Puppy fans before saying "how this noise can be classified as music is beyond me".

In 1987, Melody Maker named the album the 11th best album of the year, describing the album as a "desolate, crackling chunk of rust encrusted machinery tacked with bolts, deflecting radio waves and colliding with lost junk".

== Track listing ==
All tracks are written by Ogre/Key.

No.	Title	Sample(s)	Length
1.	"One Time One Place"		5:41
2.	"God's Gift (Maggot)"		4:46
3.	"Three Blind Mice"		3:08
4.	"Love"	Contains samples of: The Legend of Hell House (1973) by John Hough	1:43
5.	"Stairs and Flowers"	Contains samples of: Sticks audio drama by ZBS Media; The Cabinet of Dr. Fritz (1984) by ZBS Media	5:17
6.	"Antagonism"		5:03
7.	"200 Years"	Contains samples of: "Elegy" (1960) from The Twilight Zone by Douglas Heyes	4:45
8.	"Dig It"	Contains samples of: "Elegy" (1960) from The Twilight Zone by Douglas Heyes	6:03
9.	"Burnt with Water"	Contains samples of: The Exorcist (1973) by William Friedkin; Halloween III: Season of the Witch (1982) by Tommy Lee Wallace	7:41
Total length:			43:18

1988 CD reissue bonus tracks
No.	Title	Sample(s)	Length
10.	"Chainsaw"	Contains samples of: "Elegy" (1960) from The Twilight Zone by Douglas Heyes; Marathon Man (1976) by John Schlesinger	5:55
11.	"Addiction" (Second Dose)		6:01
12.	"Stairs and Flowers" (Too Far Gone)		6:35
13.	"Deep Down Trauma Hounds" (Remix)	Contains samples of: Perry Mason (1957–1966) by Gail Patrick; Water, Water Every Hare (1952) by Charles M. Jones; KSTW-11 television station	7:32
Total length:			70:10

Notes

- "Dig It" is replaced by its 12" version on the CD; it lasts 7:24. On vinyl, "Burnt with Water" ends with a locked groove repeating the phrase "Amen, Lord, hear my prayer" endlessly until the needle is lifted.
- Several of the CD-only bonus tracks were mislabeled, either as "(Dub)" or with no version mentioned.

== Personnel ==
Personnel adapted from liner notes.

- Nivek Ogre – vocals, keyboards, synthesizers, lyrics
- cEvin Key – drums, percussion, keyboards, synthesizers, bass guitar, electric guitar, production, engineering, mixing
- Dave Ogilvie – production, engineering, mixing
- Dwayne Goettel – keyboards, synthesizers, sampler, bass guitar
- Wilhelm Schroeder – backing vocals on "Stairs and Flowers"
- David Jackson – chainsaw on "Chainsaw"
