= Remix Dystemper =

Remix album by Skinny Puppy
- Released: 20 October 1998
- Genre: Industrial
- Length: 1:14:42
- Label: Nettwerk
- Producer: Various

Skinny Puppy chronology
The Process (1996)	Remix Dystemper (1998)	The Singles Collect (1999)

Professional ratings
Review scores
Source	Rating
Allmusic	3/5 stars

Remix Dystemper is a 1998 remix album of Skinny Puppy tracks, by various artists. An early pressing of the Remix DysTemper album shipped with all the proper artwork, but the disc contained Christian gospel music instead of the Skinny Puppy remixes. A promo version of the album contained only eight tracks, omitting tracks 3, 4, 10, 11, 12.

Both the "Rodent" remix by Hiwatt and the "Spasmolytic" remix by Deftones appeared on different soundtracks of the famous Saw franchise. "Rodent" appeared on the soundtrack for Saw II while "Spasmolytic" appeared on the soundtrack for Saw IV. The Hiwatt remix of "Rodent" appeared in the video game LittleBigPlanet 3.

== Track listing ==
No.	Title	Length
1.	"Rodent (Ken "hiwatt" Marshall Remix) (DDT Mix)"	7:12
2.	"Addiction (Günter Schulz of KMFDM Remix) (Opium Remix)"	6:35
3.	"Smothered Hope (Ogre and Mark Walk Remix)"	3:33
4.	"Killing Game (Autechre Remix) (Bent Mix)"	5:11
5.	"Love in Vein (Neotropic Remix) (Go Girl Trio Mix)"	5:11
6.	"Worlock (Rhys Fulber Remix) (Eye of the Beholder Mix)"	6:50
7.	"Spasmolytic (Deftones Remix) (Habitual Mix)"	4:32
8.	"Tin Omen (Adrian Sherwood Remix) (Main Mix)"	7:32
9.	"Testure (God Lives Underwater Remix)"	5:16
10.	"Dig It (Mark Walk Remix)"	2:44
11.	"Assimilate (Chris Vrenna Remix) (Tweaker Mix)"	6:22
12.	"Censor (Guru Remix) (The Gutter Mix)"	4:04
13.	"Chainsaw (Josh Wink Remix)"	9:39
