= Skinny Puppy =

Canadian industrial band

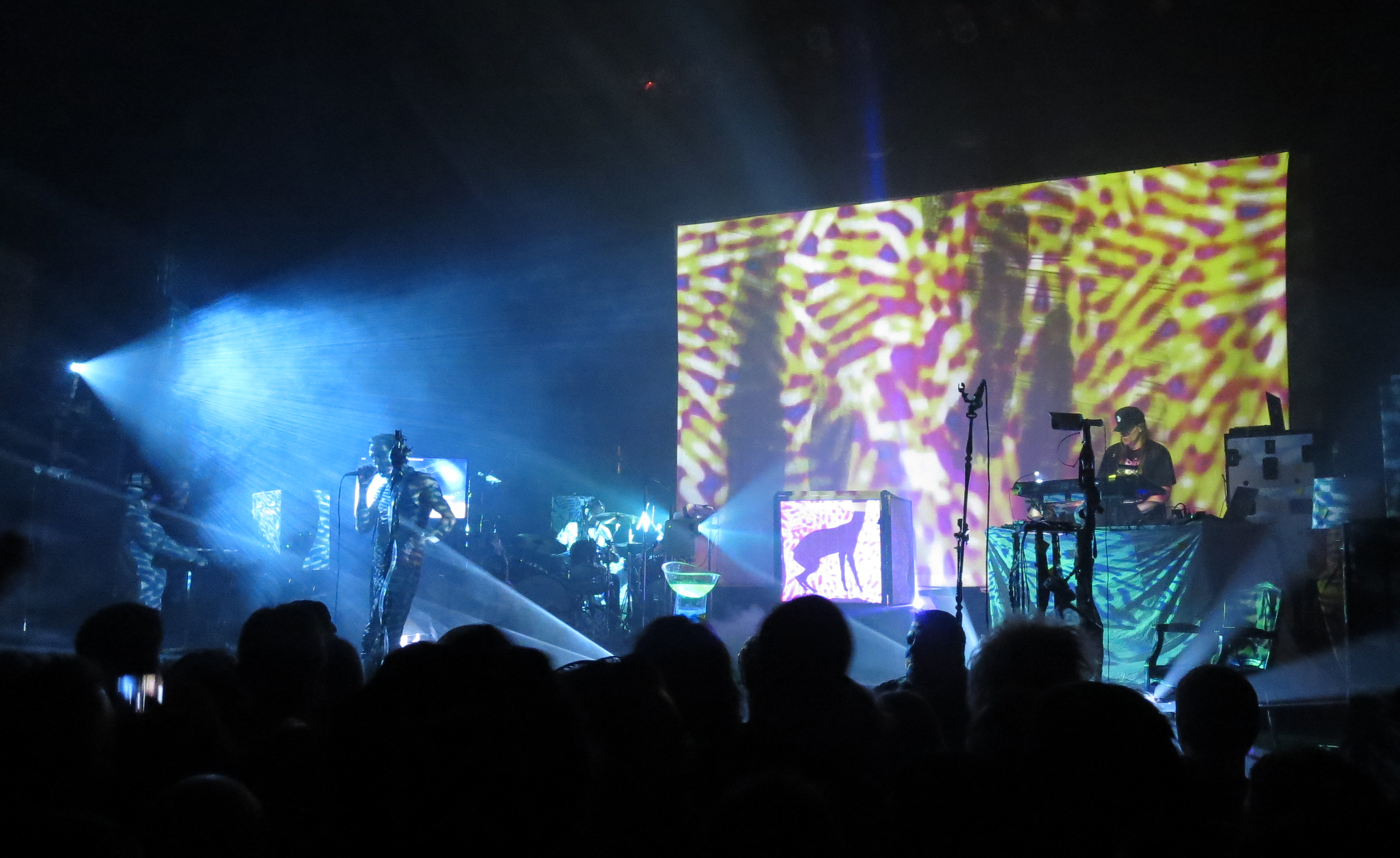
- Skinny Puppy live at The Vic Theatre in 2014

Background information
- Origin: Vancouver, British Columbia, Canada
- Genres: Industrial; electro-industrial; industrial rock; EBM
- Years active: 1982–1996; 2000; 2003–2023
- Labels: Metropolis; Subconscious Communications; Synthetic Symphony; Nettwerk; Capitol/EMI; American Recordings; Play It Again Sam
- Past members: cEvin Key; Nivek Ogre; Bill Leeb; Dwayne Goettel; Dave "Rave" Ogilvie; Mark Walk
- Website: skinnypuppy.com

Skinny Puppy was a Canadian electro-industrial band formed in Vancouver in 1982. The musical group was considered one of the founding groups of the industrial rock and electro-industrial musical genres.

Initially envisioned as an experimental side-project by cEvin Key (Kevin Crompton) while he was in the new wave band Images in Vogue, Skinny Puppy evolved into a full-time project with the addition of vocalist Nivek Ogre (Kevin Ogilvie). Over the course of 13 studio albums and many live tours, Key and Ogre were the only constant members.

Other members of Skinny Puppy over the years have included Dwayne Goettel (1986–1995; died in 1995), Dave "Rave" Ogilvie (1987–1988, although he was a long-time associate and producer from 1984 to 1996; not a relative of Kevin Ogilvie), Bill Leeb (1984–1986; he went under the pseudonym Wilhelm Schroeder), Mark Walk (2003–2023). Many guest musicians have also performed with Skinny Puppy, including Al Jourgensen (1989) and Danny Carey (2004).

After the self-release of their first cassette demo in 1984, Skinny Puppy soon signed to Vancouver label Nettwerk, anchoring its early roster. From their Nettwerk debut EP Remission in 1984 to their 1992 album Last Rights, Skinny Puppy developed into an influential band with a dedicated cult following, fusing elements of industrial, funk, noise, new wave, electro, and rock music and making innovative use of sampling. Over the course of several tours of North America and Europe in this period, they became known for theatrical, horror-themed live performances and videos, drawing attention to issues such as chemical warfare and animal testing.

In 1993, Skinny Puppy left Nettwerk and long-time producer Rave, signing with American Recordings and relocating to Malibu, California, where drug problems and tension between band members plagued the recording of their next album, The Process (1996).

Ogre quit Skinny Puppy in June 1995, and Goettel died of a heroin overdose two months later. Key and Ogre, already active in a number of other projects, went their separate ways, reuniting for a one-off Skinny Puppy concert at the Doomsday Festival in Dresden, Germany, in 2000.

Reforming Skinny Puppy in 2003 with producer Mark Walk, they released their ninth album, The Greater Wrong of the Right (2004), which was followed by the release of the albums Mythmaker (2007) and HanDover (2011). In 2013, they released the album Weapon, which was inspired by allegations that their music had been used for torture in the Guantanamo Bay detention camp.

== History ==
=== Formation and first releases (1982–1985) ===
Skinny Puppy formed in 1982 as a side project for Kevin Crompton in Vancouver, British Columbia. Crompton was dissatisfied with the pop direction of the band he was in, Images in Vogue, and began Skinny Puppy with the intention of doing something more compelling and experimental. Images in Vogue had become a popular act in Vancouver, achieving several radio hits and opening for groups such as Duran Duran, Depeche Mode, and Roxy Music. Crompton had planned Skinny Puppy to be a side project while he continued his work in Images in Vogue; however, when Images in Vogue relocated to Toronto, Crompton made Skinny Puppy his full-time project. Crompton had already created the name for the project and recorded several songs when he asked Kevin Graham Ogilvie to join. Ogilvie had been a roommate of Images in Vogue member Gary Blair Smith and had met Crompton at a party in late 1982. To avoid the confusion of having two people named Kevin in one band, the pair created stage names, with Crompton becoming cEvin Key and Ogilvie becoming Nivek Ogre.

Using Key's apartment as a studio, the duo began recording songs and in 1983 with the help of Images in Vogue recording engineer Dave "Rave" Ogilvie (no relation to Ogre), Skinny Puppy released the EP Back & Forth. This was the beginning of a long partnership between Skinny Puppy and Rave, who would serve as their producer until 1993, and again in 1995, and was occasionally listed as a member of the band in album liner notes. Though only 35 copies were ever printed, the self-released Back & Forth drew the attention of Vancouver startup label Nettwerk, who signed the band later that year. The first live Skinny Puppy show was held at the Unovis art gallery in Vancouver in February 1984; the British group Alien Sex Fiend were among the 300 people in attendance.

"Assimilate"
Assimilate went on to become one of the most popular Skinny Puppy songs. This track is from Bites.

Ogre has said that Skinny Puppy acted as an escape for Key, who wished to distance himself from Images in Vogue: "He was looking for something to break out of [Images in Vogue], and maybe I was it". Key would continue to drum for Images in Vogue until the group relocated to Toronto in 1985. Key's concept behind Skinny Puppy came from the group's first song ever recorded, "K-9". The idea, according to Key, was to create music which explored "life as seen through a dog's eyes". Skinny Puppy also incorporated the use of "B-grade horror movie visuals", including fake blood and props, into their live performances. Key justified these "shock gore" antics with the following:

What we're presenting isn't much different from what [the audience] is subjected to in everyday life. For example, a commercial is a very plastic view of existence and reality. When you watch a TV show and see a world with picture-perfect endings, all you have to do is switch the station and watch the news.

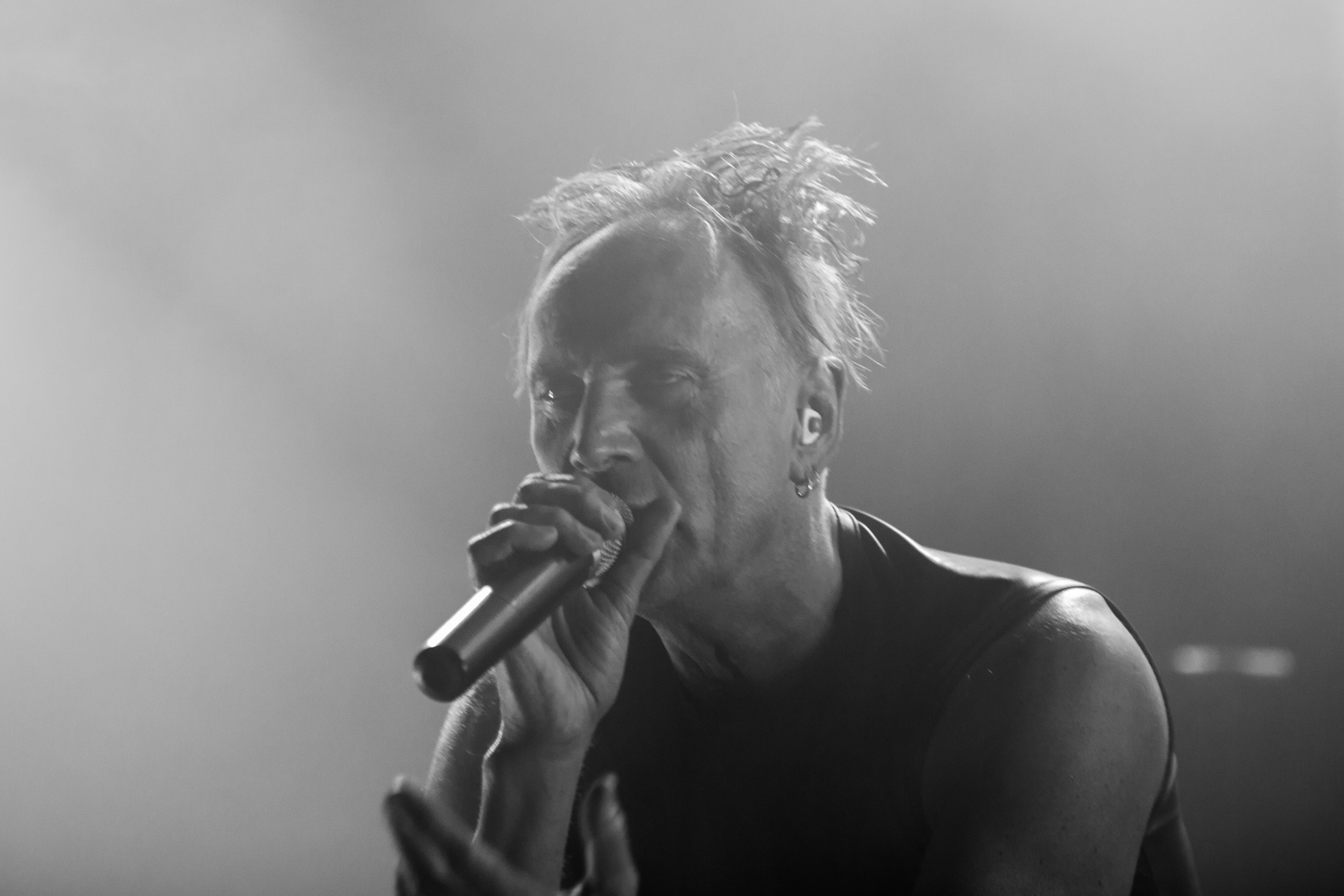
Bill Leeb contributed to several early Skinny Puppy recordings

Having scored a record deal with Nettwerk and with interest surrounding the Back & Forth EP growing, Skinny Puppy was invited to Vancouver's Mushroom Studios to work on new material. It was here that the group recruited Bill Leeb to perform bass synth and backing vocals. Like Ogre and Key before him, Leeb created a stage name, Wilhelm Schroeder; "my real name is Wilhelm" said Leeb, "Schroeder we picked out from the guy playing the piano in the Charlie Brown cartoon". Skinny Puppy released their second EP, Remission in December 1984, almost a year following Back & Forth.

Remission marked the first time Skinny Puppy would collaborate with artist Steven Gilmore, who created the album artwork. The EP was initially only released in vinyl, but was later given a cassette release in 1985. According to Nettwerk VP of A&R and Marketing George Maniatis, Remission "grabbed everybody by the you-know-whats" and, for Nettwerk Records, brought with it an association with industrial dance music. The EP was supported by music videos for the songs "Far Too Frail" and "Smothered Hope", the latter of which being the closest thing to a hit song any North American industrial act had achieved at the time.

Skinny Puppy released its first full-length album Bites in 1985. It was produced by Key and Dave Ogilvie. Tom Ellard of the Australian electronic act Severed Heads lent a hand to the production of Bites, acting as a producer and performing various sampling and mixing duties. Described by Billboard magazine as "techno dance ... a la Kraftwerk", Bites yielded the underground hit "Assimilate". Key and Ogre opened for Chris & Cosey on their 1985 Canadian tour as Hell 'O' Death Day; some of the material the duo had performed would appear on Bites as bonus tracks. One of these bonus tracks, a song called "The Centre Bullet", featured lyrics by Legendary Pink Dots founder Edward Ka-Spel.

While Skinny Puppy had become well received by underground audiences in most major urban areas, due in part to their anti-consumerist themes and Cure-like aesthetics, not everyone was friendly to the group. Key described Skinny Puppy as the antithesis of "the Bruce Springsteen mentality of music", rejecting "Top 40 conformity". Toronto-based music journalist and DJ Greg Clow recalled Michael Williams, who was a VJ for Muchmusic, introducing him to Skinny Puppy, describing them as "Canada's answer to Depeche Mode.

=== Dwayne Goettel and stylistic transition (1986–1987) ===
In 1986, Nettwerk made a distribution deal with Capitol Records, allowing Skinny Puppy and others in Nettwerk's roster to expand their respective audiences. Capitol manager Stephen Powers stated that signing groups such as Skinny Puppy gave the company "a real credibility" with the alternative and college music scenes. Skinny Puppy also signed to Play It Again Sam, allowing the group's music to expand into Europe. It was this expansion into the European market that would help to make Skinny Puppy a "cash cow" for Nettwerk in the early years. In a 2007 interview with CraveOnline, Ogre commented on Skinny Puppy's time with Capitol, saying:

We're so lucky to have gotten here, and if we look back on the fact that we were on Capitol Records at a certain point, being distributed and making these albums under budget… there was one year when we were the only band on the label to profit, when MC Hammer lost a shitload of money. I can still appreciate how odd it was that we had the chance to do that because it doesn't really happen in a lot of cases.

Bill Leeb left Skinny Puppy in 1986 to pursue his own musical project, Front Line Assembly. Leeb gave his reasons for leaving the group stating that his bandmates expressed different ideas from his own and that he had been interested in singing. Leeb's replacement would be quiet Alberta native Dwayne Goettel. A classically trained musician, Goettel had been in a duo named Water with vocalist Sandy Weir and had worked with the synthpop band Psyche, among others.

Skinny Puppy's production values improved with the addition of Goettel, with Key remarking that "Dwayne brought us a whole new sense and aesthetic that we didn't have. Up to that point, we were really punk rock in our approach". Key continued on that "he [Goettel] had an incredible knowledge of equipment and at a very early stage was really the master of sampling, which had really just begun". Goettel's contributions to Skinny Puppy's second full-length effort, 1986's Mind: The Perpetual Intercourse, helped to propel the band towards the style of their "chaotic future masterworks". To promote the album, the band made an appearance on CBC Radio's Brave New Waves program in September 1986, and released their first single, "Dig It". A music video for "Dig It" was produced and received extensive airplay on MTV.

Further promotion for the album came from a world tour with the band Severed Heads. The tour proved to be a vital learning experience for the group, having encounters with, according to Key, "tour managers and agents that didn't pay us". In 1987, the song "Stairs and Flowers" was released as a single, as was a new song titled "Chainsaw". The group attracted the attention of the Parent Music Resource Center (PMRC), which named Mind: The Perpetual Intercourse one of several albums believed to be "violent, sexually explicit, or condoning substance abuse". The album was named by Melody Maker magazine as one of the best releases of the year.

Later in 1987 came Skinny Puppy's third full-length album, Cleanse Fold and Manipulate. Described as "a turning point, where experimentation is just beginning to gel with innovation", the album marks the point where the group began to explore more political themes, delving into topics such as the AIDS epidemic and the Vietnam War. A song from the album, "Addiction" was released as a single. The group later went on tour, with a performance at Toronto's Concert Hall being released on VHS in 1989 and CD in 1991 as Ain't It Dead Yet?. Also released in 1987 was Bites and Remission (through Capitol Records) and Remission & Bites (European release, through Pay It Again Sam), both compilations of Skinny Puppy's first two Nettwerk releases.

=== Subsequent success (1988–1989) ===
Skinny Puppy's live performances had become increasingly elaborate, with Ogre interacting with an onstage crucifix and other "crudely constructed" stage props. Craig MacInnis of the Toronto Star described their new stage show as "neo-dadaist shock theatre", while Tom Lanham of the San Francisco Chronicle referred to it as "grotesque". The band continued to tour in 1988 with the European Head Trauma tour, supported by Edward Ka-Spel. Following the tour, the group returned to the studio to record what Ogre described would be the band's most critical statement regarding animal testing.

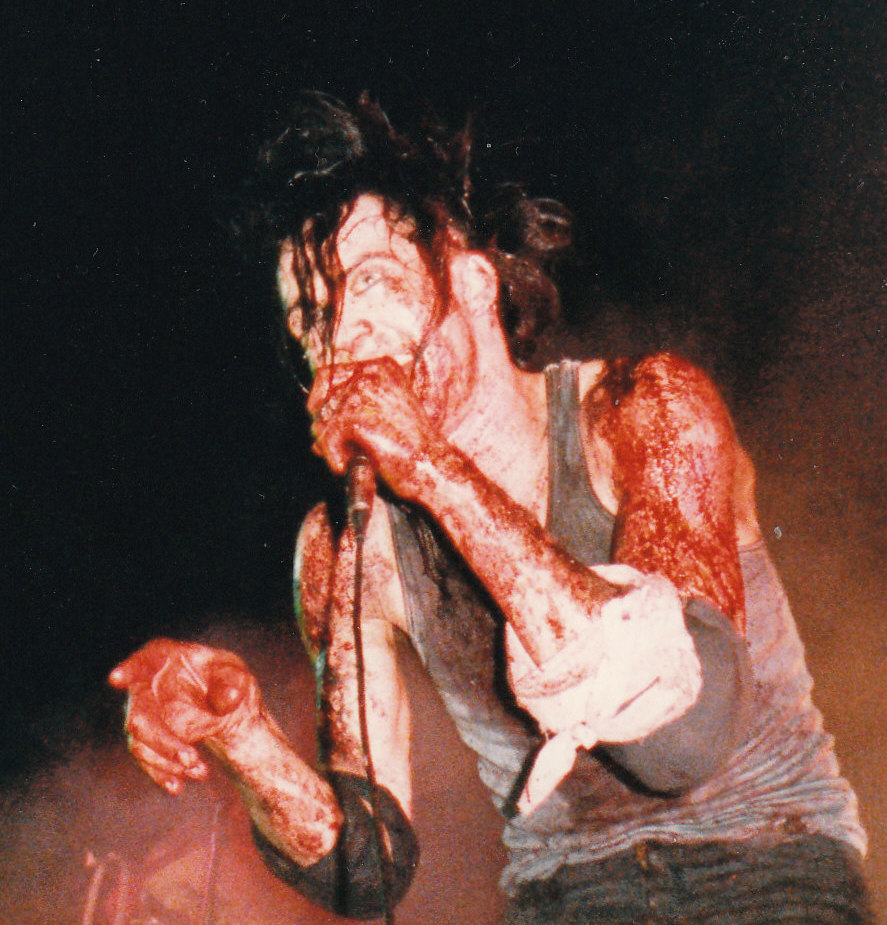
A blood-soaked Ogre performing live

Skinny Puppy released their fourth album, VIVIsectVI, in 1988; the album's name is a pun intended to associate vivisection with Satanism (i.e. the "666 sect"). The group's primary aim with the album was to bring attention to the topic of vivisection and other issues regarding animal rights. The album's subject matter also deals with subjects such as chemical warfare, environmental waste, and disease. Lead track "Dogshit" was released as a single in 1988 under the name "Censor"; the name change was made by the band when it was decided that the single would not sell well with its original name. The single "Testure", which denounced the testing of animals for research purposes, reached No. 19 on Billboard's Hot Dance Music/Club Play chart in 1989.

According to Ogre, "Testure" was intended to be accessible in the hope of spreading their "anti-vivisectionist" message. "It's the only song I think they will be able to play on the radio", he said. "I hope they do play it because it's the only way we can go beyond our ranks and our loyal fans who already understand the message". "Testure" also featured several well-chosen samples from the film The Plague Dogs, an animated adventure about two dogs who escape from a research laboratory. Melody Maker named VIVIsectVI one of the best albums of 1988.

Skinny Puppy toured in support of the album, featuring an early incarnation of the industrial rock band Nine Inch Nails as their opening act. The concept for the live show revolved around a vivisectionist (played by Ogre) who is eventually transformed into a tortured animal; the idea was to portray the "inner workings of the mind under the strain of vivisection". The stage show included the mock vivisection of a stuffed dog the band had named Chud. Following a show in Cincinnati, Ohio, Key, Ogre, and tour manager Dan McGee were arrested for "disorderly conduct" when an audience member, believing the stuffed animal Ogre was "vivisecting" to be a real dog, called the police. Two plainclothes officers entered the group's dressing room demanding they inspect the prop. Following a heated argument, the trio spent the night in jail, but were released the following day after paying a $200 fine.

During the late 1980s and early 1990s, the band members began working on various side projects. Key and Goettel were involved with the Tear Garden (a collaboration with the Legendary Pink Dots) and Doubting Thomas (an outlet for their non-Skinny Puppy instrumentals). The band Hilt, a collaboration between Key and Goettel, and Al Nelson, also started when Nettwerk challenged the group to produce an album for as little money as possible. Ogre struck up a friendship with Ministry's Al Jourgensen, having first worked together during the recording of the PTP song "Show Me Your Spine" (featured in the 1987 film RoboCop).

For Skinny Puppy's fifth album, Rabies, released in 1989, Jourgensen joined Rave as producer. The album, featuring Jourgensen's electric guitar work and backing vocals, drew mixed reception from fans. Despite these reactions, the album was a commercial success, selling 150,000 copies and receiving extensive airplay on college radio. The single "Worlock" – which featured samples of Charles Manson singing parts of the song "Helter Skelter" from The Beatles' White Album, accompanied by a fragmented portion of the songs guitar introduction – helped to bring the band "massive popularity". A video produced for the song, featuring spliced-together footage from dozens of horror films and a statement denouncing censorship of the genre by the MPAA, was circulated widely as a promotional and bootleg item. The song "Tin Omen" was also released as a single and "Hexonxonx" received some airplay on alternative radio. In spite of the album's initial mixed reception, Brad Filicky in a 2003 issue of CMJ magazine named Rabies as a classic album, calling it "a masterpiece of the industrial genre".

This period marked the beginning of divisions within the band, as rather than tour in support of Rabies, Ogre joined Ministry while they toured in support of their album The Mind Is a Terrible Thing to Taste (1989); Ogre contributed guitars, keyboards, and vocals during the tour. Ogre had also begun working with the Ministry side project Revolting Cocks. Key was later quoted saying of Ogre's involvement with Ministry and, later on, Martin Atkins' Pigface that he sometimes felt "like a wife that's been cheated on".

=== Too Dark Park (1990–1991) ===
Following the production of Rabies, a divide grew between the group members, with Key and Goettel often siding against Ogre, feeling he was more interested in solo work. The group were ultimately disappointed with the outcome of Rabies, with Goettel saying that the completed product was "less within the Skinny Puppy vision", and Key being displeased with Jourgensen's involvement. Ogre also expressed his disapproval for the album, claiming that he had "flopped". "The work and artistic environment really weren't there at all either. It was completely negative".

Key and Goettel completed work on some of their side projects such as Hilt, releasing their first effort, Call the Ambulance (Before I Hurt Myself), which was produced by Rave. Key also reunited with Bill Leeb to form the project known as Cyberaktif; Goettel acted as an assistant producer and provided some instrumentation. Jourgensen offered Ogre the chance to tour with the Revolting Cocks, having provided vocals on their previous tour. Ogre refused the offer, citing some occurrences during his time with Ministry which led him to question his friendship with Jourgensen.

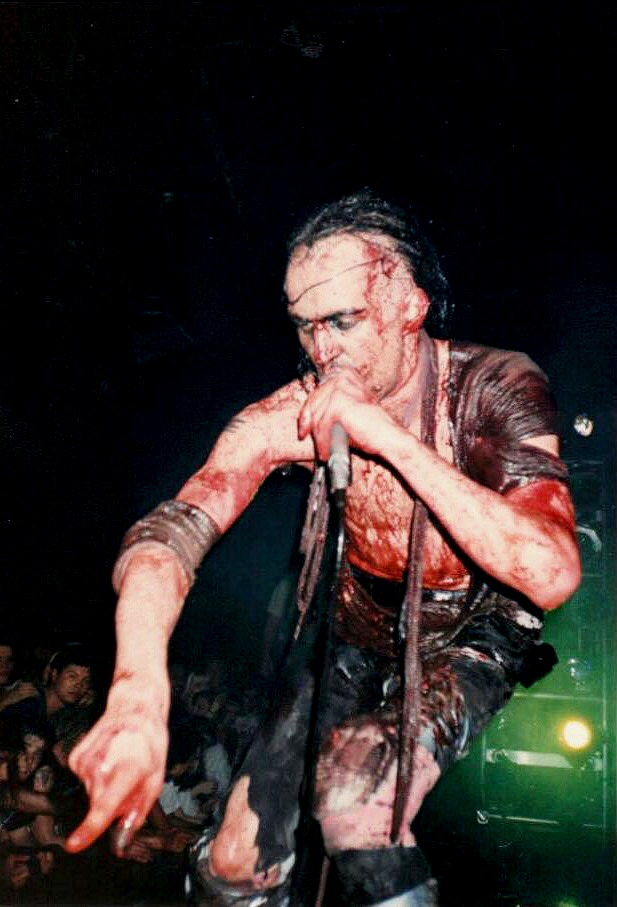
Ogre performing during the Too Dark Park tour, 1990

The group, having finished work on their various side projects, returned to the studio and released their sixth studio album, Too Dark Park, in 1990. Goettel said in a radio interview that the major intentions behind the album were to reevaluate what Skinny Puppy was and create a new style of music to mark the beginning of a new decade. This reevaluation included hiring Jim Cummins (I, Braineater) to design the cover artwork, feeling that their longtime designer Steven Gilmore had lost his creative spark.

Described as "forceful and consistently abrasive", Too Dark Park was what Key referred to as the true successor to "the last pure" Skinny Puppy album, VIVIsectVI. Critics such as Staci Bonner of Spin magazine applauded the use of sampling and stated that the album was a "return to the bloodbath" for the group. The album yielded the singles "Tormentor" and "Spasmolytic", the latter of which spawned a music video directed by Jim Van Bebber. Billboard called "Spasmolytic" a "delicious mind-altering affair", a sentiment shared by Wil Lewellyn of Treblezine who included the song in a list of the best underground songs of the 1990s.

Environmental degradation was a major theme on both the album and the North American Too Dark Park tour. For the tour, Key took on the role of drummer, leaving Goettel as lead keyboardist. Key told Alternative Press that "we could very well have a backing tape and stand behind synths playing two notes on the keyboard, but we've decided to physically strain ourselves and learn additional parts along with what we've already written". Onstage theatrics included a segment with Ogre performing on stucco stilts and pneumatic crutches, Ogre being hoisted from the stage by cables, and a backing film featuring scenes of graphic violence, most notably sequences from the Japanese film series Guinea Pig. Ogre later gave insight on the backing film's conception, saying:

We did an experiment ... We've always been accused of celebrating violence for idiotic reasons. [So] we used some images in our show from a film called Guinea Pig. They're these incredibly realistic, but simulated, Japanese snuff films. We inserted them into this roller-coaster ride of violent images and people were quite disgusted. People were vomiting in front of the stage. People came up to me after the show, saying I was the most disgusting human being-until they found out what it was all about. The whole reason we did that was to see if there was a difference. Will people react differently to something that's real as opposed to something they know is staged? They will. There's a whole different set of emotions people go through. It doesn't look like it looks on TV. It's quite sickening.

Ogre, who considered the tour to be a high point in his career, compared the band's performances to something like intense car races. "People go there expecting an accident to happen ... I was really running off that car-crash energy".

Following the tour, Ogre became involved with Martin Atkins' project Pigface in 1991, for a short time becoming the group's lead vocalist. Pigface included talent from several other industrial groups such as William Rieflin of Ministry and Trent Reznor of Nine Inch Nails, who helped record the song "Suck". Ogre and Reznor performed the song together in the live album Welcome to Mexico... Asshole. Also on the album was a cover of the song "T.F.W.O." from Too Dark Park, led by Ogre.

In 2003, Alexander Chow of Spin magazine named Too Dark Park an essential industrial album, stating that "schizophrenic beats, manic-depressive mumblings, and just the right dose of fist-raising choruses" made for a dance floor favorite.

=== Last Rights (1992) ===
Following Too Dark Park, Skinny Puppy was commissioned by the dance group La La La Human Steps to compose several songs for their 1991 production Infante C'est Destroy, a duty shared alongside the likes of Einstürzende Neubauten. During this time Ogre made a concerted effort to kick his drug addictions. In an interview with CITR-FM, Ogre discussed his ordeals with hepatitis A and subsequent hospilization; he also thanked Pigface for looking after him during his "hour of need".

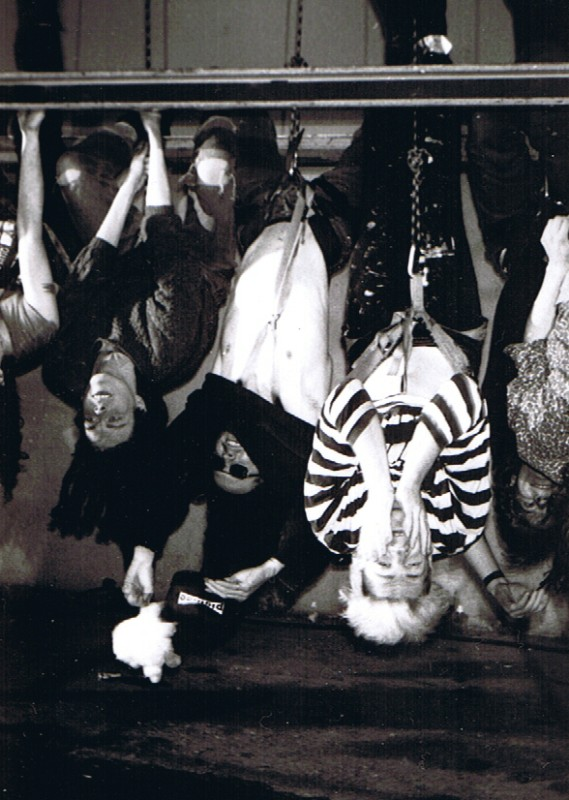
Pigface: Nivek Ogre (center) with Chris Connelly (left) and Martin Atkins

Skinny Puppy released their seventh studio album, Last Rights, in 1992. It was the last album the band released under Nettwerk/Capitol. Relationships between the band members during the album's production were "tense and unhealthy", with Ogre, under the supervision of Rave, coming into the studio at night to perform vocals for the music Key and Goettel composed earlier in the day. Ogre said that the production of Last Rights acted as a form of therapy which he used to help him come to terms with his addictions. "It's painful for me to be reminded of certain things, but for me to say it never happened is wrong. I'll be glad to put it behind me, but I had to do this".

Described by Entertainment Weekly as a "nonstop stretch of horrific soundscapes", Last Rights became the first Skinny Puppy record to chart on the Billboard 200, peaking at No. 193. The album remained on Billboard's Heatseekers album chart for several weeks, peaking at No. 10. The track "Inquisition" was released as a single and included several alternative cuts of the song, as well as the b-side "LaHuman8" (one of the tracks produced for La La La Human Steps). A second single, "Love in Vein", was never released, although an unfinished remix intended for it later appeared on Brap: Back and Forth Series 3 & 4 in 1996. A music video was created for the song "Killing Game" which featured a student dance troupe performing in "high-contrast black and white".

A track titled "Left Handshake" was excluded from Last Rights, leaving a blank track 10 on some copies of the album. Clearance for a lengthy vocal sample from Timothy Leary's Turn On, Tune In, Drop Out, was approved by Leary, but denied by the copyright holder, Henry G. Saperstein. Commenting on the ordeal, Key said, "We tried to convince him, but he [Saperstein] said, 'it doesn't matter what Leary said, he doesn't own his own work'". The song, in which Ogre provides commentary to Leary's instructions for avoiding a "bad trip", was eventually released on the initial European edition of Brap: Back and Forth Series 3 & 4 in 1996, and on a limited edition single called "Track 10" sold at the Skinny Puppy reunion concert in 2000 at Dresden.

The stage show for the Last Rights tour in North America, much like the album itself, was built around a detailed narrative inspired by Ogre's past ordeals with drug abuse. The show involved Ogre interacting with a backing film by way of a virtual reality machine, a tree made of human heads and fetuses, and numerous other props and costumes. For this tour, Key once more focused exclusively on live drumming, leaving Goettel on keyboard duty. One incident that occurred at a show in Boston involved several concert goers climbing on stage and grabbing at Ogre's various masks and props, several of which were stolen. The band's manager, Tim Gore, pursued the thieves but was punched by a security guard. Following the punch, Gore began having issues breathing and was taken to a hospital; the guard was fired as a result of the incident.

=== The Process, Goettel's death and breakup (1993–1999) ===
In 1993, Skinny Puppy contributed the song "Ode to Groovy" to the compilation album In Defense of Animals, released through Restless Records. The album was named after the animal rights group of the same name. Though the track is credited to Skinny Puppy, Ogre and Rave were the only people to work on it.

Ogre, Key and Goettel, landed a three-album deal with American Recordings, and moved to Malibu to record The Process, a concept album inspired by 1960s cult The Process Church of The Final Judgment, with Roli Mosimann producing. The recording sessions were beset by everything from fires and floods, to the Northridge earthquake. Mosimann was eventually replaced with Martin Atkins. Atkins' presence exacerbated the rift that was forming between Ogre and the rest of the band. The band's bickering and excessive drug use made the recording process so long and costly, that American reduced Skinny Puppy's contract to one album. In 1994, Key and Goettel returned to Vancouver with the master tapes, but Ogre remained in Los Angeles and quit Skinny Puppy in June 1995. Goettel was found dead of a heroin overdose in his parents' home two months later.

The Process was eventually completed with Rave and released in 1996. It was dedicated to the memory of Goettel. It was an overall stylistic departure from their previous albums, prominently featuring untreated vocals, guitar, and more accessible song structures. The liner notes that accompanied the CD included thank-yous to "Electronic Music Lovers" and "Puppy People", followed by the words "The End" in bold type. The album charted on the Billboard 200 at No. 102 and reached the No. 1 spot on Billboard's Heatseekers album chart.

During the Process era, a loose-knit art/philosophy collective also known as The Process was formed, with early contributions from Ogre and Genesis P-Orridge, among others. P-Orridge and Larry Thrasher jammed with Skinny Puppy during this period, a recording of which was eventually released as Puppy Gristle on a limited basis in 2002. The creation of the Download project, which Key and Goettel formed with Mark Spybey and Phil Western, also occurred at this time. Download explored everything from electronic improvisation with spoken vocals to techno, and toured in 1996.

Earlier, in 1993, Goettel and Western had issued a breakbeat hardcore single (under the name aDuck) on their own label, Subconscious Records. After Goettel's death, Subconscious evolved into a recording studio and record label imprint that Key used to release a number of his own and Skinny Puppy's recordings. Key also continued to work with The Tear Garden, produced industrial/trance music with Western in the side project platEAU, and released his first solo album in 1998.

"Smothered Hope (Ogre & Mark Walk remix)"
from remix dystemper (1998)

Ogre had toured extensively with Martin Atkins' industrial supergroup Pigface since 1991, and toured with them again after leaving Skinny Puppy. He recorded material for his side project WELT. with Ruby's Mark Walk before quitting Skinny Puppy, but due to legal issues with American Recordings, this would not see release until 2001 under the new name, ohGr. In the meantime, he toured with KMFDM, and released an album with Martin Atkins under the name Rx (also known as Ritalin). The ohGr and Rx releases included some of Ogre's most positive and forward-thinking songwriting to date. Several collections were released while Skinny Puppy was dormant, including Brap: Back and Forth Series 3 & 4 in 1996, and The Singles Collect and B-Sides Collect in 1999. Nettwerk commissioned a remix album in 1998; titled remix dystemper, it featured various Skinny Puppy tracks re-worked by artists including Autechre, Deftones, and Guru. Ogre and Walk also took part, contributing a remix of "Dig It" and an updated version of Remission's "Smothered Hope" with new vocals by Ogre.

In 1999, "Draining Faces" (1987) appeared on the soundtrack for The Blair Witch Project.

=== Reunion, The Greater Wrong of the Right and Mythmaker (2000–2008) ===
In August 2000, Ogre and Key reunited and performed live as Skinny Puppy for the first time since 1992, at Doomsday Festival. The show was meant to be a continuation of the Last Rights tour, with the stage design taking influence from those performances. Rather than find a replacement for Goettel, the band simply left the keyboard station on stage empty. The performance was filmed and recorded, and a live album, Doomsday: Back and Forth Series 5: Live in Dresden, was released in 2001; a DVD release was planned but canceled by Nettwerk. Live clips of "Testure" and "Worlock" as well as a behind the scenes interview with the band were broadcast on Crazy Clip TV in Germany and "Worlock" was included on a VCD compilation by German magazine Sonic Seducer in 2002.

Key joined ohGr on drums for its 2001 tour, while Ogre appeared on the track "Frozen Sky" on Key's 2001 album The Ghost of Each Room. When asked by Terrorizer magazine about the future of Skinny Puppy, Key responded:

Our goals for the future are to combine everything, take the best of what we can do with Ogre, and the best of what we have from our past, as well as the future stuff that we can do, and put it into one touring situation which I'm sure will stroll back into bloodville.

The first new Skinny Puppy track in several years, "Optimissed", appeared on the Underworld soundtrack in 2003.

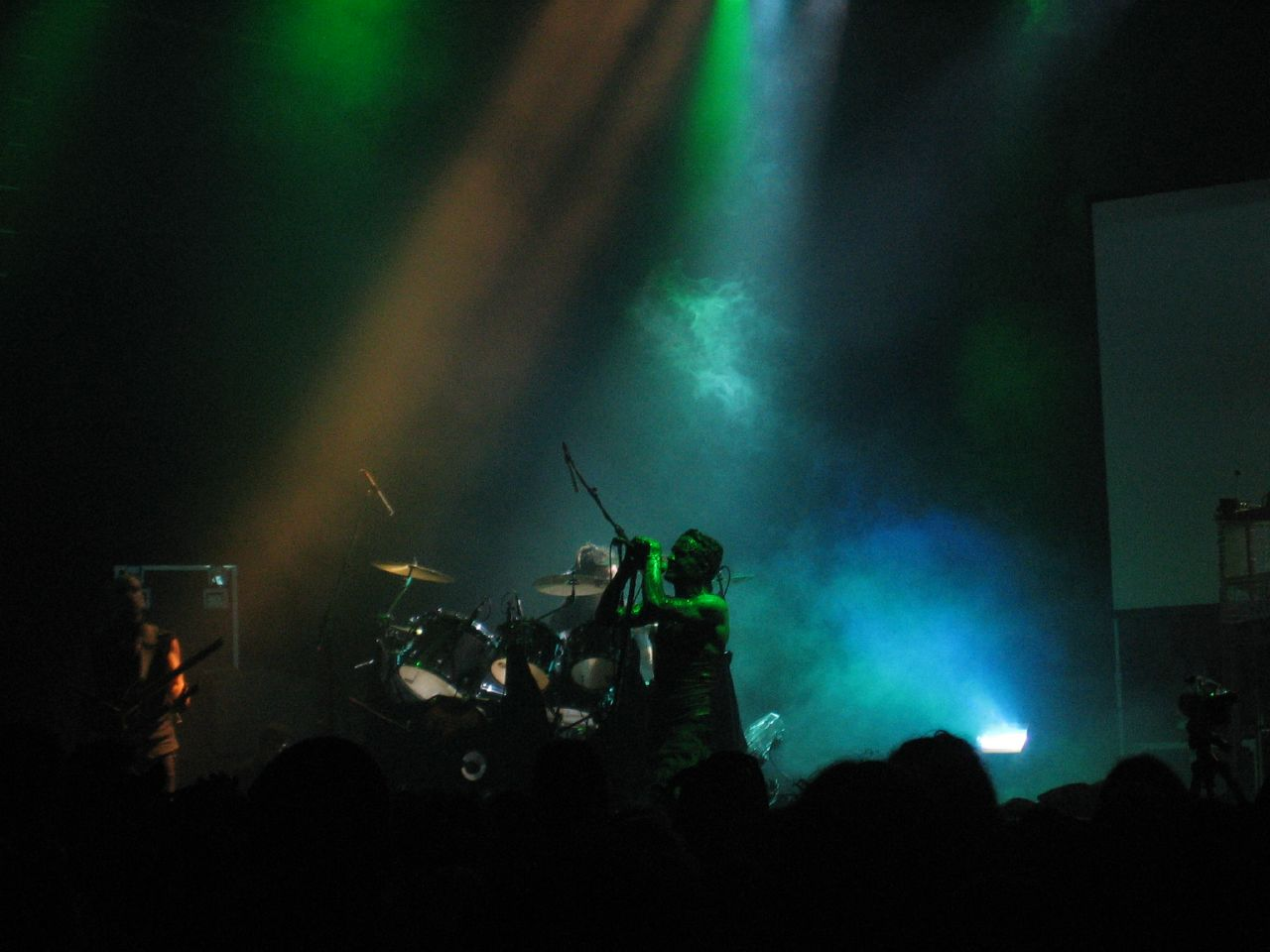
Skinny Puppy performing live at the London Astoria in 2005

Ogre, Key, Mark Walk and various guests, including Danny Carey of Tool and Wayne Static of Static-X, recorded the band's ninth studio album, The Greater Wrong of the Right, released in 2004 on Synthetic Symphony, a sub-label of SPV. The album, described by Key as being based in "pseudopop", received generally favorable reviews from critics and landed on several Billboard charts. A music video was made for the song "Pro-Test" which featured a style unlike many of the group's previous work, so much so that some were unsure if it was an official video.

Since there was no tour support for The Process, 2004 marked the formal return of Skinny Puppy, with a full North America and Europe tour; selling out larger than usual venues. Shows in Toronto and Montreal were filmed for the live DVD Greater Wrong of the Right Live, which was released in September 2005. The DVD included Information Warfare, a documentary made by Morrison about the U.S.-led wars in Iraq. The anti-Bush administration stance taken by the band at their live shows drew the ire of PABAAH (Patriotic Americans Boycotting Anti-American Hollywood), which attempted a boycott of college radio stations that played Skinny Puppy.

Skinny Puppy toured Europe again in 2005, and returned to the studio to complete their next album, Mythmaker, which was released in January 2007. The album reached No. 4 on the Independent Albums Chart, No. 5 on the Dance/Electronic Albums Chart, and No. 17 on the Heatseekers Chart, but barely broke the Billboard 200. The band's 2007 North American and European tour, titled Mythrus, began in May 2007. While some fans longed for the sounds of their earlier days, Ogre, speaking with Electronic Musician, stated the band's intention was to move forward rather than dwell in the past. "Some people think that the stuff we do now is a pale imitation of the past. All of the older stuff had a time and place, and we decided to move forward to where we are now".

=== In Solvent See tour and HanDover (2009–2012) ===
According to a news posting on the official Skinny Puppy website, the band's next studio album was originally slated for release in October 2009, but the release of this album was delayed due to insolvency issues with the SPV label (thus leading to Ogre naming the 2009 tour the "In Solvent See" tour). These issues were not expected to be resolved until the end of 2009. However, the "In Solvent See" Tour took place as planned, and began on 30 October.

In October 2010, there were reports that the new Skinny Puppy album would be released in February 2011. In May 2011, Skinny Puppy announced that they finished recording a new album titled HanDover, and that they were soliciting it to other record labels for a September 2011 release date. On 27 August 2011, HanDover was officially confirmed as having a 25 October 2011, release in the United States and a 28 October 2011, release in Europe. Steven R. Gilmore created the artwork for the album once again. The album landed on a number of Billboard charts, including a spot at No. 168 on the Billboard 200 and No. 9 on the Top Dance/Electronic Albums chart.

Skinny Puppy were scheduled to perform at numerous European festivals in the summer of 2010, including the Amphi Festival in Germany, the 2010 Waregem Gothic Festival in Belgium, and the Recession Festival in Denmark. A live album, titled Bootlegged, Broke and in Solvent Seas and recorded on the band's 2010 European tour, was released on 12 June 2012.

=== Weapon, subsequent tours, and Final Tour (2013–2023) ===
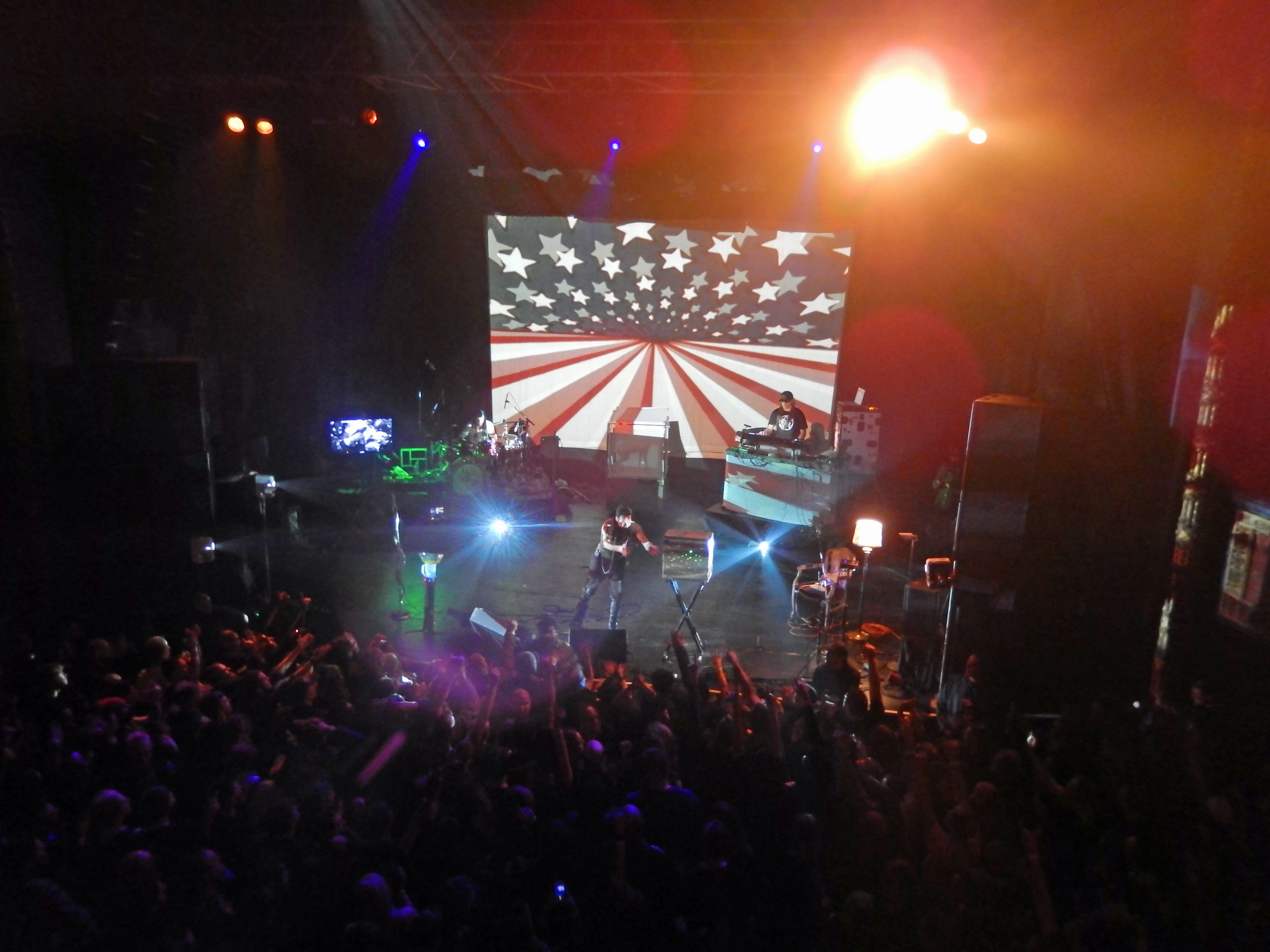
Skinny Puppy during the Live Shapes for Arms tour

Skinny Puppy announced that a new album, entitled Weapon, would be released on 28 May 2013. The album was inspired by news brought to the band by a former guard at Guantanamo Bay that their music had been used to torture inmates. Inspiration also came from the Fukushima Daiichi nuclear disaster and from Ogre's personal views on the human species; in an interview with Vice, Ogre stated that he "view[s] the human being primarily as a weapon, and a lot of the things that we've created have had disastrous effects on us as a species". The album was released to generally favorable reviews from critics, several noting the 1980s-esque musical style, and included a re-hashed version of the Remission-era track "Solvent".

Key told the Phoenix New Times that the band had been dissatisfied with HanDover's production schedule, noting that it had taken them several years to produce the album. For Weapon, they made a return to the fast-paced, one-song-a-day style of their early years. The decision to remake the song "Solvent" helped to set the album's quickened pace; Key said that the music they were making for the album wouldn't sound correct "If it didn't sound like something we had just made quickly, like in the old days".

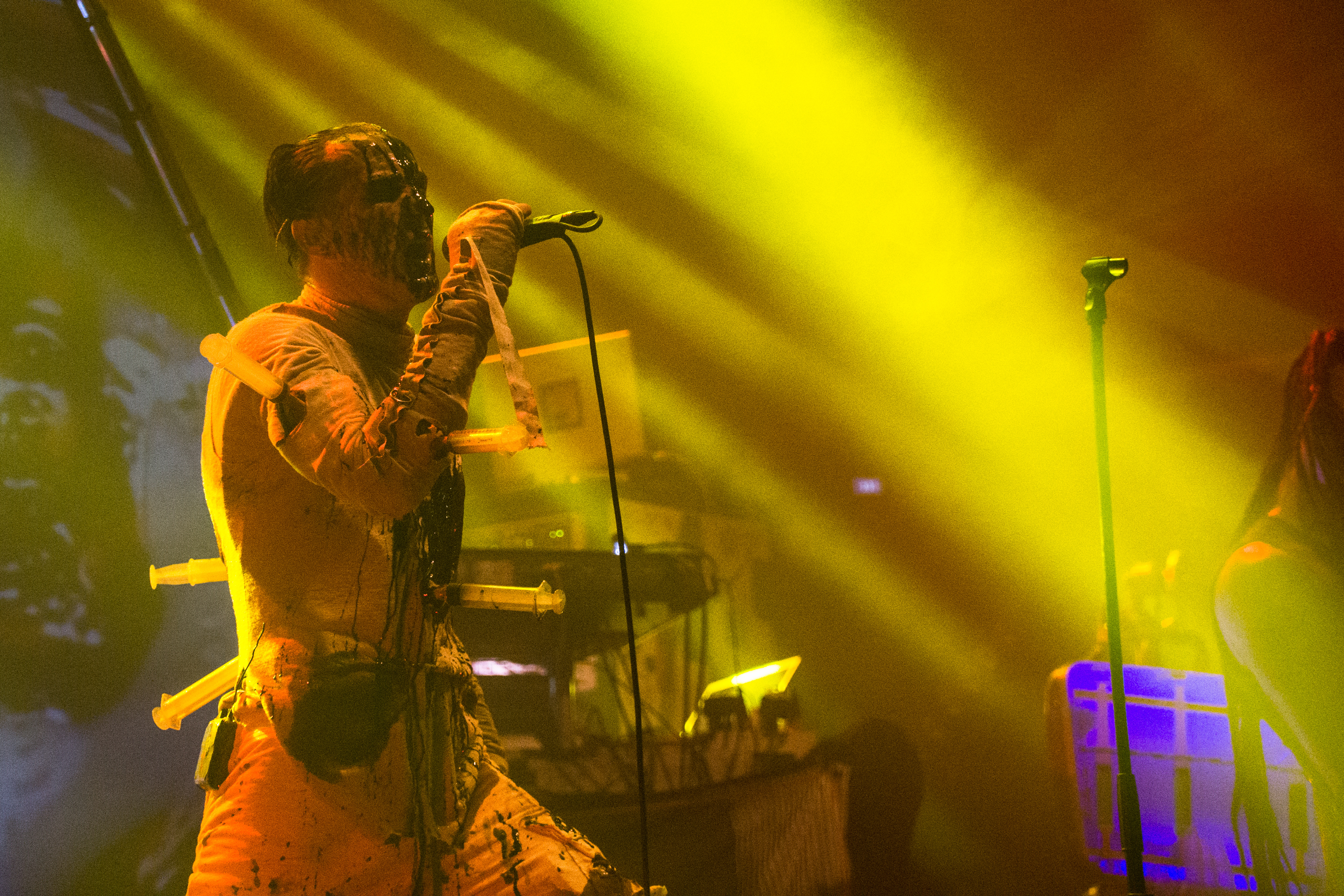
At Primavera Sound, 2017

The band released a music video for the song "Illisit" and in October 2013, announced their Live Shapes for Arms Tour, a North American tour starting in January 2014 at The Observatory in Santa Ana, CA. In early 2014, Ogre and Key sent an invoice of $666,000 to the US government for the use of their music at Guantanamo Bay, bringing the issue to the attention of mainstream media outlets. Later in 2014, the Alliance of Sound tour was announced, with performances by Skinny Puppy, VNV Nation, Haujobb, and Youth Code. However, in early November, Front Line Assembly replaced VNV Nation and the tour was renamed Eye vs. Spy, which was a 17-city North American tour between 28 November to 20 December 2014.

In June 2015, Skinny Puppy performed at the Amnesia Rockfest in Montebello, Canada, alongside acts such as Ministry and The Dillinger Escape Plan. Following two successful tours with Weapon, the band yet again embarked with Youth Code, this time to play shows across North America in 2015 and across Europe in 2017 under the Down the SocioPath tour, which dropped all Weapon tracks and instead introduced many songs from the band's 1996 album, The Process, which had not been accompanied by any live performances due to the death of Goettel in 1995. Unlike the previous tours for Weapon, Down the SocioPath scaled back the theatrics and introduced Matthew Setzer as a live guitarist. Ogre began these concerts in a white hooded robe which was removed to reveal a suit into which a stagehand inserted oversized needles. The Down the Sociopath Too Euro 2017 leg lasted from 30 May to 16 June 2017. The tour included stops at the Download Festival in France, Primavera Sound, and Wave-Gotik-Treffen.

In February 2023, the "Skinny Puppy: Final Tour" was announced. The tour coincided with the band's 40th anniversary. The initial leg ran from April 5 to May 9 and included a stop at Sick New World on May 13. In July 2023, a second leg of The Final Tour was announced, lasting from November 8 to December 5, after which the group disbanded.

== Style ==
=== Sound ===
"Morter"
"Morter", from The Process, demonstrates the band's departure from the style of previous albums.

Inspired by the music of Suicide, SPK, Kraftwerk, Yellow Magic Orchestra, Cabaret Voltaire, Chrome, Throbbing Gristle, Bauhaus, Joy Division, New Order, Depeche Mode, Fad Gadget, Nocturnal Emissions, Portion Control, and The Legendary Pink Dots, music which had been accessible to the band primarily via tape exchange, Skinny Puppy experimented with analog and digital recording techniques, composing multi-layered music with synthesizers, drum machines, acoustic percussion, tape loops, samplers, and conventional rock music instruments to create what they called "audio sculpture". Their extensive use of sampling from horror films and radio broadcasts served to "clarify or obscure" song meanings, and they applied liberal amounts of distortion and other effects to Ogre's vocals, which are often delivered as a stream of consciousness. Lyrics commonly reference social and political subjects including animal rights, environmental degradation, drug addiction, suicide, war, privacy, and self-determination. They have also used their music to draw attention to events such as the Tiananmen Square protests of 1989, the Kent State Massacre, the AIDS epidemic, and the 2011 Fukushima Daiichi nuclear disaster. Skinny Puppy's often informal, improvisational approach to musical composition is indicated by use of the term "brap", coined by them and defined as a verb meaning "to get together, hook up electronic instruments, get high, and record".

Initially a dark synth-pop group, Skinny Puppy took on a more industrial sound following the inclusion of Dwayne Goettel in 1986, and later came to be recognized as pioneers of the electro-industrial genre. Their music has been described as encompassing a range styles including ambient music, avant-funk, noise rock and industrial metal. The music that followed Goettel's death has been likened to genres such as glitch and intelligent dance music. The Village Voice described Skinny Puppy's early work as "dark electro-pop", while Billboard's Bill Coleman thought of them as a "moody techno-outfit" with an "aggravating" musical delivery. People magazine called Ogre's vocals "incomprehensible", and likened the group's use of sampling to noises heard on "a TV set in an adjoining hotel room". AllMusic referred to Skinny Puppy's music as "primal" and "Kraftwerk gone netherworld", going on to say that unlike the bands that followed in their wake, "Ogre and Key knew how to craft tunes and marry them to the most ingenious of sound patterns". Ogre told the Windsor Star in 1986 that "in some sense our music, or the feeling expressed by our music, is felt by a lot more people" than had been anticipated.

Ogre said in an interview with Auxiliary Magazine in June 2013, "there is a very military side to Industrial music, and we are far more in the psychedelic side."

=== Music videos ===
Due to their graphic nature, the majority of Skinny Puppy's videos received limited commercial airplay, or were outright banned from broadcast. The music video for "Stairs and Flowers" was banned by the Canadian Censorship Bureau because of scenes depicting "an excrement-covered woman being beaten by soldiers"; the woman in question was Ogre soaked in mud. The letterbox effect used in the video for "Dig It", which portrayed stock market footage, was accused by both the bureau and MuchMusic to instead be showing pornography. Also banned was the video for "Testure", an action resulting from a viewer poll held by CityTV, as was the video for the song "Worlock", which was banned from MTV. Ogre, a self-described horror fan, defended the "Worlock" video by saying "I knew there was no way they'd play 'Worlock' there [the United States]. But I went out to make that video so no one would play it!"; he affirmed that the video was meant to draw attention to censorship in horror films. Some of the band's videos have received airplay, such as those for the promotional songs "Killing Game" and "Pro-test"; "Dig It" was also regularly played on MTV. A 30-second television promo was produced for the band by Capitol Records in 1987, featuring a mix of scenes from the "Stairs and Flowers" and "Dig It" videos.

In a 1990 radio interview, Goettel explained the group's outlook on music videos, stating that "it's great to do videos when you have the money to do them, but for Skinny Puppy's part it's less of a promotional tool". He said that touring and word of mouth were their preferred avenues of promotion. "When a video gets made its not like 'OK we're going to spend $50,000 and it's going to sell this many more records'... it doesn't sell any more records".

=== Live performances ===
Skinny Puppy was noted for theatrical and controversial live performances which blend performance art with music. Ogre has been critical of the band's early performances, telling Spin magazine in 1992 that "I would do things on stage that would blow – they just wouldn't work". Live performances involved periods of musical improvisation, film projections, and elaborate stage props and machines, many of which are designed and built by Ogre himself. While discussing Skinny Puppy's performances, Ogre remarked that "our shows combine images with theater. It works better than just coming out and doing a horror magic routine". He explained to the Vancouver Sun in 1988 that he wanted his act to have "that grey area where anything could happen – where I can cut my head off by accident and people will go, 'wow, that's great'".

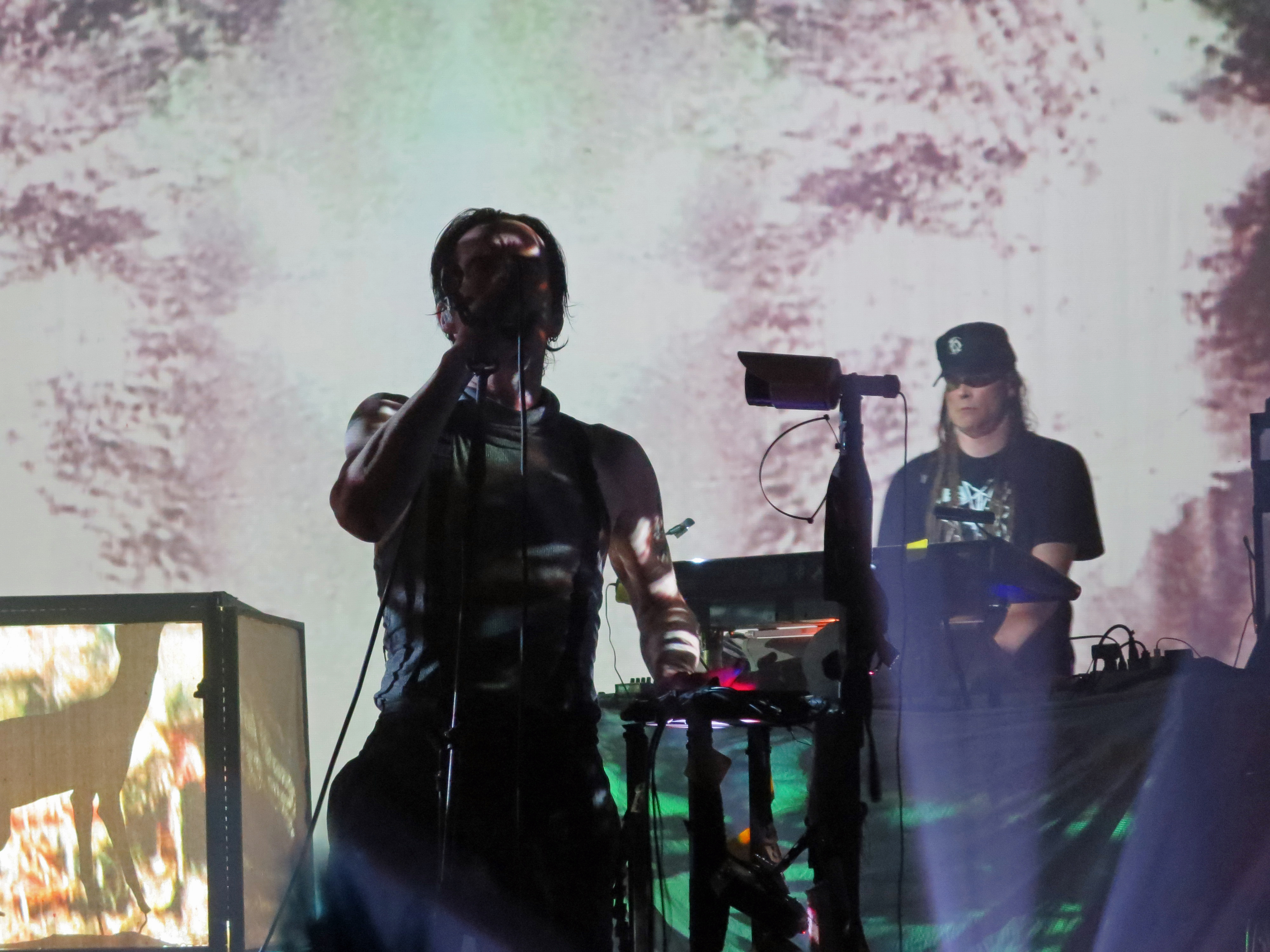
Nivek Ogre and cEvin Key performing live in 2014

On-stage theatrics included Ogre being suspended from racks and cables, play with a hangman's noose, use of an angle grinder, and mock executions of Ogre and George W. Bush. Following the 2004 United States presidential election, promoters began to ask the band to refrain from using fake blood during their performances. This reaction was prompted by the performance of a mock execution on stage, during which Ogre was "decapitated" by actors dressed as then U.S. President George W. Bush and Vice President Dick Cheney. The band was also asked by Samsung (who had been asked by Ogre to sponsor the band with a large flat screen) to "not insult the president" while performing on stage. In a 1987 television interview with Kim Clarke Champniss, Key explained that while Ogre follows a "rough guideline" during a live performance, a majority of his on-stage theatrics are conceived spontaneously. Key told Champniss that Ogre's demeanor on stage could "range from just a sort of laid back kind of lurking to a rampant psycho". Ogre once remarked that touring was, for himself, like "dating hydrogen peroxide", referencing the numerous injuries which he would acquire over the course of touring.

Though Ogre and Key were the only constant members of Skinny Puppy's live act since Goettel's death, the pair hired various other musicians to assist them onstage. They included drummer Justin Bennett, guitarist William Morrison, and guitarist Matthew Setzer.

== Influence and legacy ==
"Testure"
One of the more influential Skinny Puppy songs, "Testure" was the most successful single from VIVIsectVI.

Despite little mainstream airplay, several Skinny Puppy releases have charted in North America and Europe, and their influence on industrial and electronic music is considerable. Widely considered originators of a unique sound and live performance style, Skinny Puppy were also known as pioneers of the industrial rock and electro-industrial genres. They were one of the earliest groups to help popularize industrial music, and the Los Angeles Times recognized Ogre as the "first industrial rock star". Their gloomy and androgynous aesthetic helped attract the attention of the goth scene, from which they were able to draw a larger female audience than any previous industrial group. By the end of the 90s, they had sold some two million records for Nettwerk worldwide, and two of their releases, Remission and Bites, were certified gold in Canada.

Their music has spawned "a litter of like-minded bands", including industrial rock project Nine Inch Nails, who opened for Skinny Puppy for a short time on their 1988 VIVIsectVI tour. Trent Reznor also acknowledged that Skinny Puppy's "Dig It" inspired the very first Nine Inch Nails track written, "Down in It". Canadian synth-pop artist Grimes includes Skinny Puppy as an influence on her music, having grown up in Vancouver's industrial music scene. Sara Taylor of the EBM group Youth Code has said that the song "Worlock" was "one of the most influential songs" she had ever heard. Other artists impacted by Skinny Puppy's music include Marilyn Manson, Chester Bennington, Moby, Jonathan Davis, Daron Malakian, 3Teeth, Foals vocalist Yannis Philippakis, Al Jourgensen, Chris Vrenna, John Grant, Mortiis, Blush Response, Celldweller, Finite Automata, Shooter Jennings, Death Grips vocalist MC Ride, X Marks the Pedwalk, Wumpscut, Haujobb, Orgy, Filter, Front Line Assembly, Orphx, JPEGMAFIA, Karyn Crisis, Crystal Castles, AFI side project Blaqk Audio, and Mayhem vocalist Attila Csihar.

The band inspired a tribute album, Hymns of the Worlock: A Tribute to Skinny Puppy published by Cleopatra Records, which features groups such as Crocodile Shop and The Electric Hellfire Club. Skinny Puppy's remix album Remix dystemper includes contributions from a wide array of musicians such as electronic music DJ Josh Wink, Guru, KMFDM, Deftones, and former Nine Inch Nails drummer Chris Vrenna. Vrenna's solo project, Tweaker, opened for Skinny Puppy during their 2004 North American tour. Danny Carey from Tool and Wayne Static of Static-X provided drums and backup vocals, respectively, for the song "Use Less" from The Greater Wrong of the Right.

Ogre worked with KMFDM on several occasions, touring with them in 1997 and providing vocals on the song "Torture" from their album Symbols (the song also features production from Dave Ogilvie) as well as for the songs "That's All" and "Full Worm Garden" from 1999's Adios. Skinny Puppy also provided a remix for the Mötley Crüe song "Hooligan's Holiday"; Nikki Sixx reported that the band "just dumped the whole song in the computer and went off".

Skinny Puppy's music has been included in the soundtracks of films such as Bad Influence, An American Werewolf in Paris, The Blair Witch Project, Underworld, and Saw II, among others. The group was given a brief role as the "gang of goons" in the 1995 dark comedy film The Doom Generation. The 1996 Video Game Descent II included original music from Ogre and Mark Walk, while the 2014 PlayStation exclusive LittleBigPlanet 3 featured the song "Rodent" from the album Rabies.

Alternative Press included Skinny Puppy in their 1996 list of "100 underground inspirations of the past 20 years."

While discussing the possibility of Nine Inch Nails being inducted into the Rock and Roll Hall of Fame, Richard Patrick of the band Filter remarked "what about Skinny Puppy?", going on to say that while Nine Inch Nails is the more famous of the two, Skinny Puppy were one of the first groups to craft "scary and mean" industrial music.

Daron Malakian did a punk metal, shortened cover for their song Assimilate for his 2018 album Dictator (Scars on Broadway).

== Side-projects ==
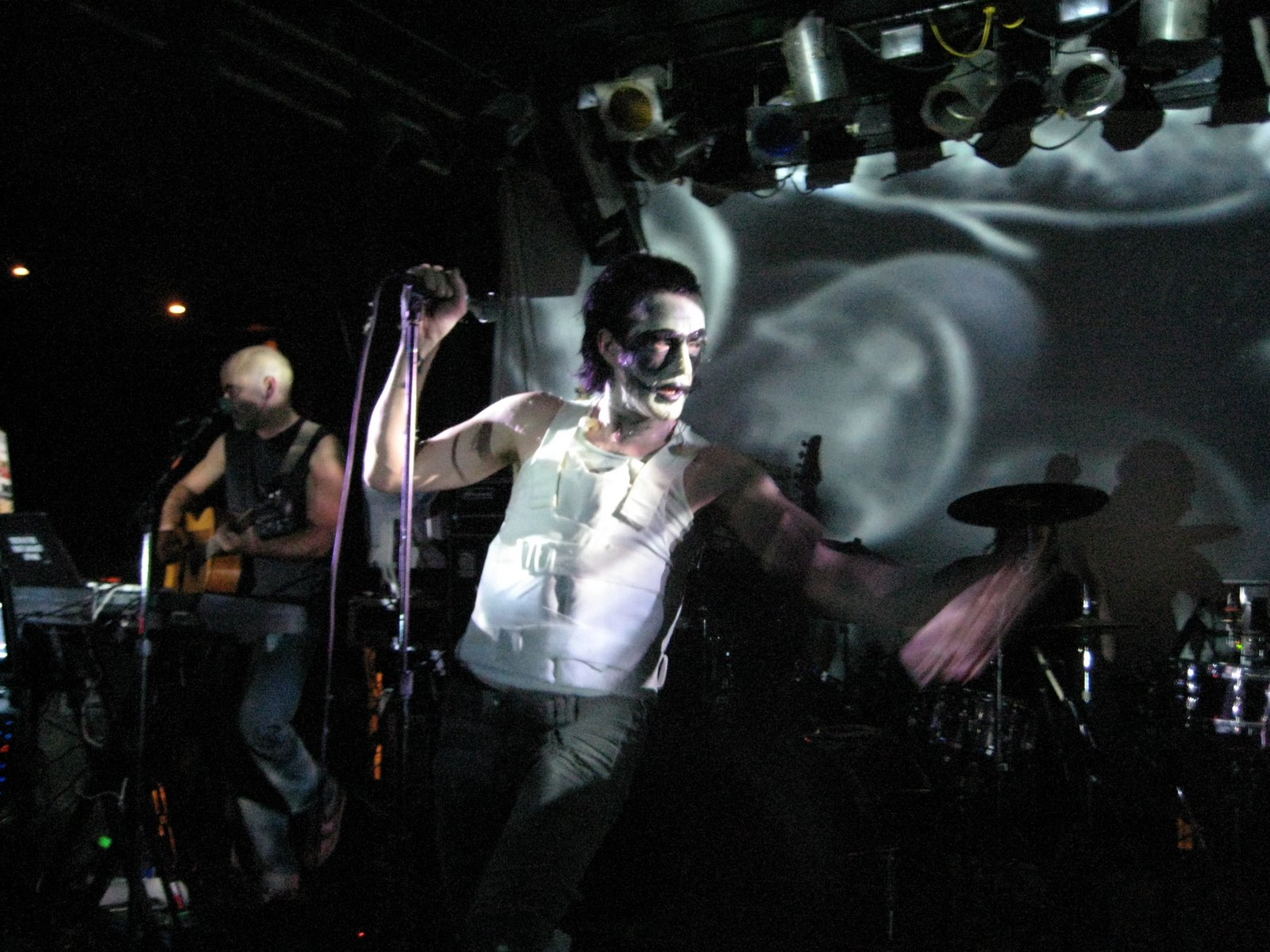
ohGr performing live in Chicago, 2008

Key and Ogre are active in a number of other projects besides Skinny Puppy. Key has released several solo albums including Music for Cats and The Ghost of Each Room in 1998 and 2001, respectively. Doubting Thomas, a project led by Key and the late Dwayne Goettel, was an outlet for mostly instrumental compositions (save for several film and television samples). The projects only releases were Father Don't Cry in 1990 and The Infidel in 1991, both released through Wax Trax! Records. Download was founded by Key and Goettel in 1995 and included the assistance of frequent Skinny Puppy contributors Ken Marshall and Anthony Valcic. The group has released a number of records since its formation and notably provided the soundtrack album Charlie's Family in 1997 for the film The Manson Family, directed by Jim Van Bebber; the film was released six years after the album. Bebber had approached Key to produce the soundtrack, having previously directed several Skinny Puppy videos as well as the short horror film Chunk Blower, which starred Goettel and Bill Leeb of Front Line Assembly. Other notable projects include The Tear Garden with Edward Ka-Spel for The Legendary Pink Dots, platEAU with Phil Western, and Cyberaktif with Goettel and Leeb. Key also works as Scaremeister, his film scoring alter ego, having previously contributed to John Debney's score for End of Days. Scaremeister composed the album 31 Spirits, a collection of short musical pieces which have been used in the trailers of numerous films such as Inglourious Basterds, My Bloody Valentine, and The Book of Eli.

Ogre's main project outside Skinny Puppy is ohGr, which has released five albums, Welt (2001), SunnyPsyOp (2003), Devils in my Details (2008), UnDeveloped (2011), and TrickS (2018). In the mid-nineties, Ogre and producer Martin Atkins created the project known as Rx (formerly known as Ritalin). Rx released only one album, Bedside Toxicology, in 1998. He also toured extensively with Pigface (1991–1995) and Ministry (1987–1990) and appeared on a number of Pigface and Ministry-related recordings.

== Guantanamo Bay torture allegations ==
"VX Gas Attack"
A clip from the bootlegged version of "VX Gas Attack" that was used for torture.

Skinny Puppy accused the US military of using their music to torture inmates at the Guantanamo Bay detention camp, without the band's knowledge or permission. In response, the band sent an "invoice" to the Pentagon.

== Members ==
=== Final line-up ===
- Nivek Ogre – vocals, keyboards (1982–1996, 2000, 2003–2023)
- cEvin Key – guitars, drums, bass, synthesizers (1982–1996, 2000, 2003–2023)
- Mark Walk – keyboards, synthesizers, guitars, bass, drums (2003–2023)

=== Former members ===
- Bill Leeb (Wilhelm Schroeder) – bass synth, backing vocals (1984–1986)
- Dwayne Goettel – keyboards, synthesizers, guitars, bass (1986–1995; died 1995)
- Dave Ogilvie – programming, guitars, production (1987–1988)

=== Touring members ===
- Justin Bennett – drums (2004–2023)
- William Morrison – guitars (2004–2005)
- Matthew Setzer – guitars (2015–2023)

== Discography ==
- Remission (1984)
- Bites (1985)
- Mind: The Perpetual Intercourse (1986)
- Cleanse Fold and Manipulate (1987)
- VIVIsectVI (1988)
- Rabies (1989)
- Too Dark Park (1990)
- Last Rights (1992)
- The Process (1996)
- The Greater Wrong of the Right (2004)
- Mythmaker (2007)
- hanDover (2011)
- Weapon (2013)

== Videography ==
- Ain't It Dead Yet?, 1991, VHS/DVD
  - Live performance at The Concert Hall, Toronto, Ontario, 31 May and 1 June 1987.
- Video Collection (1984-1992), 1996, VHS/DVD
  - Includes videos for "Dig It", "Stairs and Flowers", "Far Too Frail" (live footage 1985), "Smothered Hope" (live footage 1985), "Deep Down Trauma Hounds" (live footage from the 1987 Ain't It Dead Yet? performance), "Testure", "Spasmolytic", and "Killing Game".
- Brap: Back and Forth Series 3 & 4, 1996, 2-CD
  - Includes a number of video clips on those editions which included a CD-ROM portion.
- Greater Wrong of the Right LIVE, 2005, 2-DVD
  - Live performances in Toronto, Ontario, and Montreal, Quebec in late 2004. Also includes videos for "Pro-Test", "Spasmolytic" (live footage 1990), and "Love in Vein" (live footage 1992).
- A number of other, promo-only videos were released, including "State Aid" (live footage 1988), "Worlock" (1990), "Candle" (1996), "Curcible" (1996), "Hardset Head" (1996), and "Haze" (2007).

== See also ==
- Go Ask Ogre
- List of bands from British Columbia
- Music of Vancouver
