= Testure =

Song by Skinny Puppy

Single by Skinny Puppy

from the album VIVIsectVI
- Released: 1989
- Recorded: Mid-1988
- Genre: Synth-pop; electro-industrial; industrial dance
- Length: 23:35 (vinyl and CD versions); 20:51 (mini CD version)
- Label: Nettwerk; Capitol/EMI
- Producers: Dave Ogilvie; cEvin Key

Skinny Puppy singles chronology
"Censor" (1988)	"Testure" (1989)	"Tin Omen" (1989)

Audio sample
- file; help

Professional ratings
Review scores
Source	Rating
AllMusic	3/5 stars

"Testure" is a song by Canadian electro-industrial band Skinny Puppy, taken from its 1988 album VIVIsectVI and released as a single in 1989. "Testure" was the group's first and last song to chart on Billboards's Dance Club Songs, and it was accompanied with a controversial music video.

== Content ==
=== The song ===
Three primary versions of "Testure" exist, two of which appear on the single. The album version of "Testure" is a five-minute track with smooth electronics, fretless bass, and a profusion of samples from Martin Rosen's 1982 film The Plague Dogs. Its lyrics contain both the title of its host album, VIVIsectVI (1988), and the album's main themes: animal rights and testing. See Magazine considered "Testure" to be VIVIsectVI's "centerpiece".

"Testure (S.F. Mix)" shortens the song to four minutes and introduces a greater emphasis on samples from The Plague Dogs. The fretless bass, played by Dale Plevin, is also featured more prominently than on the album version. This mix went on to appear on the band's 1999 compilation album, The Singles Collect, and was used in the song's music video. "Testure (12" Mix)" acts as an extended version of the song, clocking in at eight and a half minutes. This version, remixed and re-edited by Skinny Puppy's own cEvin Key and Dave Ogilvie, also begins with a protracted series of samples from The Plague Dogs. The song's main synthesizer riff does not begin until nearly two minutes in, and Nivek Ogre's vocals are not introduced until the three minute mark. This extended mix appeared on 1990's Twelve Inch Anthology compilation.

"Testure's" title is most likely a play on the words "test" and "torture" intended to equate live animal experimentation to torture.

=== The single ===
Prompted by airplay and club attention, "Testure" was released as a single in 1989, a year after the release of VIVIsectVI. It charted at place nineteen and spent five weeks on Billboards's Dance Club Songs, making it Skinny Puppy's most successful single. Two variations of the release's track listing exist: one with the song "The Second Opinion", and one with "Cage". All versions feature the S.F. and extended mixes of "Testure", and all versions feature "Serpents", a B-side unique to this single.

"Serpents"
"Serpents" showcases Skinny Puppy's percussive experimentation.

"The Second Opinion", which also appeared appended to the end of VIVIsectVI's CD release, includes the line "that machine has got to be destroyed" from Stuart Gordon's 1986 adaptation of H. P. Lovecraft's From Beyond. The song itself is built around a repeating drum machine loop interspersed with modulated and distorted vocal samples. "The Second Opinion" began as a live jam titled "Snub" and was later refined and mixed in studio. "Cage", which originally appeared on Skinny Puppy's 1987 single "Chainsaw", concludes with the line "It's just a little blood... it'll wash out" from William Lustig's 1980 horror film, Maniac. "Serpents" is percussion-focused song that blends programmed industrial beats with tribal drums.

The single's artwork was designed by Steven R. Gilmore, and the back features a large syringe provided by his friend from the University of British Columbia, who also supplied the X-ray images used on VIVIsectVI's artwork.

== Music video ==
"Testure's" music video, directed by Ogre and produced by Gary Blair Smith, begins with a definition of the word vivisection. What follows is the story of a dog-abusing man who, in turn, becomes a test subject operated on and caged by surgeons. Interspersed with the narrative sections are shots of actual animal testing footage from the 1981 documentary The Animals Film and the 1984 PETA film Unnecessary Fuss. According to Ogre and Key, the video was pulled from airplay following an internal poll by Citytv, an associate of Canada's MuchMusic. The poll came out nearly split, but, regardless, the video was ultimately banned by "the powers that be". The video, despite depicting vivisection in "vivid detail", was broadcast on Horizon, the Soviet Union's primary satellite channel, as a critique on materialism.

== Track listing ==
12-inch and CD release
No.	Title	Length
1.	"Testure" (12" mix)	8:34
2.	"Testure" (S.F. mix)	4:04
3.	"The Second Opinion"	5:00
4.	"Serpents"	5:55
Total length:		23:35

Mini CD release
No.	Title	Length
1.	"Testure" (S.F. mix)	4:03
2.	"Testure" (12" mix)	8:32
3.	"Serpents"	5:58
4.	"Cage"	2:18
Total length:		20:51

== Personnel ==
All credits adapted from liner notes

Skinny Puppy

- Nivek Ogre – vocals
- cEvin Key – synthesizers, programming, engineering
- Dwayne Goettel – synthesizers, programming, engineering
- Dave Ogilvie – production, editing

Additional personnel

- Dale Plevin – fretless bass (tracks 1 and 2)
- Sir Arthur – editing (track 1)
- Steven R. Gilmore – artwork

== Chart positions ==
Chart (1989)	Peak position
US Dance Club Songs (Billboard)	19
