= Doomsday Festival =

The Doomsday Festival was a two-day music festival held August 19–20, 2000, at the Ostragehege in Dresden, Germany. The event featured a wide range of bands, but is best known as the occasion of Skinny Puppy's reunion concert, which closed the festival and was recorded for the live album Doomsday: Back and Forth Series 5: Live in Dresden (2001). It was Skinny Puppy's first concert since 1992, first in Europe since 1988, and first ever in the former East Germany. The Sisters of Mercy headlined the first day of the festival.

== Concert line-up ==
=== Day one ===
- Unheilig
- Illuminate
- Zeromancer
- Letzte Instanz
- De/Vision
- In Extremo
- Phillip Boa & The Voodooclub
- Wolfsheim
- The Sisters of Mercy

=== Day two ===
- Accessory
- Philtron
- Velvet Acid Christ
- Terminal Choice
- Covenant
- And One
- Skinny Puppy
