= Spasmolytic (song) =

Song by Skinny Puppy

Single by Skinny Puppy

from the album Too Dark Park
- Released: 1991
- Genre: Electro-industrial
- Length: 31:24
- Label: Nettwerk; Capitol Records
- Songwriter: Skinny Puppy
- Producers: Dave Ogilvie; cEvin Key

Skinny Puppy singles chronology
"Tormentor" (1990)	"Spasmolytic" (1991)	"Inquisition" (1992)

Audio sample
- file; help

Professional ratings
Review scores
Source	Rating
AllMusic	3/5 stars

Spasmolytic is a single by the band Skinny Puppy from the album Too Dark Park. Deftones created a remix of the song that was included on Remix dystemper and the Saw IV soundtrack. At a running time of 31:22, "Spasmolytic" is Skinny Puppy's longest 12-inch single.

The cover art is by Jim Cummins (I, Braineater).

The track "Harsh Stone White", when performed live, featured a backing video that, like the infamous Worlock video, consisted of frightening and graphic scenes from movies. These include The Hunger, Blue Velvet, Day of the Dead, The Thing, Pumpkinhead, 2001: A Space Odyssey, Drugstore Cowboy, The Texas Chainsaw Massacre 2, Dead Ringers, Altered States, Evil Dead II, Brain Damage, Parents, The Fly II, The Cabinet of Dr. Caligari, Galaxy of Terror, and The Serpent and the Rainbow.

== Track listing ==
No.	Title	Length
1.	"Spasmolytic" (Remix)	7:18
2.	"Shore Lined Poison" (Remix)	4:28
3.	"Harsh Stone White" (Live in Denver)	4:53
4.	"Walking on Ice" (Live Excerpts – S.F. – Dallas – O.K.C.)	11:58
5.	"Choralone" (Live in Houston)	2:47
Total length:		31:24

Notes

- Track 5, "Choralone (Live in Houston)", is only listed on the disc itself. Additionally, it is not featured on all CDs or on the vinyl edition.

== Personnel ==
All credits adapted from liner notes.

Skinny Puppy

- Nivek Ogre – vocals
- cEvin Key – synthesizers, programming, engineering, production
- Dwayne Goettel – synthesizers, programming, engineering, production

Additional personnel

- Dave Ogilvie – production, mixing (2–5)
- Anthony Valcic – editing
- Ken Marshall – engineering
- Greg Reely – mixing (2)
- Jim Cummins – artwork
- John Rummen – typography
