= Tin Omen =

Song by Skinny Puppy

Single by Skinny Puppy

from the album Rabies
- Released: 1989
- Recorded: 1989
- Genre: Industrial metal
- Length: 29:01
- Label: Nettwerk; Capitol; EMI
- Songwriter: Skinny Puppy
- Producers: Dave Ogilvie; Al Jourgensen; cEvin Key

Skinny Puppy singles chronology
"Testure" (1989)	"Tin Omen" (1989)	"Worlock" (1990)

Audio sample
- file; help

Professional ratings
Review scores
Source	Rating
AllMusic	2/5 stars

"Tin Omen" is a single by the band Skinny Puppy, taken from their 1989 album Rabies. The song name is a reference to the 1989 Tiananmen Square protests and massacre. The song also refers to the My Lai massacre of 1968 and the Kent State shootings of 1970.

Ministry frontman Al Jourgensen (credited as both Alien Jourgensen and Hypo Luxa) performed guitar and backing vocals for the song. The band's longtime producer Dave "Rave" Ogilvie also contributed additional backing vocals.

== Track listing ==
No.	Title	Length
1.	"Tin Omen"	4:36
2.	"Tin Omen" (Reload)	4:47
3.	"Amputate"	3:14
4.	"Spahn Dirge"	16:22
Total length:		29:01

== Personnel ==
All credits adapted from liner notes.

Skinny Puppy

- Nivek Ogre – vocals
- cEvin Key – synthesizers, programming, production, engineering
- Dwayne Goettel – synthesizers, programming, production, engineering

Additional personnel

- Al Jourgensen – production, engineering, mixing (1, 2), bass, guitar, backing vocals
- Dave Ogilvie – production, engineering, mixing (2, 3, 4)
- Steven R. Gilmore – design, typography
- Greg Sykes – typography
- Marc Ramaer – mixing (1, 2)
