= Censor (song) =

1988 song by Skinny Puppy

"Censor (Dogshit)"

Single by Skinny Puppy

from the album VIVIsectVI
- Released: 1988
- Recorded: mid-1988
- Genre: Electro-industrial
- Length: 22:35
- Label: Nettwerk
- Songwriter(s): Skinny Puppy
- Producer(s): Dave Ogilvie; cEvin Key

Skinny Puppy singles chronology
| "Addiction" (1987) | "Censor (Dogshit)" (1988) | "Testure" (1989) |

Audio sample
- file; help

Professional ratings
Review scores
| Source | Rating |
|---|---|
| AllMusic | 2/5 stars |

"Censor" is a song by Canadian electro-industrial band Skinny Puppy, taken from its 1988 album VIVIsectVI and released as a single in the same year. "Censor's" original title was "Dogshit", which was changed for this release's marketability.

== Content ==
=== The song ===
"Censor" was originally released with the title "Dogshit" as the introductory song off of Skinny Puppy's 1988 album VIVIsectVI. Nettwerk, Skinny Puppy's record label at the time, suggested the change for the single's marketability. The decision to rename the song was ultimately the band's, and the title "Dogshit" still appears on the 12-inch's spine.

Two main versions of "Censor" exist: the four-minute album mix and the ten-minute extended mix, both of which are featured on the single. Musically, the song begins with an extended intro with distorted, looped, and cut up samples. It then transitions into a multilayered blend of programmed industrial beats, fretless bass, and synthesizer sounds all overlaid with Nivek Ogre's enigmatic and intentionally grating vocals. The last third of the song introduces electric guitar and more electronic noise. The extended mix is deliberately sparser than the original version, and it features a number of new sounds and samples. Ogre's vocals do not enter the track until two and a half minutes in.

=== The single ===
Two additional songs originally from the CD versions of VIVIsectVI appear on the "Censor" single. Cofounding member cEvin Key thought of these tracks, "Punk in Park Zoo's" and "Yes He Ran", as a cross between the style of Skinny Puppy the style of some of his side projects, like Doubting Thomas. "Punk in Park Zoo's" is a short and aggressive song that features a different, more abrupt ending than that which appears on the VIVIsectVI compact disc. It is heavily distorted and noisy and was created during a jam when the band took a break from recording "Dogshit". "Yes He Ran" repeatedly employs a sample of Jim Morrison saying "everywhere".

== Track listing ==
| No. | Title | Length |
|---|---|---|
| 1. | "Censor" (Extended Mix) | 9:42 |
| 2. | "Punk in Park Zoo's" | 2:28 |
| 3. | "Yes He Ran" | 6:28 |
| 4. | "Censor" | 3:57 |
| Total length: | | 22:35 |

== Personnel ==
All credits adapted from liner notes.

Skinny Puppy

- Nivek Ogre – vocals
- cEvin Key – synthesizers, programming, engineering
- Dwayne Goettel – synthesizers, programming, engineering
- Dave Ogilvie – production, editing

Additional personnel

- Steven R. Gilmore – artwork
