= Dig It (Skinny Puppy song) =

Song by Skinny Puppy

Single by Skinny Puppy

from the album Mind: The Perpetual Intercourse
- Released: 1986
- Recorded: 1986
- Genre: Post-industrial
- Length: 16:26
- Label: Nettwerk/Capitol/EMI
- Songwriters: Kevin Crompton, Kevin Ogilvie
- Producers: Dave Ogilvie and cEvin Key

Skinny Puppy singles chronology
"Dig It" (1986)	"Chainsaw" (1987)

Audio sample
- file; help

Professional ratings
Review scores
Source	Rating
AllMusic	2/5 stars

"Dig It" is a single by industrial rock band Skinny Puppy, off their 1986 album Mind: The Perpetual Intercourse. Nine Inch Nails frontman Trent Reznor said "Dig It" was a primary influence for the first Nine Inch Nails song, "Down in It".

In 2015, Treble magazine named "Dig It" one of the ten most essential industrial songs to come out of the 80s.

== Track listing ==
No.	Title	Length
1.	"Dig It (12" Version)"	7:24
2.	"The Choke (Re-Grip)"	6:11
3.	"Film" (Only included on the Play It Again Sam 12" release.)	2:51

== Personnel ==
- Nivek Ogre – vocals
- cEvin Key – drums, percussion, keyboards, guitar, bass guitar, synthesizers

=== Guests ===
- D. Rudolph Goettel (gadgetry – 1)

== Notes ==
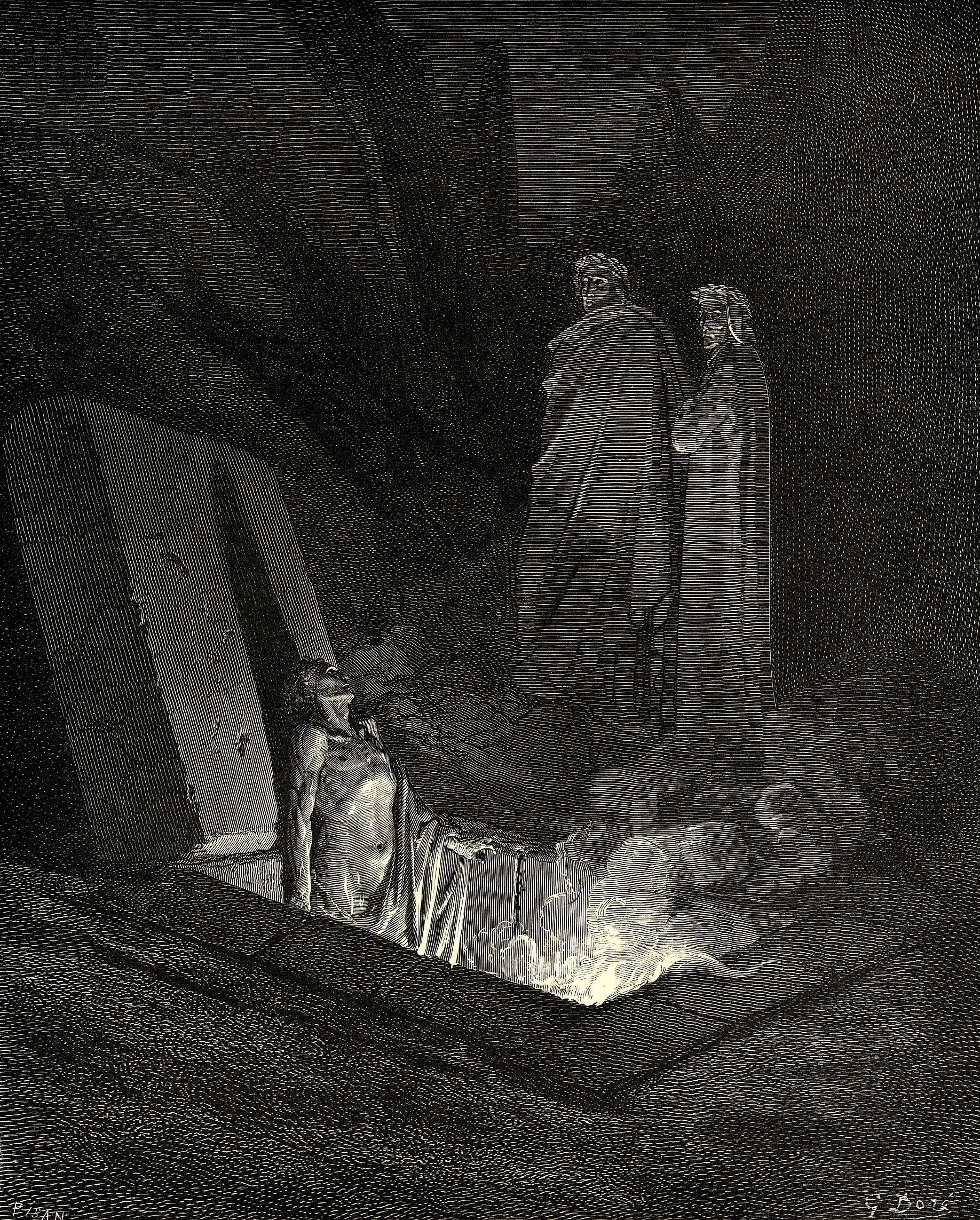
Farinata degli Uberti

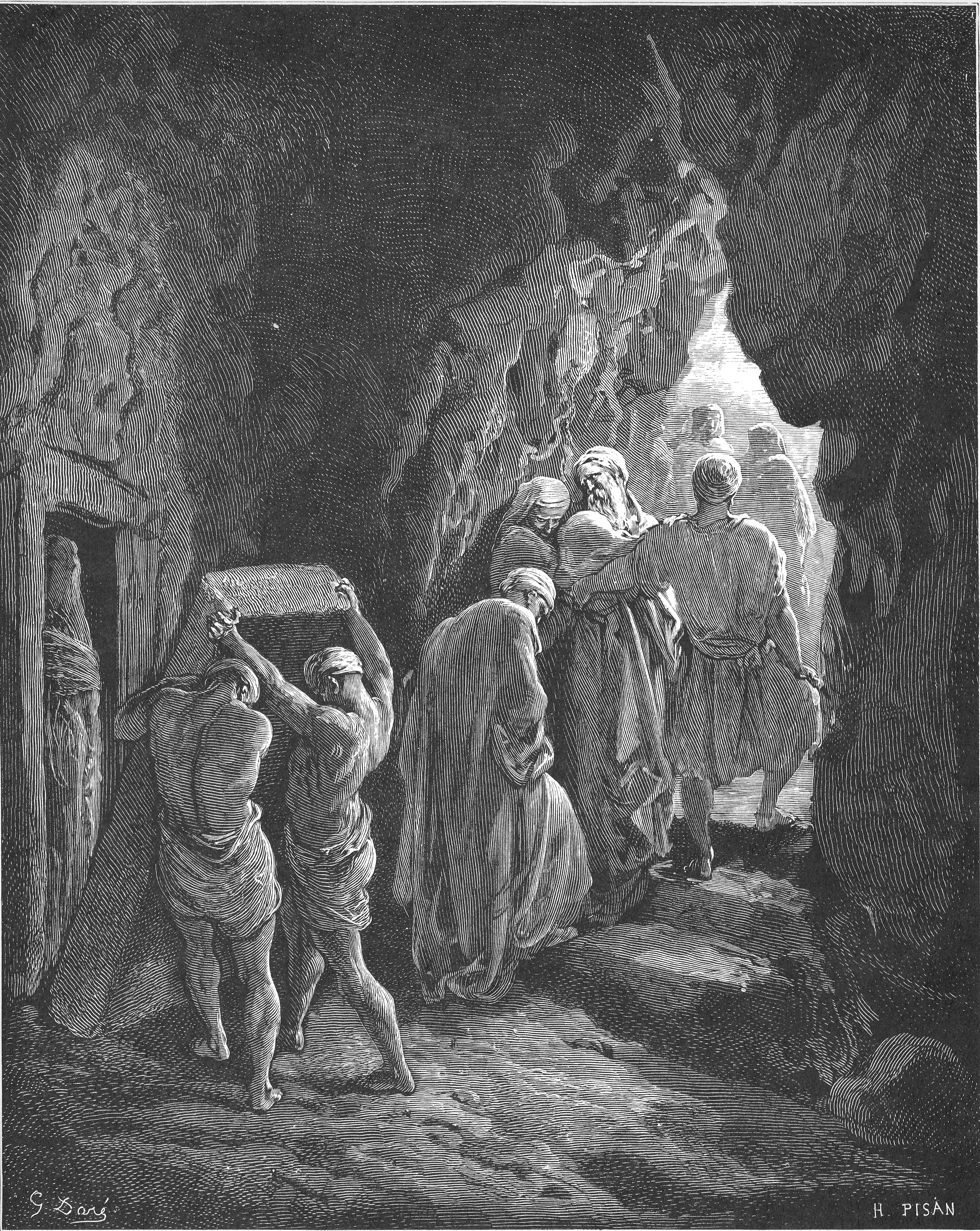
The Burial of Sarah

Etchings by Gustave Doré.
- Engineered by cEvin Key and Dave Ogilvie.
- Sleeve photography, typography and design by Steven R. Gilmore. The cover art itself is a Gustave Doré print from his illustrations for Dante's Inferno. The back cover art is The Burial of Sarah, also by Gustave Doré.
- The song "Dig It" samples the Twilight Zone episode Elegy.

== Video ==
A video was produced for this song. The video begins with cEvin Key in a graveyard with a child. The scene then moves to an office where a man, while working, has a heart attack and dies. In the graveyard Key begins filling in an open grave filled with various office supplies, while this is occurring Ogre is singing a refrain that contains the line, "execute economic slave." The video features a curious style of letterboxing that utilizes the extra space at the top and bottom of the screen with various distorted imagery. MuchMusic banned the video because the bars were perceived as containing subliminal messages.
