= Worlock =

Song by Skinny Puppy

Single by Skinny Puppy

from the album Rabies
- Released: 1990
- Recorded: 1988–1989
- Studio: Vancouver Studios and Chicago Trax Studios
- Genre: Electro-industrial
- Length: 21:28
- Label: Nettwerk; Capitol Records
- Songwriter(s): Skinny Puppy
- Producer(s): Dave Ogilvie; cEvin Key

Skinny Puppy singles chronology
"Tin Omen" (1989)	"Worlock" (1990)	"Tormentor" (1990)

Audio sample
- file; help

Professional ratings
Review scores
Source	Rating
AllMusic	2/5 stars

Worlock is a single by the band Skinny Puppy from the album Rabies. The song uses a sample of the guitars in "Helter Skelter" by The Beatles, as well as a vocal sample of Charles Manson singing the song. Vocalist Nivek Ogre considered it one of the band's better songs.

A mispressed CD release exists that contained Sinéad O'Connor's "The Emperor's New Clothes."

== Music video ==
A video was created for this song that, in part, consisted of many graphic scenes from films, largely of the horror and giallo genres. The films used include: Four Flies on Grey Velvet, Deep Red, Suspiria, Dario Argento's World of Horror, Tenebrae, Combat Shock, Demons, Phenomena, Opera, The Beyond, Hellraiser, Hellbound: Hellraiser II, Bad Taste, Dead & Buried, Luther The Geek, Maniac Cop, Henry: Portrait of a Serial Killer, Phantasm II, From Beyond, Re-Animator, Parents, Death Warmed Up, Hidden Crimes, Intruder, Dune, Eraserhead, and Altered States.

The X-rated version opens with a transmission sound from Videodrome.

== Track listing ==
No.	Title	Length
1.	"Worlock (Ed)"	6:42
2.	"Worlock (LP mix)"	5:00
3.	"Tin Omen 1"	4:46
4.	"Brak Talk"	5:00
Total length:		21:28

== Personnel ==
All credits adapted from liner notes.

Skinny Puppy

- Nivek Ogre – vocals
- cEvin Key – synthesizers, programming, engineering, production
- Dwayne Goettel – synthesizers, programming, engineering, production, editing

Additional personnel

- Dave Ogilvie – production, editing
- Marc Ramaer – mixing (2, 3)
- Steven R. Gilmore – artwork
