= Addiction (Skinny Puppy song) =

Song by Skinny Puppy

Single by Skinny Puppy

from the album Cleanse Fold and Manipulate
- Released: 1987
- Recorded: 1987
- Genre: Industrial
- Length: 6:01
- Label: Nettwerk/Capitol/EMI
- Songwriters: Kevin Crompton, Dwayne Goettel, Kevin Ogilvie
- Producers: Dave Ogilvie and cEvin Key

Skinny Puppy singles chronology
"Stairs & Flowers" (1987)	"Addiction" (1987)	"Censor" (1988)

Audio sample
- file; help

Professional ratings
Review scores
Source	Rating
AllMusic	2/5 stars

"Addiction" is a song by the band Skinny Puppy, taken from their 1987 album Cleanse Fold and Manipulate. It was released on vinyl in 1987 and released on CD in 1991 (Canada) and 1997 (United States). The lyrics of the song quote the 19th century Gothic novel Melmoth the Wanderer by Charles Maturin.

== Track listing ==
No.	Title	Length
1.	"Addiction (1st Dose)"	8:26
2.	"Addiction (2nd Dose)"	6:01
3.	"Deep Down Trauma Hounds (Remix)"	7:35

== Personnel ==
- Nivek Ogre
- cEvin Key
- Dwayne Goettel

=== Other ===
- Addition production on track 1 by Greg Reely, with additional engineering by Adrian Sherwood. Edited by Greg Reely.
- Additional production and engineering on track 2–3 by Adrian Sherwood. Assisted by Steve Spapperi. Edited by Adrian Sherwood.
- Recorded at Mushroom and Chicago Trax. Mastered by Pete Norman.

== Notes ==
- Engineered by cEvin Key and Dave Ogilvie.
- Sleeve photography, typography and design by Steven R. Gilmore.
