= Dave Ogilvie =

Canadian record producer and musician

- Also known as: Rave
- Born: David Denton Ogilvie; 1960 (age 65–66); Montreal, Québec, Canada
- Origin: Vancouver, British Columbia, Canada
- Genres: Industrial; alternative rock; pop
- Occupations: Musician; producer; mixer
- Instruments: Guitar; keyboards; vocals
- Years active: 1982–present
- Formerly of: Skinny Puppy; Hilt; Jakalope

Dave "Rave" Ogilvie is a Canadian record producer, mixer, songwriter and musician based in Vancouver.

Ogilvie started his recording career as a mixing engineer at Mushroom Studios. He frequently collaborated with industrial band Skinny Puppy as both a band member and producer. He also worked as a producer, engineer and mixer on several projects with Trent Reznor of Nine Inch Nails, including engineering and remixing NIN singles, co-producing Marilyn Manson's album Antichrist Superstar and remixing David Bowie's single "I'm Afraid of Americans".

Over his career he has worked with such artists as Loverboy, 54-40, SNFU, Ministry, Carly Rae Jepsen, Rob Halford and Mötley Crüe. He founded his own industrial pop band, Jakalope, in 2003.

== Career ==
=== Early career ===
Born in Montreal, Ogilvie attended the music program at a local college where he took classes taught by audio engineer Lindsay Kidd. Kidd left his teaching job to work in Vancouver and Ogilvie followed months later, acquiring a job at Mushroom Studios in 1984, eventually working as an assistant to producer Bruce Fairbairn.

His early work included assisting Kidd with the engineering of the album Worlds Away (1982) by Strange Advance and the Images in Vogue's EP Educated Man (1982). He assisted with the recording of Keep It Up (1983) by Loverboy, which was produced by Fairbairn and whose chief engineer was Bob Rock.

Amongst other artists, he continued to work with Images In Vogue, engineering their self-titled EP released in 1983, followed by their EP Rituals (1984), and their full-length album In the House (1985). Ogilvie's first work as a solo-producer was on 54-40's self-titled major label debut album, released in 1986. He also engineered the tracks "Breathe" and "Faith Collapsing" on the 1989 album The Mind Is A Terrible Thing To Taste by Ministry.

=== Work with Skinny Puppy and Trent Reznor ===
Images in Vogue band-member, Kevin Crompton (later known as cEvin Key), invited Ogilvie to provide recording and mixing work on his new project, industrial band Skinny Puppy. Ogilvie co-produced Skinny Puppy's 1984 record label debut EP Remission, which is one of the first known commercial releases to use a TR-909 drum machine. Ogilvie contributed to all of Skinny Puppy's releases until their 1996 album The Process, after which the band went on hiatus for several years. During his tenure with Skinny Puppy, Ogilvie was at times listed as a member of the band in album liner notes and toured with the band. He also worked with Key on his side project Hilt. While Ogilvie shares a surname with Skinny Puppy frontman, Kevin Ogilvie (aka Nivek Ogre), the two are not related.

Ogilvie's work with Skinny Puppy brought him to the attention of Trent Reznor of Nine Inch Nails, who invited Ogilvie to co-produce and engineer Marilyn Manson's Antichrist Superstar (1996). He worked with Reznor on remixes of David Bowie's single "I'm Afraid of Americans" (1997), and co-produced the album Voyeurs (1998) by Rob Halford's band Two. Ogilvie also engineered tracks on Nine Inch Nails' The Fragile (1999).

=== Jakalope ===
Ogilvie formed the industrial pop band Jakalope in 2003. He met the band's first vocalist Katie B at The Warehouse Studio where she worked as a receptionist. Reznor produced, wrote and played on several tracks of their first album It Dreams (2004) and co-produced their second album Born 4 (2006). The band's third album, Things That Go Jump in the Night (2010), featured musician Chrystal Leigh on vocals.

=== Other mixing and production work ===
Ogilvie mixed Sloan's studio album debut Smeared (1992). He remixed Mötley Crüe's 1994 single "Hooligan's Holiday" and the band's 1997 single "Afraid". He also produced the albums The One Voted Most Likely to Succeed (1995) and FYULABA (1996) by SNFU.

Since the 2010s, Ogilvie's work has increasingly ventured into the pop market, partly due to his ongoing collaborations with Josh Ramsay, a producer and lead vocalist of the pop band Marianas Trench. His work with Ramsay including the mixing of Carly Rae Jepsen's 2011 hit single "Call Me Maybe". Ogilvie also produced tracks on the Marianas Trench album Masterpiece Theatre (2009), and mixed tracks on Ever After (2011), Astoria, and Haven (2024).

Ogilvie produced Men Without Hats' 2012 album Love in the Age of War, mixed two tracks on Avril Lavigne's 2013 self-titled album, and produced The Birthday Massacre's 2017 release Walking with Strangers.

He was nominated for Producer of the Year at the Western Canadian Music Awards in 2011.
