= List of songs recorded by Skinny Puppy =

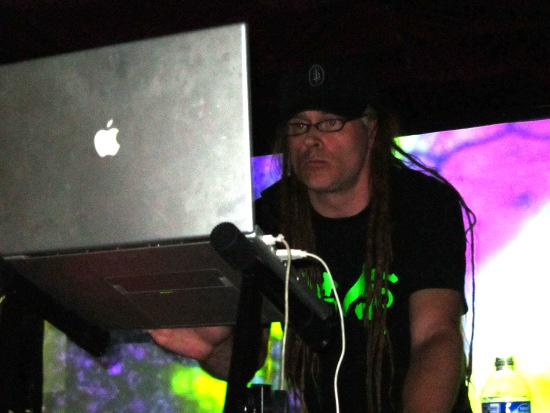
Skinny Puppy performing in the 2010s. Top to bottom: Nivek Ogre and cEvin Key

The Canadian electro-industrial band Skinny Puppy has recorded many original songs, remixes, demos, outtakes, and improvisations. They appear listed below.

== Studio songs and in-house remixes ==
Key
†	Indicates a single release
↓	Indicates an in-house remix
‡	Indicates a song with a music video

Name of song, length, original release, and year released
Song	Length	Original release	Year	Ref(s).	Note(s)
"200 Years"	4:45	Mind: The Perpetual Intercourse	1986		
"A.M. / Meat Flavour"	1:50	Back & Forth	1984		
"Addiction" †	6:01	Cleanse Fold and Manipulate	1987		
"Addiction" (Dog House Mix) ↓	7:23	Nettwerk Sound Sampler Volume Two – A Food for Thought	1988		
"Addiction" (First Dose) ↓	8:26	"Addiction"	1987		
"Addiction" (Second Dose) ↓	6:01	"Addiction"	1987		
"Ambiantz"	4:27	Mythmaker	2007		(Note: An instrumental version of this song was released on a promotional CD in 2007.)
"Amnesia"	4:20	The Process	1996		
"Amputate"	3:15	Rabies	1989		
"Anger"	4:53	Cleanse Fold and Manipulate	1987		(Note: Some of this song's percussion was recorded on metal and plastic barrels in a reverb chamber.)
"Antagonism"	5:03	Mind: The Perpetual Intercourse	1986		
"Ashas"	3:30	Handover	2011		
"Assimilate" ‡	6:56	Bites	1985		
"Assimilate" (R23 Mix) ↓	6:32	"Chainsaw"	1987		
"Bark"	4:40	"Tormentor"	1990		
"Basement"	3:25	Bites	1985		
"Blood on the Wall"	2:58	Bites	1985		
"Blue Serge"	5:13	The Process	1996		(Note: This song was one of Key's first experiments with a modular synthesizer.)
"Brak Talk"	4:59	"Worlock"	1990		
"Brap..."	1:10	Remission	1984		(Note: This song was released with the title "...Brap" on reissues of Remission.)
"Brownstone"	3:28	Handover	2011		
"Burnt with Water"	7:41	Mind: The Perpetual Intercourse	1986		
"Cage"	2:21	"Chainsaw"	1987		(Note: This is one of only a few Skinny Puppy songs co-written by Bill Leeb of Front Line Assembly.)
"Candle" † ‡	4:58	The Process	1996		
"Candle" (Edit) ↓	3:19	"Candle"	1996		
"Cellar Heat"	0:59	The Process	1996		
"Censor" (Extended Mix) ↓	9:42	"Censor"	1988		(Note: This an extended remix of the song "Dogshit" from VIVIsectVI.)
"The Centre Bullet"	9:42	Bites	1993		(Note: This song was also released on The Tear Garden's 1986 self-titled EP as "The Center Bullet".)
"Chainsaw" †	5:54	"Chainsaw"	1987		(Note: Though originally a non-album single, "Chainsaw" was, starting in 1988, included as a bonus track on CD reissues of Mind: The Perpetual Intercourse.)
"The Choke"	6:29	Bites	1985		
"The Choke" (Re-Grip) ↓	6:12	"Dig It"	1987		
"Choralone"	3:02	Rabies	1989		
"Christianity"	1:32	Bites	1985		
"Church"	3:16	Bites	1985		
"Circustance"	4:36	Last Rights	1992		(Note: Several Skinny Puppy songs feature altered, stylized, or deliberately misspelled names. This is an example.)
"Convulsion"	3:20	Too Dark Park	1990		
"Cullorblind"	5:48	Handover	2011		
"Cult"	3:03	The Process	1996		
"Curcible" ‡	3:28	The Process	1996		
"DaddyuWarbash"	3:18	The Greater Wrong of the Right	2004		
"Dal"	4:45	Mythmaker	2007		
"Dead Doll"	2:28	Bites	1993		
"Dead Lines"	6:13	Bites	1985		(Note: This was one of the final two songs recorded for Bites.)
"Dead of Winter"	7:15	Back & Forth	1984		
"Death"	3:56	The Process	1996		
"Deep Down Trauma Hounds" ‡	4:41	Cleanse Fold and Manipulate	1987		
"Deep Down Trauma Hounds" (Remix) ↓	7:35	"Addiction"	1987		
"Dig It" † ‡	6:03	Mind: The Perpetual Intercourse	1986		(Note: On CD issues of Mind: The Perpetual Intercourse, this is replaced by the song's 12-inch remix.)
"Dig It" (12" Version) ↓	7:24	"Dig It"	1987		
"Dig It" (Short Edit) ↓	5:06	The Singles Collect	1999		
"Dogshit" †	3:55	VIVIsectVI	1988		(Note: This song was released as a single under the title "Censor". Its extended remix also carries the changed name.)
"Download"	11:01	Last Rights	1992		(Note: This song was introduced as the closing track of Last Rights after "Left Handshake" was pulled for copyright concerns. It is an especially experimental track derived almost exclusively from manipulated samples. Dwayne Goettel and cEvin Key would go on to continue this type of experimentation on their side project Download.)
"Downsizer"	4:20	The Greater Wrong of the Right	2004		
"Draining Faces"	5:12	Cleanse Fold and Manipulate	1987		(Note: This song appeared on the soundtrack of the 1999 horror film The Blair Witch Project.)
"Edge of Sanity"	1:30	Back & Forth	1984		
"Empte"	4:11	The Greater Wrong of the Right	2004		
"Epilogue"	1:12	Cleanse Fold and Manipulate	1987		
"Falling"	4:20	Bites	1993		
"Far Too Frail" ‡	3:42	Remission	1984		
"Fascist Jock Itch"	4:58	Rabies	1989		
"Film"	2:18	Bites	1985		
"First Aid"	4:29	Cleanse Fold and Manipulate	1987		
"Fritter (Stella's Home)"	3:31	VIVIsectVI	1988		
"Funguss"	4:05	VIVIsectVI	1988		
"Gambatte"	3:25	Handover	2011		
"Ghostman"	4:55	The Greater Wrong of the Right	2004		
"Glass Houses"	3:24	Remission	1984		
"Glass Out"	3:25	Remission	1985		
"Glowbel"	3:15	Weapon	2013		
"God's Gift (Maggot)"	4:46	Mind: The Perpetual Intercourse	1986		
"Goneja"	5:25	The Greater Wrong of the Right	2004		
"Grave Wisdom"	3:45	Too Dark Park	1990		
"Hardset Head" ‡	4:06	The Process	1996		
"Harsh Stone White"	4:29	VIVIsectVI	1988		
"Haunted"	9:05	Industrial Revolution: 3rd Edition Rare & Unreleased	1996		
"Haunted" (Edit)	4:54	The Very Best of Industrial Revolution	2000		
"Haze" ‡	5:28	Mythmaker	2007		
"Hexonxonx"	5:24	Rabies	1989		
"Hospital Waste"	4:37	VIVIsectVI	1988		
"Human Disease (S.K.U.M.M.)"	6:18	VIVIsectVI	1988		
"I'mmortal"	4:16	The Greater Wrong of the Right	2004		
"Icebreaker"	3:14	Bites	1985		(Note: Some releases list this song as "Ice Breaker".)
"Icktums"	5:16	Handover	2011		
"Illisit" ‡	3:57	Weapon	2013		
"Incision"	4:41	Remission	1985		
"Inquisition" †	5:17	Last Rights	1992		
"Inquisition" (Extended Mix) ↓	7:05	"Inquisition"	1992		
"Inquisition" (Single Mix) ↓	4:26	"Inquisition"	1992		
"Jaher"	5:14	Mythmaker	2007		
"K-9"	3:37	Back & Forth	1984		
"Killing Game" ‡	3:48	Last Rights	1992		
"Knowhere?"	4:18	Last Rights	1992		
"Lahuman8"	4:32	"Inquisition"	1992		(Note: This song was commissioned by the contemporary dance group La La La Human Steps. Other tracks (a version of "Riverz End" and a cover of a song from West Side Story) were intended for the project, but the deal fell through.)
"Last Call"	5:54	Bites	1985		
"Left Handshake" †	4:39	Brap: Back and Forth Series 3 & 4	1996		(Note: This song was originally created as the closing track of 1992's Last Rights, but it was pulled from the album due to copyright concerns with a sample. It was released in 2000 as a limited single under the name "Track 10".)
"Lestiduz"	4:11	Mythmaker	2007		
"Love in Vein"	5:35	Last Rights	1992		
"Love in Vein" (Remix) ↓	6:57	Brap: Back and Forth Series 3 & 4	1996		(Note: This remix was intended to appear on a 12-inch release of "Love in Vein", but the single never came to fruition.)
"Love"	1:51	Bites	1985		(Note: This song later appeared on Mind: The Perpetual Intercourse as a core track.)
"Lust Chance"	3:54	Last Rights	1992		
"Magnifishit"	4:31	Mythmaker	2007		
"Manwhole"	1:44	Remission	1985		
"Melt"	4:17	Paradigm Shift	1997		
"Mirror Saw"	3:51	Last Rights	1992		
"Mirror Saw" (Dub Mix) ↓	5:32	"Inquisition"	1992		
"Morpheus Laughing"	4:00	Too Dark Park	1990		
"Morter"	4:39	The Process	1996		
"The Mourn"	2:41	Cleanse Fold and Manipulate	1987		
"Nature's Revenge"	3:57	Too Dark Park	1990		
"Nature's Revenge" (Dub) ↓	5:09	"Tormentor"	1990		
"Neuwerld"	5:28	The Greater Wrong of the Right	2004		
"Noisex"	7:14	Handover	2011		
"Ode to Groovy"	2:54	In Defense of Animals – A Benefit Compilation	1993		(Note: Despite being credited to Skinny Puppy, only Nivek Ogre and Dave Ogilvie are writers (leaving out the two main instrumentalists of the band, cEvin Key and Dwayne Goettel).)
"One Day"	4:20	Bites	1993		(Note: This song appears as a hidden track on the 1993 reissue of Bites.)
"One Time One Place"	5:41	Mind: The Perpetual Intercourse	1986		
"Optimissed"	3:49	Underworld – Music from the Motion Picture	2003		
"Overdose"	2:09	Weapon	2013		(Note: This hidden track is a previously unreleased song from the Remission and Bites era that the band retouched for Weapon.)
"Ovirt"	4:51	Handover	2011		
"Paragun"	4:52	Weapon	2013		
"Past Present"	6:27	The Greater Wrong of the Right	2004		
"Pasturn"	3:48	Mythmaker	2007		
"Pedafly"	5:37	Mythmaker	2007		
"The Pit"	3:22	Back & Forth	1984		
"Plasicage"	3:13	Weapon	2013		
"Point"	3:38	Handover	2011		
"Politikil" †	4:22	Mythmaker	2007		
"Politikil" (Extended Mix) ↓	5:59	Mythmaker	2007		
"Pro-test" ‡	5:29	The Greater Wrong of the Right	2004		
"Process"	5:02	The Process	1996		
"Punk in Park Zoo's"	2:30	VIVIsectVI	1988		
"Quiet Solitude"	4:45	Back & Forth	1984		
"Rain"	1:26	Rabies	1989		
"Rash Reflection"	3:28	Too Dark Park	1990		
"Reclamation"	3:00	Too Dark Park	1990		
"Rivers"	4:48	Rabies	1989		
"Riverz End"	6:40	Last Rights	1992		
"Rodent"	5:48	Rabies	1989		
"Salvo"	3:45	Weapon	2013		
"Scrapyard"	3:54	Last Rights	1992		
"The Second Opinion"	4:59	VIVIsectVI	1988		
"Second Tooth"	4:06	Cleanse Fold and Manipulate	1987		
"Serpents"	5:55	"Testure"	1989		
"Shadow Cast"	4:18	Cleanse Fold and Manipulate	1987		
"Shore Lined Poison"	4:49	Too Dark Park	1990		
"Shore Lined Poison" (Remix) ↓	4:28	"Spasmolytic"	1991		
"Sleeping Beast"	5:46	Back & Forth	1984		
"Smothered Hope" ‡	5:14	Remission	1984		(Note: This song has been performed live by industrial metal band Ministry with Skinny Puppy vocalist Nivek Ogre as a guest; one such recording was released on the 1989 single "Burning Inside".)
"Smothered Hope" (Ogre and Mark Walk Remix) ↓	3:33	Remix Dystemper	1998		
"Social Deception"	2:57	Bites	1985		
"Solvent"	4:37	Remission	1984		
"Solvent"	4:37	Weapon	2013		(Note: This is a rerecording of the song of the same name from the EP Remission.)
"Spasmolytic" † ‡	3:53	Too Dark Park	1990		
"Spasmolytic" (Remix) ↓	7:18	"Spasmolytic"	1991		
"Spasmolytic" (Video Edit) ↓	4:49	Herd This?	1991		
"Stairs and Flowers" † ‡	5:17	Mind: The Perpetual Intercourse	1986		
"Stairs and Flowers" (Def Wish Mix) ↓	6:05	"Chainsaw"	1986		
"Stairs and Flowers" (Too Far Gone) ↓	6:35	"Chainsaw"	1986		(Note: Some releases list this song as "Stairs and Flowers" (Dub).)
"State Aid"	3:54	VIVIsectVI	1988		
"Survivalisto"	4:50	Weapon	2013		
"T.F.W.O."	3:47	Too Dark Park	1990		(Note: This song has been performed live by industrial rock supergroup Pigface with Skinny Puppy vocalist Nivek Ogre as a guest; one such recording was released on the 1991 live album Welcome to Mexico... Asshole.)
"Tear or Beat"	4:42	Cleanse Fold and Manipulate	1987		
"Terminal"	4:00	Weapon	2013		
"Testure" † ‡	5:06	VIVIsectVI	1988		
"Testure" (12" Mix) ↓	8:34	"Testure"	1989		
"Testure" (S.F. Mix) ↓	4:04	"Testure"	1989		
"Three Blind Mice"	3:08	Mind: The Perpetual Intercourse	1986		
"Tin Omen"	4:36	Rabies	1989		
"Tin Omen 1" ↓	4:46	"Worlock"	1990		
"Tin Omen" (Reload) ↓	4:47	"Tin Omen"	1989		
"Tomorrow"	4:53	Bites	1985		
"Tormentor" †	4:33	Too Dark Park	1990		
"Tormentor" (Ext. Re Edit) ↓	7:38	"Tormentor"	1990		
"Tsudanama"	5:53	Weapon	2013		
"Two Time Grime"	5:38	Rabies	1989		
"Ugli"	6:33	Mythmaker	2007		
"Use Less"	4:47	The Greater Wrong of the Right	2004		
"Village"	4:09	Handover	2011		
"VX Gas Attack"	5:36	VIVIsectVI	1988		
"Vyrisus"	4:07	Handover	2011		
"Wavy"	4:34	Handover	2011		
"Who's Laughing Now?"	5:28	VIVIsectVI	1988		
"Worlock" † ‡	5:30	Rabies	1989		
"Worlock" (Ed) ↓	6:42	"Worlock"	1990		
"Wornin'"	4:42	Weapon	2013		
"Yes He Ran"	6:28	VIVIsectVI	1988		

== Studio improvisations, demos, and outtakes ==
Key
#	Indicates a song with vocals (Note: Many of these songs contain spoken samples, but this category only indicates tracks with vocals by Nivek Ogre.)

Name of song, length, original release, and year released
Song	Length	Original release	Year	Ref(s).	Note(s)
"All in Her Mind"	3:09	Back & Forth Vol7	2007		(Note: This song is either an outtake or a demo recorded between 1991 and 1995, spanning the Last Rights and The Process eras.)
"Ambient Fruit"	7:04	Back and Forth 06Six	2003		(Note: This song was originally recorded in 1985 for Hell-o-Deathday, a defunct side project of Nivek Ogre and cEvin Key formed to open for Chris & Cosey.) (Note: A sequel to this song, "Ambient Fruit (Chapter 2)", was released on the Skinny Puppy side project The Dragon Experience in 2003.)
"Assimilate" (Original Inst. Demo)	3:04	Back and Forth Series Two	1992		
"Blood"	5:12	Back & Forth Vol7	2007		
"Brak Yaletown"	5:52	Back and Forth 06Six	2003		(Note: This in-studio improvisation was recorded in 1983.)
"Brassy Excellence"	4:02	Back and Forth 06Six	2003		(Note: This demo was recorded in early 1989.)
"Carry"	5:18	Brap: Back and Forth Series 3 & 4	1996		
"Cast Iron Bathtub"	2:35	Back & Forth Vol7	2007		(Note: This song is built around and expanded from the sample at the beginning of "Death" from The Process.)
"Cauldron of Sorrow"	3:34	Back & Forth Vol7	2007		
"Chromadog"	2:03	Brap and Forth Vol. 8	2018		(Note: This demo was recorded in 1984 for Remission.)
"Coma"	3:26	Brap and Forth Vol. 8	2018		(Note: This 1984 demo was one of the first Skinny Puppy songs to experiment with samples, which would become a staple for the band. "Coma" samples Alfred Hitchcock's 1943 film Shadow of a Doubt.)
"Crazy Tonight"	4:12	Encore	2003		(Note: This song is an in-studio improvisational jam recorded in 1990.)
"Dead Doll" (Demo) #	2:17	Brap: Back and Forth Series 3 & 4	1996		
"Deadlines" (Demo)	4:42	Brap: Back and Forth Series 3 & 4	1996		
"Disco Infernal" (Raw Candle) #	5:24	Back & Forth Vol7	2007		
"Don't Look Behind Your Eyes"	1:50	Brap and Forth Vol. 8	2018		(Note: This song was recorded in 1984.)
"Doobie Drive"	3:55	Brap and Forth Vol. 8	2018		
"Double Cross"	5:31	Brap: Back and Forth Series 3 & 4	1996		
"Elements"	6:00	Unreleased	2007		(Note: This demo was originally recorded during the session for The Greater Wrong of the Right and was played on a radio interview with a musician involved with the track's creation.)
"Empire"	3:57	Rare	2007		(Note: This song was recorded in 1983.)
"First Night in Malibu"	1:07	Back & Forth Vol7	2007		
"Floating"	3:43	Brap and Forth Vol. 8	2018		(Note: This 1985 outtake was recorded for the side project The Dragon Experience.)
"Flyz"	3:05	Brap and Forth Vol. 8	2018		
"Grave Wisdom" (Alternative Mix) #	3:42	Decadence	1995		(Note: Though not described as such in the liner notes of Decadence, this track is labeled "Alternative Mix" on its exterior packaging.) (Note: This song also appeared on Brap: Back and Forth Series 3 & 4 a year after this release. There it was accompanied with two other Too Dark Park-era alternative mixes.)
"Guilty"	3:13	Brap: Back and Forth Series 3 & 4	1996		
"Hatekilll" (V2 Extended Version) #	8:36	Back and Forth 06Six	2003		(Note: This demo, recorded in 1994, is one of twelve versions of "Hatekilll".)
"Home Bass"	4:12	Brap and Forth Vol. 8	2018		(Note: This track in a 1984 outtake from Back & Forth.)
"Hud" (Amnesia Odd) #	4:17	Back & Forth Vol7	2007		
"Incandescent Glow"	3:33	Brap and Forth Vol. 8	2018		
"Interview"	1:03	Back and Forth 06Six	2003		(Note: This is a recording of a 1985 radio interview with members of Skinny Puppy. The audio has been manipulated and distorted.)
"Its History" #	5:08	Back & Forth Vol7	2007		
"Jackhammer"	4:18	Brap: Back and Forth Series 3 & 4	1996		
"Jam Brak"	9:35	Brap and Forth Vol. 8	2018		(Note: This in-studio improvisation was recorded by cEvin Key and Bill Leeb in 1983.)
"Kstorm"	6:49	Back & Forth Vol7	2007		
"Liferamp"	4:20	Brap and Forth Vol. 8	2018		(Note: This track was recorded in 2001, just a year after Skinny Puppy's reformation.)
"Meat Flavoured Factor"	6:39	Back and Forth 06Six	2003		(Note: This song, recorded in December 1982, was the first made under the Skinny Puppy name.)
"Mindfuck 17" #	1:49	Back & Forth Vol7	2007		
"Monster Radio Man"	2:22	Back and Forth Series Two	1992		
"Morphedus" #	5:43	We Came to Dance – Indie Dancefloor Vol. 10	1997		
"Morphous" (Demo Version) #	4:12	Back & Forth Vol7	2007		
"Morphous" (V2) #	5:12	Back and Forth 06Six	2003		(Note: This demo, recorded in 1994, is one of seven versions of "Morphous".)
"My Voice Sounds Like Shit" #	2:28	Back and Forth Series Two	1992		
"Nature's Revenge" (Alternative Mix) #	3:58	Brap: Back and Forth Series 3 & 4	1996		
"Pathway"	6:03	Brap and Forth Vol. 8	2018		
"The Poison Mouth" #	3:58	Back and Forth 06Six	2003		(Note: This song was recorded in 1993 during experimentation with a Serge synthesizer. It was the first Skinny Puppy song with Mark Walk involved. It was originally discarded and had to be recovered and pieced together from several sources of varying quality.)
"Process²"	1:52	Back & Forth Vol7	2007		
"Puppy Gristle" #	40:11	Puppy Gristle	2002		(Note: This piece is an in-studio improvisational jam recorded in November 1993. It features, alongside Skinny Puppy, Genesis P-Orridge of Throbbing Gristle and Larry Thrasher of Psychic TV.)
"Remember Ash"	3:29	Brap and Forth Vol. 8	2018		(Note: This demo recorded for Bites was one of the first Skinny Puppy songs created with a focus on percussion and eerie production.)
"Scared"	2:13	Back and Forth 06Six	2003		
"Schrimpz"	3:56	Back and Forth 06Six	2003		(Note: This demo was recorded in 1988.)
"Scrappy Brappy"	2:02	Brap and Forth Vol. 8	2018		(Note: This track is subtitled "remnant slice 1984".)
"Scratch Brap"	3:29	Brap and Forth Vol. 8	2018		(Note: This in-studio improvisational jam was recorded in 1988.)
"Severed Puppy"	2:26	Brap and Forth Vol. 8	2018		(Note: This home demo was recorded in 1985.)
"Smothered Hope" (Demo) #	7:21	Back and Forth Series Two	1992		(Note: This demo is preceded by a two-minute untitled improvisational jam.)
"Sniper"	2:20	Brap and Forth Vol. 8	2018		
"Sore in a Masterpiece / Dead of Winter" #	13:44	Back and Forth Series Two	1992		(Note: The second act of this song, "Dead of Winter", was previously released as a standalone piece on Back & Forth.)
"The Soul That Creates" #	4:03	Brap: Back and Forth Series 3 & 4	1996		
"Spahn Dirge" #	16:23	Rabies	1989		(Note: This song is an in-studio improvisational jam included on CD issues of Rabies as well as on the "Tin Omen" single.)
"Sparkless" #	3:01	Brap: Back and Forth Series 3 & 4	1996		
"Spasmolytic" (Alternative Mix) #	3:54	Brap: Back and Forth Series 3 & 4	1996		
"Splasher"	3:51	Brap: Back and Forth Series 3 & 4	1996		
"Sters 150"	4:10	Back & Forth Vol7	2007		
"Subskull"	4:33	Back and Forth 06Six	2003		(Note: This demo was recorded in 1992.)
"This Is Your Terror"	2:18	Back & Forth Vol7	2007		
"Those Loud Neighbours"	5:58	Back & Forth Vol7	2007		
"To a Baser Nature"	2:51	Back and Forth Series Two	1992		
"Tony Montana"	4:10	Rare	2007		
"Unovis on a Stick"	2:40	Back and Forth Series Two	1992		
"Uranus Cancelled"	4:21	Brap: Back and Forth Series 3 & 4	1996		(Note: This song is an alternate version of "Knowhere?" from Last Rights.)
"Wrong Rip Fixin"	5:25	Back & Forth Vol7	2007		
"Yo Yo Scrape"	4:39	Brap: Back and Forth Series 3 & 4	1996		

== Live recordings ==
Name of song, length, original release, year released, and year recorded
Song	Length	Original release	Year released	Year recorded	Ref(s).	Note(s)
"Addiction"	6:06	Ain't It Dead Yet?	1989	1987		
"Addiction"	6:14	Bootlegged, Broke and in Solvent Seas	2012	2010		
"All Eyes"	6:07	Brap: Back and Forth Series 3 & 4	1996	1990		(Note: This is an edited version of the Too Dark Park-era live improvisation "Walking on Ice", which was first released on the "Spasmoyltic" single.)
"Anger"	5:11	Ain't It Dead Yet?	1989	1987		
"Assimilate"	8:54	Ain't It Dead Yet?	1989	1987		
"Assimilate"	10:46	Bootlegged, Broke and in Solvent Seas	2012	2010		
"Brap"	3:36	Brap: Back and Forth Series 3 & 4	1996	1986		(Note: This live improvisation from 1986 is based on the Remission track of the same name.)
"Chainsaw"	5:35	Ain't It Dead Yet?	1989	1987		
"The Choke"	6:29	Ain't It Dead Yet?	1989	1987		
"The Choke"	7:10	Doomsday	2001	2000		
"Choralone"	3:36	Brap: Back and Forth Series 3 & 4	1996	1990		
"Choralone" (Live in Houston)	2:47	"Spasmolytic"	1991	1990		
"Convulsion"	3:10	Brap: Back and Forth Series 3 & 4	1996	1990		
"Convulsion"	3:07	Doomsday	2001	2000		
"Convulsion"	3:21	The Greater Wrong of the Right Live	2005	2004		
"Dead Lines"	6:12	Bootlegged, Broke and in Solvent Seas	2012	2010		
"Deep Down Trauma Hounds"	4:36	Ain't It Dead Yet?	1989	1987		
"Deep Down Trauma Hounds"	4:46	Doomsday	2001	2000		
"Deep Down Trauma Hounds"	4:52	The Greater Wrong of the Right Live	2005	2004		
"Dig It"	6:29	Ain't It Dead Yet?	1989	1987		
"Dig It"	6:18	Doomsday	2001	2000		
"Downsizer"	4:42	The Greater Wrong of the Right Live	2005	2004		
"Draining Faces"	5:29	Ain't It Dead Yet?	1989	1987		
"Empte"	4:33	The Greater Wrong of the Right Live	2005	2004		
"Explode the P.A." (Live Brap)	10:06	Back and Forth Series Two	1992	1985		
"First Aid"	4:49	Ain't It Dead Yet?	1989	1987		
"First Aid"	5:51	Doomsday	2001	2000		
"God's Gift (Maggot)"	4:51	The Greater Wrong of the Right Live	2005	2004		
"God's Gift"	4:47	Brap: Back and Forth Series 3 & 4	1996	1990		
"Grave Wisdom"	3:45	Doomsday	2001	2000		
"Hardset Head"	4:14	The Greater Wrong of the Right Live	2005	2004		
"Hardset Head" (Live)	4:13	Back and Forth 06Six	2003	2000		
"Harsh Stone White"	4:29	Doomsday	2001	2000		
"Harsh Stone White"	4:45	The Greater Wrong of the Right Live	2005	2004		
"Harsh Stone White" (Live in Denver)	4:53	"Spasmolytic"	1991	1990		
"Hatekill"	4:37	Bootlegged, Broke and in Solvent Seas	2012	2010		
"Hexonexxon"	5:34	The Greater Wrong of the Right Live	2005	2004		(Note: This is a performance of the song "Hexonxonx" from Rabies, renamed here to directly target Exxon, the oil company.)
"Human Disease (S.K.U.M.M.)"	6:22	The Greater Wrong of the Right Live	2005	2004		
"I'mmortal"	4:21	The Greater Wrong of the Right Live	2005	2004		
"Inquisition"	5:16	Doomsday	2001	2000		
"Inquisition"	5:24	The Greater Wrong of the Right Live	2005	2004		
"Intro"	1:58	Ain't It Dead Yet?	1989	1987		
"Intro" (Live in Winnipeg)	2:06	Back and Forth Series Two	1992	1985		
"Kill to Cure"	6:29	Provoke N° 2	1988	1988		
"Killing Game"	3:51	Doomsday	2001	2000		
"Last Call"	6:05	Brap: Back and Forth Series 3 & 4	1996	1986		
"Love in Vein"	5:18	Doomsday	2001	2000		
"Morpheus Laughing"	4:08	Bootlegged, Broke and in Solvent Seas	2012	2010		
"One Time One Place"	5:50	Ain't It Dead Yet?	1989	1987		
"Prelude"	2:40	Bootlegged, Broke and in Solvent Seas	2012	2010		
"Pro-test"	5:25	The Greater Wrong of the Right Live	2005	2004		
"Reclamation"	2:57	Brap: Back and Forth Series 3 & 4	1996	1990		
"Reclamation"	7:05	The Greater Wrong of the Right Live	2005	2004		
"Rodent"	5:50	Bootlegged, Broke and in Solvent Seas	2012	2010		
"Shore Lined Poison"	7:11	Bootlegged, Broke and in Solvent Seas	2012	2010		
"Smothered Hope"	7:02	Ain't It Dead Yet?	1989	1987		
"Smothered Hope"	13:36	The Greater Wrong of the Right Live	2005	2004		
"Social Deception"	2:58	Doomsday	2001	2000		
"T.F.W.O."	4:17	Brap: Back and Forth Series 3 & 4	1996	1990		
"Testure"	5:07	Doomsday	2001	2000		
"Testure"	5:37	The Greater Wrong of the Right Live	2005	2004		
"Tin Omen"	6:15	Brap: Back and Forth Series 3 & 4	1996	1990		(Note: The first three minutes of this recording are from the Heavens Trash bootleg (a release that was played at deafening volumes to punish prisoners at the Guantanamo Bay detention camp); the final three minutes are from the band's own recording of a 1990 performance.)
"Tin Omen"	4:39	Doomsday	2001	2000		
"Tin Omen"	4:55	The Greater Wrong of the Right Live	2005	2004		
"VX Gas Attack"	5:49	The Greater Wrong of the Right Live	2005	2004		
"Walking on Ice"	11:58	"Spasmolytic"	1991	1990		(Note: This track is composed of live improvisational excerpts from 1990 performances in San Francisco, Dallas, and Oklahoma City. "All Eyes", a song from Brap: Back and Forth Series 3 & 4, is edited down from this track.)
"Worlock"	5:46	Bootlegged, Broke and in Solvent Seas	2012	2010		
"Worlock"	5:13	Doomsday	2001	2000		
"Worlock"	5:34	The Greater Wrong of the Right Live	2005	2004		
