= Bootlegged, Broke and in Solvent Seas =

Live album by Skinny Puppy
- Released: June 12, 2012 (US); June 15, 2012 (Germany)
- Recorded: 2010
- Genre: Electro-industrial
- Label: Metropolis (US); Dependent Records (Germany)

Skinny Puppy chronology
| hanDover (2011) | Bootlegged, Broke and in Solvent Seas (2012) | Weapon (2013) |

Bootlegged, Broke and in Solvent Seas is a live album by Canadian electro-industrial band Skinny Puppy. It was recorded in Warsaw, Bratislava, Hildesheim, and Budapest during the band's 2010 European tour and saw release on June 12, 2012 through Metropolis Records in the US and on June 15, 2012 through Dependent Records in Germany.

Professional ratings
Review scores
| Source | Rating |
|---|---|
| AllMusic | 3.5/5 stars |
| Reflections of Darkness | 8.5/10 stars |

== Track listing ==
| No. | Title | Source | Length |
|---|---|---|---|
| 1. | "Prelude" (Warsaw) | | 2:40 |
| 2. | "Rodent" (Warsaw) | Rabies | 5:50 |
| 3. | "Dead Lines" (Bratislava) | Bites | 6:12 |
| 4. | "Dogshit" (Warsaw) | VIVIsectVI | 3:46 |
| 5. | "Addiction" (Bratislava) | Cleanse Fold and Manipulate | 6:14 |
| 6. | "HateKill" (Warsaw) | Back and Forth Series 6 | 4:37 |
| 7. | "Worlock" (Hildesheim) | Rabies | 5:46 |
| 8. | "Morpheus Laughing" (Warsaw) | Too Dark Park | 4:08 |
| 9. | "Assimilate" (Warsaw) | Bites | 10:46 |
| 10. | "Shore Lined Poison" (Budapest) | Too Dark Park | 7:11 |
| Total length: | | | 57:16 |

== Personnel ==
Skinny Puppy

- Nivek Ogre – vocals
- cEvin Key – keyboards, programming
- Justin Bennett – drums

Additional personnel

- Steven R. Gilmore – art direction, artwork, design
- Jeff Jacquin – management
- Ashley McMillan – backstage management
- Kerrie Kordowski-Jensen – costumes
- Ken Marshall – live sound
- Sarah Hill – projections, environment
- Tim Hill – projections, environment
- Sash Coon – prop master
- Time Gore – prosthetic designs

== Chart positions ==
| Chart (2012) | Peak position |
|---|---|
| US Heatseekers Albums (Billboard) | 46 |
