= The Greater Wrong of the Right Live =

The Greater Wrong of the Right LIVE

Video by Skinny Puppy
- Released: September 27, 2005
- Recorded: Disc 1: Montreal, November 9, 2004 at Le Spectrum; Toronto, November 10, 2004 at Kool Haus; Disc 2: 1988, 1990, 1992, 2005
- Genre: Industrial
- Length: 1:49:44
- Label: Synthetic Symphony

Professional ratings
Review scores
Source	Rating
PopMatters	9/10
Exclaim!	Favorable

The Greater Wrong of the Right LIVE is a 2-DVD set from Skinny Puppy. Disc one is live footage from their 2004 fall tour shot in Toronto, Ontario and Montreal, Quebec. Disc two includes archival footage from the band's three previous tours.

== Disc 1 ==
1. "Downsizer" (from The Greater Wrong of the Right)
2. "I'mmortal" (from The Greater Wrong of the Right)
3. "Pro-test" (from The Greater Wrong of the Right)
4. "Empte" (from The Greater Wrong of the Right)
5. "Curcible" (from The Process)
6. "God's Gift Maggot" (from Mind: The Perpetual Intercourse)
7. "VX Gas Attack" (from VIVIsectVI)
8. "Worlock" (from Rabies)
9. "Deep Down Trauma Hounds" (from Cleanse Fold and Manipulate)
10. "Hexonxonx" (from Rabies)
11. "Tin Omen" (from Rabies)
12. "Inquisition" (from Last Rights)
13. "Hardset Head" (from The Process)
14. "Human Disease (S.K.U.M.M.)" (from VIVIsectVI)
15. "Harsh Stone White" (from VIVIsectVI)
16. "Reclamation" (from Too Dark Park)
17. "Convulsion" (from Too Dark Park)
18. "Testure" (from VIVIsectVI)
19. "Smothered Hope" (from Remission)

== Disc 2 ==
1. Information Warfare
2. Eurotrauma: Skinny Puppy Live in Europe 1988 (filmed during April–May 1988)
3. Last Rights: Archival Footage - From the 1992 Cincinnati, OH show (filmed on June 2, 1992 at Bogart's), filmed by Jim Van Bebber (director).
4. Too Dark Park: Archival Footage - From the 1990 Cincinnati, OH show (filmed on November 6, 1990, also at Bogart's), filmed by Jim Van Bebber (director).

Technical Features: Widescreen, All Regions, 5.1 Surround Sound, Dolby Digital

Director: William Morrison

Audio Mix: Ken "Hiwatt" Marshall

Cover Art: Fredox

Cover Design: Steven R. Gilmore

Inside Cover Photography: Austin Young
