= Back & Forth Vol7 =

Compilation album by Skinny Puppy
- Released: May 2007
- Recorded: Various locations
- Genre: Industrial
- Length: 1:10:50
- Label: Subconscious Communications
- Producer: Scaremeister

Professional ratings
Review scores
Source	Rating
ReGen Magazine	4/5 stars

Back & Forth Vol7 is an album by industrial music group Skinny Puppy, consisting of outtakes from Last Rights and The Process. It was released through cEvin Key's Subconscious Communications in 2007. It was the only Vault release issued during the Mythrus tour.

== Track listing ==
No.	Title	Length
1.	"First Night in Malibu"	1:07
2.	"Wrong Rip Fixin"	5:25
3.	"Morphous (Demo Version)"	4:12
4.	"Cast Iron Bathtub"	2:35
5.	"Process²"	1:52
6.	"This Is Your Terror"	2:18
7.	"Cauldron of Sorrow"	3:34
8.	"All in Her Mind"	3:09
9.	"Disco Infernal (Raw Candle)"	5:24
10.	"Mindfuck 17"	1:49
11.	"Those Loud Neighbours"	5:58
12.	"Hud (Amnesia Odd)"	4:17
13.	"Kstorm"	6:49
14.	"Haunted"	9:05
15.	"Its History"	5:08
16.	"Blood"	5:12
17.	"Sters 150"	4:10

== Personnel ==
- Written-by — Dwayne Goettel, Nivek Ogre and cEvin Key
- Guitar — Pat Sproule
- Artwork (Graphics) — Simon Paul
- Artwork (Painting) — Allen Jaeger
