= Ain't It Dead Yet? =

Live album by Skinny Puppy
- Released: 1989
- Recorded: May 31, 1987, at Toronto Concert Hall
- Genres: Electro-industrial, Industrial
- Length: 68:35
- Label: Nettwerk
- Producers: Dave Ogilvie, cEvin Key

Skinny Puppy chronology
VIVIsectVI (1988)	Ain't It Dead Yet? (1989)	Rabies (1989)

Professional ratings
Review scores
Source	Rating
Allmusic	3/5 stars

Ain't it Dead Yet? is a recording of Canadian electronic group Skinny Puppy's performance at the Toronto Concert Hall on May 31, 1987, during their Cleanse Fold and Manipulate Tour. It was released as an album in 1989. The film was showcased at the South by Southwest festival on March 18, 1989.

== Track listing ==
No.	Title	Length
1.	"Intro"	1:58
2.	"Anger" (From Cleanse Fold and Manipulate)	5:11
3.	"The Choke" (From Bites)	6:29
4.	"Addiction" (From Cleanse Fold and Manipulate)	6:06
5.	"Assimilate" (From Bites)	8:54
6.	"First Aid" (From Cleanse Fold and Manipulate)	4:49
7.	"Dig It" (From Mind: The Perpetual Intercourse)	6:29
8.	"One Time One Place" (From Mind: The Perpetual Intercourse)	5:50
9.	"Deep Down Trauma Hounds" (From Cleanse Fold and Manipulate)	4:36
10.	"Chainsaw" (From Chainsaw)	5:35
11.	"Draining Faces" (From Cleanse Fold and Manipulate)	5:29
12.	"Smothered Hope" (From Remission)	7:02

== Notes ==
All artwork by Steven R. Gilmore.

Some pressings incorrectly list "One Time One Place" as "God's Gift Maggot". All copies of the CD version incorrectly list "Draining Faces" as "Brap".

Also available on DVD and VHS. The DVDs have been plagued with issues; the first pressings omitted the introduction clip that was on the VHS release. Some later pressings have serious issues with balance and bass.

Some CD pressings present the recording as a single track.

Recorded by Ric Arboit, mixed by Dave Ogilvie.

== Personnel ==
- Ogre – vocals, theatrics
- Dwayne Goettel – synthesizers, electronic drums
- cEvin Key – drums, synthesizers, electric guitar
