= Weapon (album) =

Studio album by Skinny Puppy
- Released: May 28, 2013
- Genre: Electro-industrial; glitch
- Length: 45:36
- Label: Metropolis (MET870)
- Producer: Skinny Puppy

Skinny Puppy chronology
HanDover (2011)	Weapon (2013)

Singles from Weapon
- 1. "Salvo" Released: May 14, 2013; 2. "Illisit" Released: November 19, 2013

Weapon is the twelfth and final studio album by Canadian electro-industrial band Skinny Puppy. It was released on May 28, 2013, through Metropolis Records. Skinny Puppy received mainstream media attention when the band billed the U.S. government for using its music as torture in the Guantanamo Bay detention camp, which was a primary source of inspiration for the album. Musically, Weapon's sound is reminiscent of Skinny Puppy's earliest releases, Remission (1984) and Bites (1985), due to the employment of old equipment and simplified songwriting.

The song "Salvo" was released early for streaming on May 14, 2013, a music video for the song "Illisit" was directed by Jason Alacrity and released online, and the album was followed by several tours.

== Background and concept ==
"Tin Omen"
A clip from the bootlegged version of "Tin Omen" that was used for torture.

Weapon was inspired by the news that Skinny Puppy's music had been used for torture sessions at the Guantanamo Bay detention camp. In 2011, the band was approached by a Guantanamo prison guard who heard bootlegged Skinny Puppy music being played to prisoners at damaging volumes for six to twelve hours as a punishment. The guard, Terry Holdbrooks, recognized the music as coming from an unofficial 1993 release called Heavens Trash. This revelation prompted the band to develop the concept of Weapon, even going so far as originally planning to include an instructional manual detailing how to use the album to torture people. In early 2014, a few months following the album's release, Skinny Puppy received mainstream media attention after sending an invoice totaling $666,000 to the US Department of Defense for the use of its music during torture sessions. The Department of Defense never responded to the invoice, and governmental officials denied using any music as torture. Regarding the employment of his music in such a capacity, founding Skinny Puppy member cEvin Key criticized the government both for using the music without permission and for using it as "an actual weapon against somebody". He clarified that the billing was not for financial gain, but was to make a point.

Other influences on Weapon's sound include the 2011 Fukushima Daiichi nuclear disaster and American gun culture. Regarding the refinement of the album's concept, vocalist Nivek Ogre said:

Then I stumbled on the more abstract idea about all the things around us that are weapons that are dormant, that are built to be safe. Nuclear power became one of those; it was a big elephant in the room topics to me, especially after the meltdown in Fukushima and the subsequent clampdown in the media about what's happening, what's going to happen, and the fact that we have 23 of those similar reactors sitting around the United States, which are holding in their spent fuel pools.

The album's artwork features a giant mechanized spider made of various weapons ranging from blades to firearms. It was created by longtime Skinny Puppy collaborator Steven R. Gilmore.

== Composition ==
"The rule was originally that we'd only use tools that were available during that time period, so we'd have to go back and resurrect a Studer 2-inch tape machine. It became very cost prohibitive for us to do it that way. And it also became clear that really what we were looking to do was just go back to simple and direct songwriting."

—Nivek Ogre on the recording of Weapon.

When the time came to record Weapon, the members of Skinny Puppy decided to go through the process in a way dissimilar to their other post-reunion albums. Key, Ogre, and Mark Walk were frustrated by the result of long production time on their previous record, so they returned to the fast-paced cycle of Skinny Puppy's early years, completing the album in "less than a few months". Additionally, Weapon was recorded without the aid of management or a professional studio. Ogre called the process of creating the album "amorphous", saying that "the days are gone of having to actually rent studio time and block out however many days you're going to have to stay within budget." This lightweight approach allowed the band to achieve the speed of production it desired. The group started work on the new album by remaking the song "Solvent" from its 1984 EP, Remission, due to Ogre's dissatisfaction with how the original track came out, especially vocally. Using "Solvent" and Weapon's first track, "Wornin'" (stylized as "wornin'"), as a guide, the band experimented with many outmoded instruments and methods in an effort to recapture a distinctly minimal electronic sound. Key said the return to Skinny Puppy's electronic and equipment roots "seemed right". Ultimately, the self-imposed restriction of 1980s-era equipment proved too confining, so the band instead chose to focus on the approach and execution of those early albums.

"Glowbel"
"Glowbel" is an example of Weapon's minimal and retrospective musical direction.

Musically, Weapon is densely electronic, existing in the space between synth-pop and industrial music and combining the two in a blend of bright melodies, grating rhythms, and harsh vocals; it has been called both electro-industrial and glitch music. Ogre's vocals range from spoken word and rap to his more characteristically abrasive style. Some publications noted the album for having surprisingly conventional song structures with "singalong" choruses. Zachary Houle of PopMatters called Weapon "downright accessible", a stark contrast against the noisier music Skinny Puppy is known for. Still, the album retains the atypical programmed beats of industrial music, taking advantage of a wide range of percussion from clicks and whirs to deep booms. The album's second song, "Illisit" (stylized as "illisiT"), is an aggressive electronic single with scathing lyrics and multi-layered electronics. Daniel Sylvester of Exclaim! called it the album's best and catchiest track, writing that it "is a polished revisiting of everything that makes Skinny Puppy so compelling: decaying beats and nail-driving refrains, along with world-gone-wrong rants." The third track, "Salvo" (stylized as "saLvo"), features breakbeats that are both "ominous" and "funky" and employs a number of superimposed, ghostly sounds. "Glowbel" (stylized as "gLowbeL") acts as a microcosm of Weapon at large, containing equal parts of sinisterly conveyed aggression and optimistic melody. "Solvent" (stylized as "solvent"), the album's midpoint, remains compositionally unchanged from its original 1984 incarnation, but the version on Weapon is much sharper and more professionally recorded, with notably refined vocals and improved production.

The second half of the album is darker and more introspective than the first. Weapon's sixth track, "Paragun" (stylized as "paragUn"), features an overpowering chorus and a danceable rhythm, while the following song, "Survivalisto" (stylized as "survivalisto"), is slow and somber with new wave influences. "Tsudanama" (stylized as "tsudanama") is Weapon's heaviest song with "alien, non-linear squeaks and rubbery rhythms" and an emphasis on bass. "Plasicage" (stylized as "plasiCage") is another weighty dance track, but the album's closer, "Terminal" (stylized as "terminal"), is its softest and most dreary, being described by Laura Wiebe of Exclaim! as "a synth-pop requiem" with a sentimental, dirge-like sound. Some critics drew comparisons between it and the ballad "Killing Game" from 1992's Last Rights. "Overdose", the hidden track that appears after "Terminal", is a previously unreleased song from the Remission and Bites era with redone vocals, further tying Weapon back to those initial releases.

== Touring ==
Nivek Ogre performing with Skinny Puppy on December 8, 2014 at The Pageant in St. Louis

Skinny Puppy began performing the album's songs from January 2014 onward, starting with the Live Shapes for Arms tour. The set lists covered a broad range of material, and the stage show was elaborate and complicated. Later in 2014, the band returned to the road for another tour entitled Eye vs Spy, bringing Youth Code, Haujobb, and Front Line Assembly as opening acts. These performances saw Ogre changing between numerous costumes throughout the show, playing a character undergoing stages of mutation at the hand of nuclear radiation. Ogre began these shows as a hunch-backed, rain-coated figure with a white mask, an umbrella with a fallout symbol, a cumbersome box, and a plaster dog statue. As the show progressed, he became a force-fed animal with a suit of many pelts, and later a deformed monstrosity affected by the radiation let loose from the box. The themes of experimentation had previously been explored on Skinny Puppy's 1988 tour in support of the album VIVIsectVI, as had the concept of bodily mutation on the 1992 Last Rights tour.

== Release ==
Weapon was released to retailers worldwide on May 28, 2013. It was well-received by critics, several of whom appreciated the musical style being reminiscent of that of the 1980s. Weapon was available as an LP, CD (both Digipak and jewel case), and as a digital download. The LP was reissued in 2016. The album entered on several record charts, including the Billboard 200 where it peaked at 140. Weapon was followed by a music video for the song "Illisit". Jason Alacrity, a fan of Skinny Puppy who had worked with Ogre on some previous projects, approached the band wanting to make a video. After securing Skinny Puppy's endorsement, Alacrity created the video, which features a mechanical spider, a fugitive running from an armed soldier, and skull imagery reminiscent of the cover for Remission.

=== Critical reception ===
Professional ratings
Aggregate scores
Source	Rating
Metacritic	76/100
Review scores
Source	Rating
AllMusic	4/5 stars
Exclaim!	7/10
Head Full of Noise	5/5 stars
PopMatters	7/10 stars
The Province	B−
Release Magazine	8/10
Spin	5/10
Sputnikmusic	3.5/5

Weapon was met with positive reception. The album received an average score of 76/100 from 6 reviews on Metacritic, indicating "generally favorable reviews". AllMusic's David Jeffries called Weapon "an instantly recognizable return to form for the veteran electro-industrial group, and a sure about-face from the film-worthy, large-landscape music the group has released since the millennium turned." Zachary Houle of PopMatters wrote, "Weapon does what it does so satisfyingly well, that it makes you rethink the concept of industrial music." Exclaim! writer Daniel Sylvester said that Weapon was the band's best effort since 1992's Last Rights. Also writing for Exclaim!, Laura Wiebe gave the album a positive review, highlighting its focused employment of electronics and how it focused on rhythm. Michael Davis of Head Full of Noise awarded Weapon a perfect score, saying that Skinny Puppy "achieve a fluid and solid combination of their older style with the new" and that it "works and sounds beautiful".

Stuart Derdeyn of The Province called the album "classic Puppy", and wrote "what may surprise longtime fans is how clean the mix is. Grim but also somewhat weirdly calming". Writing for Release Magazine, Peter Marchione compared the album to Remission, saying that "the sound is retro and very analogue and if it wasn't for Ogre's improved singing technique, ...many of the tracks could easily have been almost 30 years old". Marchione concluded that Weapon "lives its own life like in a parallel existence that now has re-begun right after the earliest formation of our beloved Puppy, before Dwayne was in the band". Writing for the Chicago Music Guide, Dennis Kelly applauded the album, noting that the re-recording of the song "Solvent" was "a smart move on their part to potentially introduce new fans to their earlier work".

Ogre's vocals were especially lauded for returning to the lacerating, abrasive quality of the band's earlier albums. Some publications considered Weapon Skinny Puppy's best effort since reforming in 2000. However, not all reception was positive; Spin gave Weapon a middling review, calling the band "tired". Trey Spencer of Sputnikmusic praised Weapon, but also recognized that it could disappoint fans who want a return to Skinny Puppy's more industrial sound.

== Track listing ==
All tracks are written by cEvin Key, N. Ogre, Mark Walk.

No.	Title	Length
1.	"Wornin'"	4:42
2.	"Illisit"	3:57
3.	"Salvo"	3:45
4.	"Glowbel"	3:15
5.	"Solvent"	4:37
6.	"Paragun"	4:52
7.	"Survivalisto"	4:50
8.	"Tsudanama"	5:53
9.	"Plasicage"	3:13
10.	"Terminal" ("Overdose" starts at 5:01)	7:10
Total length:		45:36

Digital version
No.	Title	Length
11.	"Overdose"	2:09

Notes

- On all physical releases of Weapon, a minute of silence and the hidden song "Overdose" are appended to the end of "Terminal" as a single track. Digital versions of the album separate the two tracks.
- The following are the album's stylized track titles: "wornin'", "illisiT", "saLvo", "gLowbeL", "solvent", "paragUn", "survivalisto", "tsudanama", "plasiCage", and "terminal".
- The capital letters in the song titles can be arranged to read "CULLLT", and the O from the bonus track "Overdose" can be added to the message, making it read "OCULLLT". These letters are highlighted as orange on the album's packaging. Ogre's side project with Walk (Ohgr) used the same method to conceal messages in its first two albums.

== Personnel ==
Credits are adapted from the album's liner notes.

Skinny Puppy

- Nivek Ogre – vocals, keyboards
- cEvin Key – keyboards, percussion, electronics, guitars, theremin
- Mark Walk – programming, bass, guitars

Additional personnel

- Ken "Hiwatt" Marshall – mixing and mastering
- Traz Damji – additional instruments (track 6)
- Steven R. Gilmore – sleeve design and illustrations

== Chart positions ==
Charts (2013)	Peak position
German Alternative Albums (Deutsche Alternative Charts)	1
Swedish Albums (Sverigetopplistan)	60
US Billboard 200	140
US Top Dance Albums (Billboard)	4
US Independent Albums (Billboard)	21
