= The Greater Wrong of the Right =

Studio album by Skinny Puppy
- Released: May 25, 2004
- Recorded: 2003 – 2004
- Studio: Subconscious Studios
- Genre: IDM; electronica; electro-industrial; industrial rock
- Length: 48:36
- Label: SPV; Metropolis Records
- Producer: cEvin Key; Mark Walk

Skinny Puppy chronology
The Process (1996)	The Greater Wrong of the Right (2004)	Mythmaker (2007)

Singles from The Greater Wrong of the Right
- 1. "Pro-test" Released: August 2004

The Greater Wrong of the Right is the ninth studio album by Canadian electro-industrial band Skinny Puppy, released by SPV on May 25, 2004. It is their first full-length record since 1996's The Process. It is also their first album since 1985's Bites without the support of keyboardist Dwayne Goettel, who died in 1995, and their first album since the departure of producer Dave "Rave" Ogilvie. It was produced by Cevin Key and is Ohgr-collaborator Mark Walk's first appearance as an official member of the band. The album's artwork was created by longtime collaborator Steven R. Gilmore.

After the difficult recording of The Process, band members Key and Nivek Ogre chose to focus on solo projects before accepting an offer to perform as Skinny Puppy at the Doomsday Festival in 2000. Afterward, Key and Ogre reformed the band with Walk and recorded new material throughout 2003. Stylistically, the album is a departure from their earlier work as the band wished to explore more melodic song structures. It also features contributions from musicians such as Danny Carey and Wayne Static. The album was promoted by the single "Pro-test" and by a world tour.

The Greater Wrong of the Right received mostly positive reviews from critics, who complimented its style and production. The album reached number 176 on the Billboard 200, and appeared on several other charts.

== Background ==
Following the troubled recording of their 1996 album The Process, which ended with the death of keyboardist Dwayne Goettel, the surviving members of Skinny Puppy disbanded and sought alternative musical outlets. Nivek Ogre began work on his Ohgr project with Mark Walk and recorded the album Bedside Toxicology with Martin Atkins; Cevin Key made Download his primary focus and also released his first solo album, Music for Cats, in 1998; and producer Dave "Rave" Ogilvie began working with acts such a Nine Inch Nails, Marilyn Manson, and David Bowie.

In 2000, Key and Ogre reunited for a one-off performance as Skinny Puppy at the Doomsday Festival in Dresden. Ogilvie declined an invitation to participate in the show. Afterwards, the pair traveled to Prague where they discussed the possibility of producing a new Skinny Puppy album that would take the band's sound in a new direction. Until they could produce the album, they took to contributing to each other's solo projects. After scoring a deal with SPV, the pair officially reformed Skinny Puppy in 2003 with Walk. Their first new song together, titled "Optimissed", was included on the Underworld soundtrack.

Key and Ogre both observed how positively their relationship had developed since their reunion, noting in particular a respect for each other's opinions which had been absent in the past. Key attributed his rekindled partnership with Ogre to their sobriety from hard drugs, saying "we have a few drinks, and we smoke weed. Every other drug only pulled us away from being better at what we could have been." Ogre remarked, "why hold to your grave these irrelevant reasons not to have a relationship with someone you shared so much of your life with?' I spent a lot of time with this guy making music, you know?" Ogilvie formed his own band, Jakalope, in 2003 and did not return to Skinny Puppy.

== Composition ==
The band avoided external influences when recording the album, instead opting to seek inspiration from their previous work and hone elements that they thought they could expand on. This included using synthesizers that had been employed in the recording of 1984's Remission, some of which were utilized in the song "Past Present". Key also used a wide variety of new equipment when composing, explaining that it "helped us to do a better job at what we've always done". Other inspiration came from shared experiences; the song "Goneja" was inspired by a trip Key and Ogre took to Jamaica. Additional musicians were brought in, including support from Tool drummer Danny Carey and Static-X frontman Wayne Static. Key worked with guest musicians one-on-one to avoid "making it an overwhelming situation with too many cooks in the kitchen". The band dropped the jam session style of music making they had used in the past and adopted a more focused style of writing, where one member would come up with an idea and the others would take turns expanding on it. The band produced 40 demo tracks from which Ogre choose what he felt best suited his lyrics.

Commenting on the album's sound, Key said he knew people would be divided on the band's direction. He continued, "I've heard some people complaining, like, 'Ohhh, there's just not enough pure hardcore noise or completely discombobulated beats,' and it's like, well, maybe we'll get there again! We could have made a solid noise album, but that would have been an album that sounded like not so much of a progression to us". Ogre agreed with Key's sentiment:

I think the passage of time has painted us into a corner of being something so chaotic and so incredibly dark, but if you go back over our catalog there's a lot of moments where there are softness and a less abrasive and very melodic aspect to what we did. We've always had that within us -- we're not just doing this to be these malevolent, malignant tumoresque musicians who are continually delving into the evil side of life and supporting it to the very end!

== Release and promotion ==
The Greater Wrong of the Right was released worldwide on May 25, 2004. The album was released as a digipack with a cardboard sleeve. The German promotional release came in a jewelcase and included the early working titles for songs. The Japanese release was distributed by Nippon Crown and came in a jewel case with a cardboard slipcover. It included a foldable booklet with a biography of the band and song translations in Japanese.

The album reached number 176 on the Billboard 200 and the number one position on the Deutsche Alternative Charts. It also reached the number nine and seven spots on Billboards Independent Albums and Heatseekers Albums charts, respectively. The band released a music video for the song "Pro-test" directed by long-time collaborator William Morrison. The video depicts a rivalry between two groups of breakdancers and was inspired by Morrison's previous video work documenting the dance style.

The album was re-released by Metropolis Records on January 28, 2014.

=== Tour ===
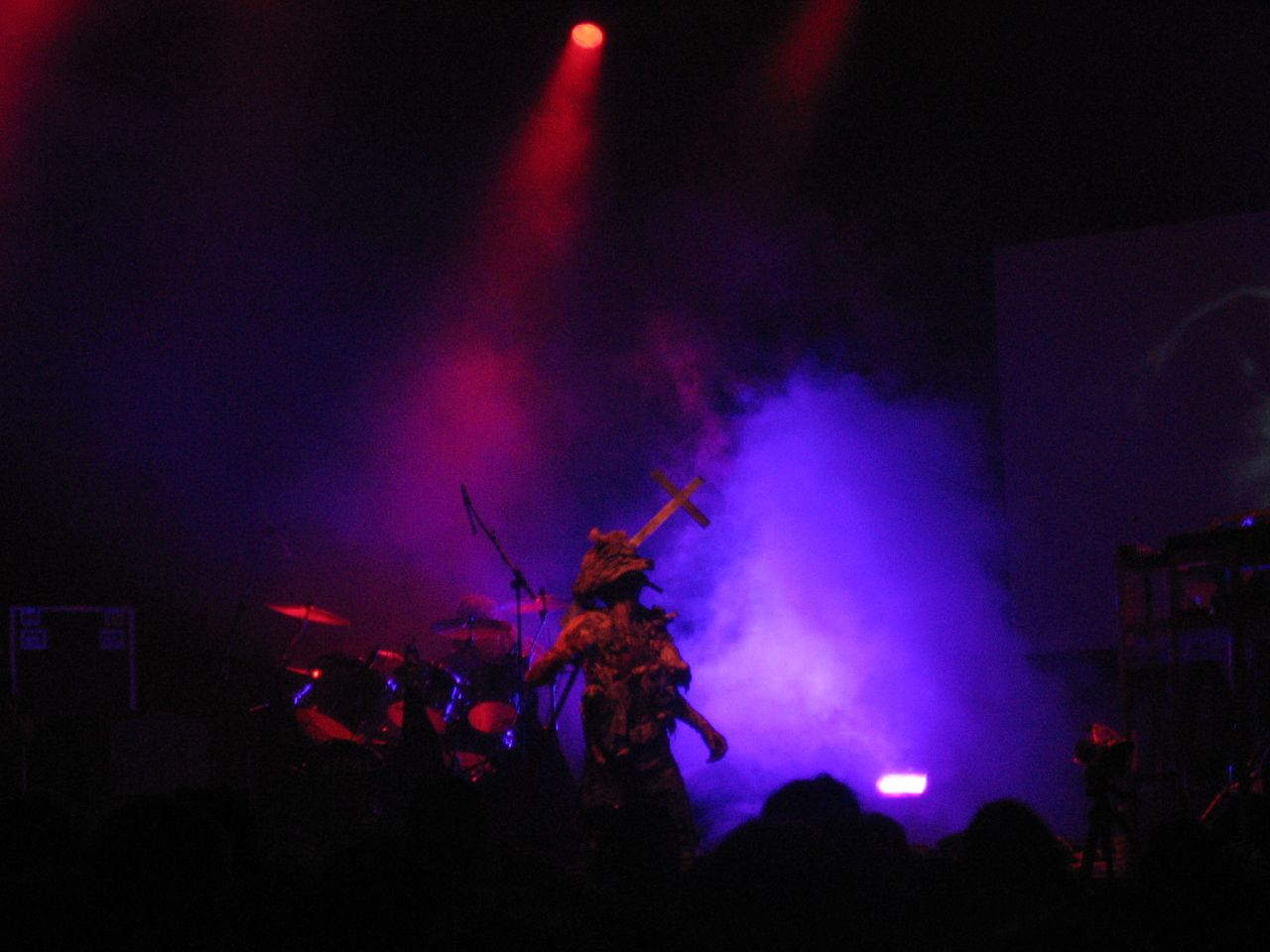
Skinny Puppy performing live in August 2005

Following the album's release, Skinny Puppy embarked on a large world tour which included shows in North America, Europe, Japan, and Australia. Their first show of the tour was at the Roseland Theater in Portland, Oregon. An additional 20 date North American tour began in October 2004. Supporting musicians included Chris Vrenna's solo project Tweaker and Otto Von Schirach, who worked on the album. Key performed keyboard duties while Morrison joined the band as guitarist. Justin Bennett was hired as the band's live drummer. Key's custom made drum kit, dubbed the "drumasaurous", was not utilized as it had been on previous tours. Key's initial plan was for Carey to play drums, but he was unable join due to scheduling conflicts. A full schedule also caused the band to declined a spot on the 2004 Lollapalooza tour, which was ultimately cancelled due to poor ticket sales. According to Key, several shows, including a date in Israel, were cancelled due to the financial costs of transporting their gear. The band returned to Europe in 2005 for several festival dates including appearances at the Sziget Festival and M'era Luna Festival.

The costume used at the beginning of each show was designed by Ogre and built by a company called Cyberoptics. Ogre wanted the suit to invoke images of both a canine and a plague doctor, but admitted it resembled "more of a soldier like character". The anti-Bush administration stance presented during the stageshow, which included caricatures of George W. Bush and Dick Cheney performing a mock execution of Ogre, prompted the conservative group Patriot Americans Boycotting Anti-American Hollywood to attempt a boycott of college radio stations that played Skinny Puppy. Over the course of the tour, Ogre suffered several allergic reactions to the fake blood he used onstage and received chemical burns in his eyes at a show in Seattle. He said the reactions were likely caused by the flour he used to make the fake blood. A concert film was recorded using footage from shows in Montreal and Toronto, and released as The Greater Wrong of the Right Live in 2005.

== Critical reception ==
Professional ratings
Aggregate scores
Source	Rating
Metacritic	79/100
Review scores
Source	Rating
AllMusic	3/5 stars
Billboard	Favorable
Calgary Herald	3/5 stars
Entertainment Weekly	B
Exclaim!	Favorable
Orlando Sentinel	4/5 stars
PopMatters	Favorable
The Province	3/5 stars
Rolling Stone	4.5/5 stars
Tiny Mix Tapes	4/5 stars

The Greater Wrong of the Right received generally favorable reviews from music critics, with an average score of 79 based on 7 reviews on review aggregator Metacritic. Scott Schinder of Entertainment Weekly said that "While its accessible sound may alienate longtime fans, Greater Wrong suggests this Puppy is heading for a rewarding adulthood", while Spin magazine's Alexander Chow said the album was "More polished and less textured, but still a diabolical nightmare". Paul Robicheau from Rolling Stone magazine wrote "They're no longer the scary Puppy of the Eighties that inspired Nine Inch Nails. But there is still enough edge - musical and political - to fuel this streamlined return". Orlando Weekly said that the album "represents a kind of an aesthetic bridge, taking the best elements of contemporary metal, glitch and post-'90s industrial, and combining them in a way that will appeal to dyed-in-the-wool Puppy fans" and newer listeners.

Mark Adair from Exclaim! criticized the album's first two songs for being too radio-friendly, but praised the closing tracks, concluding that "This disc goes from commercial to brilliant in ten songs. It is a more accessible sound than previous efforts, but still a solid entry to the band's discography". Norman Narvaja of the Cleveland Scene praised the album, saying "In many ways, instead of clinging to old methods, the songs reflect where the players are in 2004", and concluded by saying the record "confronts and challenges both old and new listeners". In a review for Billboard magazine, Christa L. Titus described the album as "a riveting set that draws from the act's complex, mechanical palette". Jim Abbott of the Orlando Sentinel said the album demonstrated "the band's ability to unite muscle with message". He praised songs such as "Empte" and "Use Less" for their lyrics and "tribal beats", and concluded that "the band's ability to again make music of such demanding complexity suggests that all is not lost". Alternative Press said the album was the band's most melodic and concluded "the album exudes an energy that was mostly sporadic in their previous material".

Some critics were less positive, such as Nick Lewis from the Calgary Herald who stated that while the album was "not essential", it "showcases a band that, 22 years later, is still relevant and ahead of its peers". In his review for the Washington Post, Mark Jenkins said the album was "a credible but generally unsurprising attempt" from the band, but commended more melodic tracks such as "Empte" and "Past Present". AllMusic's David Jeffries described the album as The Process "done right", but criticized songs such as "Neuworld". However, he continued that the album sounded "more inspired" than their previous effort and concluded that with "stunning structure from Key, it beats most of the current industrial music competition".

In a negative review for The Spectrum, Rustin Reber panned the album for its lack of guitar work, calling it "electronic noise". He concluded, "I'm probably prejudice against those who create every part of an entire song with a MIDI controller and recorded samples of music, but I doubt this is anything appealing to the few souls reading this article".

== Track listing ==
All tracks are written by Ogre/Key/Walk.

No.	Title	Length
1.	"I'mmortal"	4:16
2.	"Pro-test"	5:29
3.	"EmpTe"	4:11
4.	"Neuwerld"	5:28
5.	"Ghostman"	4:55
6.	"dOwnsizer"	4:20
7.	"Past Present"	6:27
8.	"Use Less"	4:47
9.	"Goneja"	5:25
10.	"DaddyuWarbash"	3:18
Total length:		48:36

Notes

- Early promotional materials listed the working titles for these songs as: "Immortal", "Streets", "Empty", "Lip", "Ghostman", "Dogpound", "Past-Present", "Useless", "Otto Thing", and "Partee w Mee"

== Personnel ==
- Nivek Ogre (vocals)
- cEvin Key (various instruments)
- Mark Walk (various instruments)
- Ken Marshall (additional production)
- Traz Damji (synthesis – 1)
- Pat Sprawl (guitar – 1, 2)
- Otto Von Schirach (sound design – 1, 9; synthesis, programming – 5)
- Statik (synthesis, programming – 1, 2, 3, 6, 8)
- Omar Torres (synthesis, programming – 2, 4, 5, 7)
- Saki Kaskas (second guitar – 8)
- Danny Carey (acoustic drums – 8)
- Wayne Static (second vocal – 8)
- Cyrusrex (synthesis, programming – 9)
- Dre Robinson (synthesis – 10)
- Brian Gardener (mastering)

== Chart positions ==
Chart (2004)	Peak position
German Alternative Albums (Deutsche Alternative Charts)	1
US Billboard 200	176
US Independent Albums (Billboard)	9
US Heatseekers Albums (Billboard)	7

== See also ==
- Greater Wrong of the Right Live, DVD documenting the tour supporting the album.
