= Doomsday (Skinny Puppy album) =

Live album by Skinny Puppy
- Released: August 21, 2001
- Recorded: August 20, 2000; Dresden, Germany
- Genre: Industrial
- Length: 67:55
- Label: Nettwerk

Skinny Puppy chronology
B-Sides Collect (1999)	Doomsday (2001)	Puppy Gristle (2002)

Professional ratings
Review scores
Source	Rating
Allmusic	3/5 stars

Doomsday (also known as Brap: Doomsday: Back and Forth Volume 5: Live in Dresden) is a live CD from the band Skinny Puppy. The album was recorded at an August 20, 2000 performance at the Doomsday Festival in Dresden, Germany. This performance marked the reunion of former bandmates, cEvin Key and Nivek Ogre. It was the first Skinny Puppy concert since 1992, first in Europe since 1988, and first ever in the former East Germany. Skinny Puppy resumed touring in 2004 with The Greater Wrong of the Right Tour.

== Track listing ==
No.	Title	Length
1.	"Deep Down Trauma Hounds" (From Cleanse Fold and Manipulate)	4:46
2.	"Love in Vein" (From Last Rights)	5:18
3.	"Inquisition" (From Last Rights)	5:16
4.	"Convulsion" (From Too Dark Park)	3:07
5.	"Worlock" (From Rabies)	5:13
6.	"Grave Wisdom" (From Too Dark Park)	3:45
7.	"Killing Game" (From Last Rights)	3:51
8.	"Social Deception" (From Bites)	2:58
9.	"First Aid" (From Cleanse Fold and Manipulate)	5:51
10.	"Testure" (From VIVIsectVI)	5:07
11.	"Dig It" (From Mind: The Perpetual Intercourse)	6:18
12.	"Tin Omen" (From Rabies)	4:39
13.	"Harsh Stone White" (From VIVIsectVI)	4:29
14.	"The Choke" (From Bites)	7:10

== Original performance ==
The CD is an edited version of the concert as four songs were omitted. The original concert setlist was as follows:

1. Choralone *
2. Deep Down Trauma Hounds
3. Love in Vein
4. Inquisition
5. Hardset Head *
6. Convulsion
7. Worlock
8. Grave Wisdom
9. Killing Game
10. Social Deception
11. First Aid
12. Testure
13. Dig It
14. Tin Omen
15. Nature's Revenge *
16. Harsh Stone White
17. The Choke
18. Smothered Hope *

* Denotes that this song was not included on the CD release.

"Hardset Head", which had never been performed live before, was to appear on the CD but was dropped due to copyright issues. It was available for download as an mp3 file on Nettwerk's website and later appeared on Back and Forth 6 in 2003.

=== DVD ===
The show was also recorded via DV video for a DVD release. Nettwerk, due to financial reasons, ultimately decided against the release.

== Personnel ==
- cEvin Key – live drums
- Nivek Ogre – vocals

Backing tapes were used for the rest of the music.

=== Production ===
- Stefen Herwig – Doomsday live show production
- Mike Schorler and Sven Borges – concert promotion
- Greg Reely – recording and sound engineer
- Phil Western – programmed by (additional)
- Ernst Tochtenhagen – local stage management
- Graf Haufen – video footage, video production
- Christian Poeck – video production
- Udo Strass – video projection
- Alex Skull – backline
- Ellen Döhring – additional backline
- Marcus Scriba and Loki – Ogre doubles
- Thomas Schöttler – device coordination
- Gunter Wessling – device construction
- Thomas Kuntz – animatronic puppet creation
- Mark Bramhill – backup vocalist
