= Who's Laughing Now =

Who's Laughing Now may refer to:

- Who's Laughing Now (album) (1991), by L.A.P.D.
- "Who's Laughing Now" (Jessie J song) (2011)
- "Who's Laughing Now" (Ava Max song) (2020)
- "Who's Laughing Now", a song by Skinny Puppy (1988)
- "Who's Laughing Now", a song by From Ashes to New from Day One (2016)
- "Who's Laughing Now", a song by Hollywood Vampires from Rise (2019)

== See also ==
- "Look Who's Laughing Now", a song by Benjamin Ingrosso (2024)
