= Track 10 =

Song by Skinny Puppy

Single by Skinny Puppy

from the album Last Rights
- Released: August 20, 2000
- Genre: Electro-industrial
- Length: 4:39
- Label: Subconscious Communications
- Songwriter: Skinny Puppy
- Producers: Dave Ogilvie; cEvin Key

Skinny Puppy singles chronology
"Candle" (1996)	"Track 10" (2000)	"Politikil" (2007)

Audio sample
- file; help

"Track 10", originally titled "Left Handshake", is a song by Canadian electro-industrial band Skinny Puppy created for its 1992 album Last Rights. The track was meant to close Last Rights, but it was ultimately cut due to threatened legal action from the owner of a sample that appears in the song. "Track 10" did not see individual release until August 20, 2000, when it was sold at Skinny Puppy's reunion performance in Germany.

== Background and content ==
Skinny Puppy's seventh album, Last Rights, was originally going to end with the song "Left Handshake", which prominently featured a number of samples of Timothy Leary's voice from his 1967 release Turn On, Tune In, Drop Out. Because so many clips of Leary speaking were employed in the song, Skinny Puppy sought him out to ask for permission to use the sound bites. Leary agreed, and so the song was completed. Shortly after that, Henry G. Saperstein, the holder of the rights to the album from which Leary's voice was sampled, threatened to sue the band if they released "Left Handshake". The track was pulled from the album and replaced with "Download", an eleven-minute experimental song that became a critical favorite. Some releases of Last Rights preserve blank tenth track where "Left Handshake" should be.

"Left Handshake" saw release on various bootlegs, but was first officially distributed on some European pressings of the 1996 compilation Brap: Back and Forth Series 3 & 4. It was released as a single on August 20, 2000 as "Track 10"; the disc was limited to just 1,000 copies, 600 of which were sold at Skinny Puppy's reunion performance at Doomsday Festival in Dresden, Germany. The cover art of "Track 10" is based on John Rheaume's frontispiece for the tenth issue of Hellraiser. The disc was issued in a cardboard sleeve with no catalog number, credits, or mention of the band's name.

== Track listing ==
No.	Title	Length
1.	"Left Handshake"	4:39

== Personnel ==
All credits adapted from Last Rights' liner notes.

Skinny Puppy

- Nivek Ogre – vocals
- cEvin Key – synthesizers, guitars, bass guitars, drums, production
- Dwayne Goettel – synthesizers, sampling, mixing

Additional personnel

- Dave Ogilvie – production
