= Manuel Ocampo =

Filipino artist

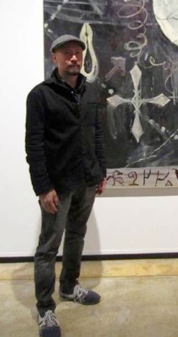
- Manuel Ocampo in Montpellier, France
- Born: Manuel Ocampo; 1965 (age 60–61); Quezon City, Philippines
- Education: University of the Philippines, California State University
- Known for: Painting
- Movement: Philippine Social Realism, Neo-Expressionism
- Awards: Pollock Krasner Grant,

Manuel Ocampo (born 1965) is a Filipino artist. His work fuses sacred Baroque religious iconography with secular political narrative. His works draw upon a wide range of art historical references, contain cartoonish elements, and draw inspiration from punk subculture.

== Background ==
Manuel Ocampo was born in the Philippines. He studied fine arts at the University of the Philippines, then moved to Los Angeles, California in the 1980s, where he studied at the California State University. Ocampo has since moved to back to Manila living with his wife and children.

== Art career ==
Ocampo frequently revisits and makes reference to the art historical canon of political allegorists including Leon Golub, Géricault, Goya, Daumier with allusions to contemporary figures including political satirist R. Crumb Modernist painter Philip Guston. Ocampo's dark, often disturbing Gothic paintings are attributed with transforming horror into exquisite beauty, history into art history, purgatory into salvation. One of his pieces featuring several swastikas was censored at the Dokumenta art show in Kassel, Germany.

Manuel Ocampo has exhibited extensively throughout the 1990s, with solo exhibitions at galleries and institutions through Europe, Asia, and the Americas. In 2005, his work was the subject of a large-scale survey at Casa Asia in Barcelona, and Lieu d’Art Contemporain, Sigean, France.

Ocampo's work has been included in a number of international surveys, including the 2004 Seville Biennale, 2001 Venice Biennale, the 2001 Berlin Biennale, the 2000 Biennale d’art Contemporain de Lyon, the 1997 Kwangju Biennial, the 1993 Corcoran Biennial, and 1992's controversial Documenta IX. His work was featured in many group shows in the 1990s, including Helter Skelter: LA Art of the 1990s, at Museum of Contemporary Art, Los Angeles in 1992; Asia/America: Identities in Contemporary Asian American Art at the Asia Society, New York in 1994; American Stories: Amidst Displacement and Transformation at Setagaya Art Museum, Tokyo in 1997; Pop Surrealism at the Aldrich Museum of Artin 1998; and Made in California: Art, Image, and Identity, 1900-2000 at the Los Angeles County Museum of Art in 2000. He has received a number of prestigious grants and awards, including the Giverny Residency (1998), the Rome Prize at the American Academy (1995–96), National Endowment for the Arts (1996), Pollock-Krasner Foundation (1995) and Art Matters Inc. (1991).

Manuel Ocampo used to make art that criticized western colonialism through allegory and metaphor. Today, his work displays simple imagery; the artist has said of his 1990s work, "I was bored with that shit".

Phillip Rodriguez directed a one-hour documentary of Ocampo's life and art career, Manuel Ocampo, God Is My Copilot.

Ocampo's 1992 painting "Why I Hate Europeans" was used as the cover art to the music album "Mythmaker" by Skinny Puppy. Ocampo's art was also used for the album artwork for "Red Hot + Latin" - from the Red Hot series of benefit albums.
