= Mythmaker =

Studio album by Skinny Puppy
- Released: January 30, 2007
- Recorded: 2005–2006
- Genre: Electro-industrial
- Length: 48:56
- Label: Synthetic Symphony
- Producers: Mark Walk; cEvin Key; Ken Marshall

Skinny Puppy chronology
The Greater Wrong of the Right (2004)	Mythmaker (2007)	HanDover (2011)

Mythmaker is the tenth studio album by Canadian electro-industrial band Skinny Puppy. It was released on January 30, 2007, by Synthetic Symphony. Lead vocalist Nivek Ogre said the band took a simplified approach, but that it was a difficult record to make. It charted on a number of billboard charts, and received mostly positive reviews, with critics focusing on whether it was stylistically similar to previous albums.

Tracks from the album were featured in the Saw V soundtrack and Jackass video game. The band supported the album with the Mythrus Tour later the same year it was released.

== Background ==
Nivek Ogre stated that making the album was very difficult due to dealing with a personal relationship and other events in Los Angeles during the time the album was being made, but that those events were incorporated into the album itself. cEvin Key, while acknowledging Ogre's personal difficulties, said that while the extended writing process of the album could make one feel "stranded within your head space", having more time to write, and writing more songs than usual, helped the album.

"Pasturn"
"Pasturn" is an example of the album's "simplified" musical direction.

Ogre called style of the music on Mythmaker "simplified" and said the band "stayed truer to cEvin's compositions". He continued that the album had a new sound, but also retained elements of the "archetypal" Skinny Puppy sound, and the production was superior to previous albums. Key stated that he would write songs, and then send them to Mark Walk, who would make changes and send them back. Key said that it "open[ed] a door for me to hear it differently". Ogre said that the album's themes were control and mythology.

Mythmaker marks the third occasion on which a Skinny Puppy album cover was created by an artist other than long-time collaborator Steven R. Gilmore, though he continues to do the sleeve design and layout for the band. The cover uses a painting by Manuel Ocampo entitled "Why I Hate Europeans", which had been altered for the cover.

Ogre told Tom Lanham of The San Francisco Examiner that he believed Mythmaker to be "the best work he's done since 1990's definitive Too Dark Park".

== Release ==
Mythmaker was released on January 30, 2007. The album barely broke into the Billboard 200 at No. 200, but charted in three other Billboard charts, reaching No. 4 on the Independent Albums chart, No. 5 on the Dance/Electronic Albums Chart, and No. 17 on the Heatseekers Album chart. It peaked in all four charts in the same week of February 17, 2007.

The soundtrack for the 2008 movie Saw V featured the song "Ugli". It is the third time a Skinny Puppy song has been used on a soundtrack for a Saw film, with Saw II and Saw IV previously including tracks by the band. The song "Politikil" was featured in the Jackass video game.

The "Mythrus Tour", the title of the Skinny Puppy tour in support of Mythmaker, took place in 2007 in North America and Europe. The live band consisted of Ogre (vocals and theatrics), Key (keyboards and electronics), and Justin Bennett (percussion). "Mythrus" was originally intended to be spelled "Myth-R-Us", according to Ogre, who stated "the word Mythrus; I wanted it 'Myth-R-Us,' like 'Toys-R-Us.' That idea got shot down, though." He also said that while the tour was going to be more intimate rather than a spectacle, he still wanted it to be theatrical.

== Critical reception ==
Professional ratings
Review scores
Source	Rating
AllMusic	3.5/5 stars
Alternative Press	3.5/5
Billboard	Favorable
Montreal Gazette	3.5/5 stars
Now	4/5 stars
Release Magazine	7/10
Revolver	3/5 stars
Sputnikmusic	3.5/5
The Tampa Tribune	B+
Zero Music Magazine	10/10

Opinions about the album varied between claims of both little and significant change from previous work. Greg Prato of AllMusic said of Mythmaker, "Skinny Puppy always aligned themselves more with electro-dance, and they continue to do so". He goes on to say that "Nivek Ogre and cEvin Key obviously know what their following wants to hear", and finishes by reiterating, "Not a lot has changed in the world of Skinny Puppy circa Mythmaker".

Christa Titus of Billboard said, "...Mythmaker radiates impending doom". She notes that certain elements leave the listener "to appreciate how beautiful Skinny Puppy can be when it follows a more emotive, ambient trail", but comments that there are some "industrial chargers" as well. Writing for The Tampa Tribune, John W. Allman described the album as "hard, industrial noise that's both challenging and accessible". In a review for Zero Music Magazine, Gustaf Molin praised the album for Key's sound design and Ogre's vocal work, calling it "a masterpiece".

Ilker Yücel of ReGen Magazine said "Mythmaker certainly continues along the path paved by The Greater Wrong of the Right, representing an embrace of modern electronic music and pushing it to its limits". Discussing individual songs, he said the first track, "Maginifishit", was "a testament to Mark Walk's impressive abilities to use Ogre's voice as an instrument unto itself". Yücel stated that "Jaher" is "full of dark atmosphere that is at once soothing and nightmarish" and called it "arguably the best track" on the album. He called "Politikil" "a somewhat more rock & roll type of track" with "chugs and churns of overdriven synths and guitar-like tones, and a rocking rhythm" that is "sure to be a highlight when played live". Yücel also said, "Many will still chide the band for not returning to the sound of past successes like Last Rights or Too Dark Park, but it's this type of purist viewpoint that ultimately stagnates a band's progress".

Jarosław Jerry Szprot of Metal Storm, in comparing the album to their previous release, said "Mythmaker is basically more of the same". He stated that while the band was doing a lot of experimenting, something was still missing, but continued that newcomers would probably find the album quite interesting and original. Trey Spencer of Sputnikmusic described the album as a blend of elements from many of their previous albums, and also said it would be a good first album for new listeners to buy.

Erika Szabo of Rocknworld said, "Skinny Puppy provides listeners with more of the same thing with the slightest of changes". She was positive about half the songs, but called the other half "less stimulating". She also said the album was "expansive and expressive... even if... recycled".

== Track listing ==
All music is composed by Ogre, Key, and Walk.

No.	Title	Length
1.	"Magnifishit"	4:31
2.	"Dal"	4:45
3.	"Haze"	5:28
4.	"Pedafly"	5:37
5.	"Jaher"	5:14
6.	"Politikil"	4:22
7.	"Lestiduz"	4:11
8.	"Pasturn"	3:48
9.	"Ambiantz"	4:27
10.	"Ugli"	6:33
Total length:		48:56

Vinyl-only bonus tracks
No.	Title	Length
11.	"Politikil" (Extended Mix)	5:58
12.	"Optimissed" (The Humble Brothers Remix)	4:30
13.	"Pedafly" (Husky Remix)	7:37
Total length:		66:05

== Personnel ==
Credits adapted from Mythmaker liner notes

Skinny Puppy

- Nivek Ogre – vocals, keyboards
- cEvin Key – synthesizers, keyboards, drums, production
- Mark Walk – synthesizers, bass, guitar, production

Additional musicians

- Dre "Databomb" Robinson – percussion (tracks 2 and 10)
- Saki Kaskas – acoustic guitar (track 5), guitar (track 12)
- Traz Damji – piano, synth (track 5 and 12)

Technical personnel

- Ken "Hiwatt" Marshall – synthesizers, electronics (tracks 5, 6, and 8), production, mixing
- Otto von Schirach – sound design (track 7)
- Stephen Marcussen – mastering
- Steven R. Gilmore – art direction, design
- Manuel Ocampo – artwork

== Chart positions ==
Chart (2007)	Peak position
US Billboard 200	200
US Top Dance Albums (Billboard)	5
US Independent Albums (Billboard)	17
US Heatseekers Albums (Billboard)	4
