= Back and Forth 06Six =

Compilation album by Skinny Puppy
- Released: 2003
- Recorded: 1982–1983, 1985, 1988–1989, 1992–1994, 2000
- Genre: Industrial
- Label: Subconscious Communications
- Producer: cEvin Key

Skinny Puppy chronology
Puppy Gristle (2002)	Back and Forth 06Six (2003)	The Greater Wrong of the Right (2004)

Back and Forth 06Six is an album of previously unavailable Skinny Puppy material released through cEvin Key's Subconscious Communications in early 2003. The CD had two releases, each with different artwork and cases though the audio content was the same. Both releases were limited to 1500 copies.

"Hardset Head" was originally to appear on the Doomsday - Back and Forth 5 album but was pulled due to copyright issues.

== Track listing ==
No.	Title	Length
1.	"Meat Flavoured Factor"	6:39
2.	"Brak Yaletown"	5:52
3.	"Ambient Fruit"	7:05
4.	"The Poison Mouth"	3:58
5.	"Schrimpz"	3:56
6.	"Interview"	1:03
7.	"Brassy Excellence"	4:02
8.	"Morphous (v2)"	5:12
9.	"Subskull"	4:33
10.	"HateKILL (v2 extended version)"	8:36
11.	"Hardset Head (live in Dresden)"	4:13
12.	"Scared"	2:13

=== Track notes ===
- Meat Flavoured Factor - Originally recorded 1982. The first track made with the name Skinny Puppy. Special Guest: J. Vizvary.
- Brak Yaletown - Originally recorded 1983. Recorded in Yaletown Vancouver. Possible Guest: Bill_Leeb (Bass synth)
- Ambient Fruit - Originally recorded 1985. Created as part of an opening act for Chris & Cosey but went unperformed. A newer version was put on Key's 2003 solo album The Dragon Experience.
- The Poison Mouth - Originally recorded 1993. Created during the group's first meeting with Mark Walk and an experiment with a Serge Modular. Dedicated to Frank Tovey.
- Schrimpz - Originally recorded 1988. A demo created by cEvin and Dwayne that somehow got overlooked and discarded.
- Interview - Originally recorded 1985. A debate between Skinny Puppy and a radio host.
- Brassy Excellence - Originally recorded 1989. A demo created by cEvin and Dwayne that somehow got overlooked and discarded.
- Morphous (v2) - Originally made 1994, Assembled 2003. 7 versions of this track were made and in the end discarded. Assembled from pieces made during sessions for The Process album. A rumoured track on the unreleased single for "Candle".
- Subskull - Originally recorded 1992, Edited 2003. A demo created by cEvin and Dwayne that somehow got overlooked and discarded. An introduction by Dwayne from 1994 was added to the beginning.
- HateKILL (v2 extended version) - Originally made 1994, Assembled 2003. A demo track made multiple times only to be discarded and unused. Reassembled from over 12 different versions.
- Hardset Head (live in Dresden) - Originally recorded 2000. This was to be released on Doomsday - Back and Forth 5 but was removed due to legal issues at the last minute.
- Scared - Originally recorded 1994. A discarded demo from sessions for The Process album. All vocals by Ogre.
