= HanDover =

Studio album by Skinny Puppy
- Released: 25 October 2011
- Recorded: 2008–2011 at Subconscious Studios
- Genre: Electro-industrial, noise, glitch, IDM
- Label: SPV GmbH
- Producer: Skinny Puppy

Skinny Puppy chronology
Mythmaker (2007)	HanDover (2011)	Weapon (2013)

Professional ratings
Review scores
Source	Rating
AllMusic	3.5/5 stars
Consequence of Sound	C+
Exclaim!	(Favorable)
Sputnikmusic	3.5/5

HanDover is the eleventh studio album by Canadian electro-industrial band Skinny Puppy. It was released on October 25th, 2011, through SPV_GmbH.

After 2007's Mythmaker and its accompanying tour, the band returned to work on a new album in 2008. This new material was noise music, in the vein of Lou Reed's Metal Machine Music and was initially intended to be "handed over" to their Hannover label in time for their 2009 international tour. Trouble arose, however, when their label, SPV GmbH, ran into insolvency problems and the album's fate became uncertain. Rather than cancel all plans, the 2009 tour went on as planned and was named In Solvent See to reflect the events occurring at SPV. Ogre has suggested that this "handing over" of albums and assets inspired the album's title. Still under contract and unable to release the album until SPV's financial issues were sorted, Skinny Puppy continued work on the production of their album.

While some material originally intended for the aborted noise album evolved into the songs "Brownstone" and "Noisex", Mark Walk and Ogre took their noise ideas and further developed them for the ohGr album unDeveloped.

In early 2011, Sasha Coon, Skinny Puppy's former live crew member and friend died inspiring the song "Ashas" which is dedicated to Sasha's memory.

In May 2011, Skinny Puppy announced that they had finished recording their new album and that they were soliciting it to record labels in hopes of securing a September 2011 release date, though its release date would eventually be confirmed as October 25 in the United States and an October 28, 2011 release in Europe.

== Track listing ==
No.	Title	Length
1.	"Ovirt"	4:51
2.	"Cullorblind"	5:48
3.	"Wavy"	4:34
4.	"Ashas"	3:30
5.	"Gambatte"	3:25
6.	"Icktums"	5:16
7.	"Point"	3:38
8.	"Brownstone"	3:28
9.	"Vyrisus"	4:07
10.	"Village"	4:09
11.	"Noisex"	7:14
Total length:		49:47

== Personnel ==
- Ogre – vocals, synths
- cEvin Key – synths, percussion, electronics, guitar, theremin
- Mark Walk – programming, bass, guitar
- Ken "Hiwatt" Marshall – programming, synths, FX
- Traz Damji – additional programming, synths
- Saki Kaskas – guitar

== Chart positions ==
Chart (2011)	Peak position
US Billboard 200	168
US Top Dance Albums (Billboard)	9
US Heatseekers Albums (Billboard)	3
US Independent Albums (Billboard)	37
US Indie Store Album Sales (Billboard)	18
