= Back and Forth Series Two =

Compilation album by Skinny Puppy
- Released: 13 October 1992
- Recorded: 1983–1984
- Genre: Industrial
- Length: 71:20
- Label: Nettwerk
- Producer: cEvin Key

Skinny Puppy chronology
Twelve Inch Anthology (1990)	Back and Forth Series Two (1992)	Brap: Back and Forth Series 3 & 4 (1996)

Back and Forth Series Two is a compilation album by industrial band Skinny Puppy. It consists of the entire Back and Forth release remixed from the original four-track tapes, including raw live recordings and studio rarities.

== Track listing ==
No.	Title	Length
1.	"Intro" (Live in Winnipeg)	2:06
2.	"Sleeping Beast"	5:57
3.	"K-9"	3:40
4.	"Monster Radio Man"	2:22
5.	"Quiet Solitude"	4:44
6.	"The Pit"	5:18
7.	"Sore in a Masterpiece / Dead of Winter"	13:44
8.	"Unovis on a Stick"	2:40
9.	"To a Baser Nature"	2:51
10.	"A.M. / Meat Flavour"	1:47
11.	"My Voice Sounds Like Shit"	2:28
12.	"Smothered Hope" (Demo)	7:21
13.	"Explode the P.A." (Live Brap)	10:06
14.	"Assimilate" (Original Inst. Demo)	3:04
15.	"Edge of Insanity"	4:48

There is an untitled improvisational piece that appears before "Smothered Hope (demo)", and lasts just over two minutes long.

== Personnel ==
cEvin Key - keyboard, drumbox, tape, effekt [sic], voice. Nivek Ogre - voice, lyrik. Guitar on K-9 by Greg Monk (uncredited).
