= Politikil =

Song by Skinny Puppy

Single by Skinny Puppy

from the album Mythmaker
- Released: 2007
- Genre: Post-industrial
- Length: 10:18
- Label: Synthetic Symphony
- Songwriter(s): Kevin Crompton, Kevin Ogilvie, Mark Walk, Kenneth Marshall
- Producer(s): Ken 'Hiwatt' Marshall and cEvin Key

Skinny Puppy singles chronology
| "Track 10" (2000) | "Politikil" (2007) | "Salvo" (2013) |

Audio sample
- file; help

"Politikil" is a single by the band Skinny Puppy from the album Mythmaker.

== Use in other media ==
"Politikil" was featured in the Jackass video game.

== Reception ==
One reviewer described the song as sounding "like it was composed by Giorgio Moroder on an acid trip". Ilker Yücel from ReGen Magazine said the extended version of the song "offers no surprises" but called the song itself one of Skinny Puppy's most accessible.

== Track listing ==
| No. | Title | Length |
|---|---|---|
| 1. | "Politikil (Humble Brothers Remix)" | 5:57 |
| 2. | "Politikil (Album Version)" | 4:21 |

== Chart positions ==
| Chart (2007) | Peak position |
|---|---|
| Deutsche Alternative Charts – Singles | 1 |
