= Back & Forth (EP) =

EP by Skinny Puppy
- Released: 1984
- Recorded: November 1983 – January 1984
- Genre: Synthpop, electro-industrial, dark ambient
- Length: 28:05
- Producer: cEvin Key

Skinny Puppy chronology
Back & Forth (1984)	Remission (1984)

Back & Forth is the self-published debut EP by Skinny Puppy, released in 1984. It was supposed to be a limited edition of 50 copies but only 35 were actually made. The first 15 copies were dubbed at a normal speed, while the remaining 20 were dubbed at a high speed, making them slightly inferior to the first 15. This album was remastered and rereleased in 1992 as Back and Forth Series Two, with additional tracks.

The album's front and back covers are illustrations of aliens from the book UFOs Past, Present, and Future by Robert Emenegger. The inner sleeve includes a detail of George Tooker's 1950 painting Subway.

== Track listing (original release) ==
Side A
No.	Title	Length
1.	"Sleeping Beast"	5:46
2.	"K-9"	3:37
3.	"Quiet Solitude"	4:45
Total length:		14:08

Side B
No.	Title	Length
1.	"The Pit"	3:22
2.	"Dead of Winter"	7:15
3.	"A.M./Meat Flavour"	1:50
4.	"Edge of Insanity"	1:30
Total length:		13:57

== Personnel ==
Credits adapted from cassette liner notes.

- cEvin Key – keyboard, drumbox, tape, effekt, voice; engineering and production (2–7)
- Nivek Ogre – voice, lyrics
- Rave - engineering and production (1)
