= Brap: Back and Forth Series 3 & 4 =

Brap: Back & Forth Series 3 & 4

Compilation album by Skinny Puppy
- Released: 30 April 1996
- Recorded: 1983–1986, 1990–1992
- Genre: Industrial
- Length: 104:04
- Label: Nettwerk/EMI Records; 0670 0 30103 2 0 W2-30103
- Producer: cEvin Key

Skinny Puppy chronology
Back and Forth Series 2 (1992)	Brap: Back & Forth Series 3 & 4 (1996)	The Process (1996)

Alternative cover
- Digital Brap

Professional ratings
Review scores
Source	Rating
AllMusic	3/5 stars

Brap: Back & Forth Series 3 & 4 is a compilation album by industrial band Skinny Puppy. It was released as a double-CD in 1996. This album reached to #9 in Billboard chart's Top Heatseekers. Disc one is largely instrumental demos (only two tracks feature vocals and a few others vocal samples) whereas Disc two is composed mainly of live cuts (with only two or three studio tracks). The cover art was created by Dave McKean. The CD also features enhanced CD content including a 3D style VR interface based on the Too Dark Park album and a virtual walk through the art of the Spasmolytic single.

== Track listing ==
Disc one "Back"
No.	Title	Length
2.	"Jackhammer"	4:18
3.	"Splasher"	3:51
4.	"Double Cross"	5:31
5.	"Yo Yo Scrape"	4:39
6.	"Carry"	5:18
7.	"Guilty"	3:13
8.	"The Soul That Creates"	4:03
9.	"Brap" (Live 21 October 1986)	3:03
10.	"Sparkless"	3:01
11.	"Dead Doll" (Demo Version)	2:17
12.	"Deadlines" (Demo Version)	4:42
13.	"Last Call" (Live in CBC Radio studios, 29 September 1986, although in an edited version.)	6:05

Disc two "Forth"
No.	Title	Length
2.	"Uranus Cancelled" (Stripped down instrumental version of "Knowhere?" from the Last Rights album)	4:21
3.	"All Eyes" (Live improvisation from the tour for the Too Dark Park album; edited from "Walking on Ice" track from Spasmolytic Single.)	6:07
4.	"Reclamation" (Live 14 December 1990 at the LA Palladium, recorded by a fan)	2:57
5.	"Spasmolytic" (Rough mix)	3:54
6.	"Grave Wisdom" (Rough mix)	3:42
7.	"Tin Omen" (Beginning minutes live 3 November 1990 (from the Heaven's Trash live bootleg), the rest of the song is live 14 December 1990)	6:15
8.	"Gods Gift" (Live 14 December 1990)	4:47
9.	"Convulsion" (Live 14 December 1990)	3:10
10.	"Nature's Revenge" (Rough mix)	3:58
11.	"Love In Vein" (Studio remix, possibly unfinished. Rumored to have been a track on the deleted single for the song.)	6:56
12.	"TFWO" (Live 14 December 1990)	4:17
13.	"Choralone" (Live 14 December 1990. Different lyrics from the studio version.)	3:39

European pressings include "Left Handshake", the omitted track from Last Rights, in between TFWO and Choralone, excluding the data tracks on both discs.
