= ReGen Magazine =

Website dedicated to electronic and industrial music

- Website type: News and reviews
- Owner: Ilker Yücel
- Website: regenmag.com
- Launched: 2001
- Current status: Active

ReGen Magazine (commonly known as ReGen) is a music news website, initially launched in 2001. It primarily focuses on various electronic-oriented genres via providing news postings, music reviews, artist interviews, and editorial content.

== History ==
In the early 2000s, University of Kentucky student Nick Garland worked at the WRFL radio station. Shortly after, he launched ReGen Magazine as an outlet to cover electronic music (plus its associated subgenres) and the overall goth subculture. Garland also joined the staff at Industrialnation, an industrial music magazine/website, although his focus shifted to ReGen when Industrialnation's activities started to gradually diminish. ReGen's popularity increased throughout the 2000s, as exclusive interviews and dedicated content continued to emerge. In 2009, Garland passed down ownership of the website to Ilker Yücel (who initially joined as a staff member in 2004).

In late 2010, ReGen experienced a simultaneous hard drive failure and website hack. Two months into 2011, Yücel permanently relaunched the website. Although a large batch of previous content became lost, ReGen was given a complete redesign. In December 2023, in order to cover server costs and general maintenance (the staff members at ReGen are not paid journalists), a Patreon was launched, offering consistent updates and content to subscribers.

ReGen was at the helm of the Die Warzau tribute album Big Hit Radio, released in early 2025. The album featured cover versions and remixes from over a dozen artists. Profits went towards the National Center for Transgender Equality.

== Content ==
ReGen mainly covers a large array of subgenres, such as industrial rock, coldwave, post-punk, dark ambient, industrial metal, synthpop, dark wave, noise rock, gothic rock, grindcore, electro-industrial, baggy, electronic rock, and gabber (in addition to occasional coverage of other alternative genres such as post-hardcore and metalcore). Along with Yücel and Garland, ReGen has included other notable contributors over the years, with Vlad McNeally (designer for various artists such as Front Line Assembly and Cubanate) and Trever Aeon (a professional wrestler who went on to work in AEW and WWN) as a few examples.

In addition to typical news postings, ReGen also posts photoshoots, music reviews, and interviews. ReGen has conducted interviews with a number of musicians. During the first few years of the site's existence, ReGen interviewed artists such as KMFDM, Flesh Field, Acumen Nation, Chemlab, Skinny Puppy, Devo, Chris Vrenna, among many others.

After the website's overhaul in 2011, additional artists interviewed by ReGen included Peter Hook, Prong, Julien-K, Stabbing Westward, The Joy Thieves, Filter, Rorschach Test, and numerous others.

ReGen has also been a supporter of specific festivals and concerts, such as Vampire Freaks' Dark Force Fest and CrackNation Records' Cold Waves Festival. Cold Waves was initially launched in 2012 as a tribute to Acumen Nation/DJ? Acucrack member Jamie Duffy, who committed suicide one month beforehand. The festival brought together a number of bands in the electronic/industrial genre, some of whom had reunited at the event. In addition, compilation albums that featured the performing bands were typically issued as a series too; profits went towards charities and causes, such as Hope for the Day and Darkest Before Dawn. Cold Waves became a yearly occurrence afterwards, with ReGen supporting and covering each iteration.
