= Last Rights (album) =

Studio album by Skinny Puppy
- Released: March 1992
- Recorded: 1991–1992
- Studio: 1169 Nelson Street and Mushroom Studios in Vancouver, British Columbia
- Genre: Electro-industrial; noise
- Length: 52:54
- Label: Nettwerk
- Producer: Dave Ogilvie; cEvin Key

Skinny Puppy chronology
Too Dark Park (1990)	Last Rights (1992)	The Process (1996)

Singles from Last Rights
- 1. "Inquisition" Released: March 24, 1992; 2. "Track 10" Released: August 20, 2000

Last Rights is the seventh studio album by Canadian electro-industrial band Skinny Puppy. It was released in March 1992 as the group's final record distributed through Nettwerk. Last Rights saw the band experimenting with two opposite extremes: cacophonous heavy music and gloomy melodies, resulting in moments of industrial weight as well as moments of uncharacteristic softness. Along with containing some of the band's most impenetrable walls of sound and an eleven-minute track composed almost entirely of manipulated and distorted samples, Last Rights also features Skinny Puppy's first ballad.

The album's production was troubled both internally and externally, involving tension within the band and threatened litigation from without. After its release, it was followed by Skinny Puppy's last tour for twelve years. Despite Last Rights' difficulties, it was well-received and named by Alternative Press as one of the best albums of the 1990s. It spawned two singles, "Inquisition" in 1993 and "Left Handshake" (distributed under the title "Track 10") in 2000, and was the band's first release to chart on the Billboard 200.

== Background and production ==
"Ogre is a different person from what I first knew, and I just can't bear to deal with it. It's something that I have to walk away from. So, unfortunately, I can probably see [Last Rights] as the last record we do because there's just no change."

— cEvin Key on the troubled production of Last Rights.

After Skinny Puppy released Too Dark Park in 1990, internal stress began to take its toll on the band. cEvin Key and Dwayne Goettel believed that vocalist Nivek Ogre was more interested in pursuing his solo career than maintaining Skinny Puppy, and his abuse of drugs (specifically injected cocaine and heroin) exacerbated the schism. Manager Mark Jowett recalled the time, saying, "They internally combusted to some degree". Though the band was still functional and able to record music, much of the friendliness was gone when it came time to work on Last Rights. Dave Ogilvie, longtime producer and temporary member of Skinny Puppy during the 1988 VIVIsectVI sessions, acted as a middleman between the two halves of the band. First, he would record with Goettel and Key, and afterwards he would bring Ogre in and work with him in isolation. This disconnect between Last Rights' instrumental composition and vocal recording would prove vital to its discordant sound.

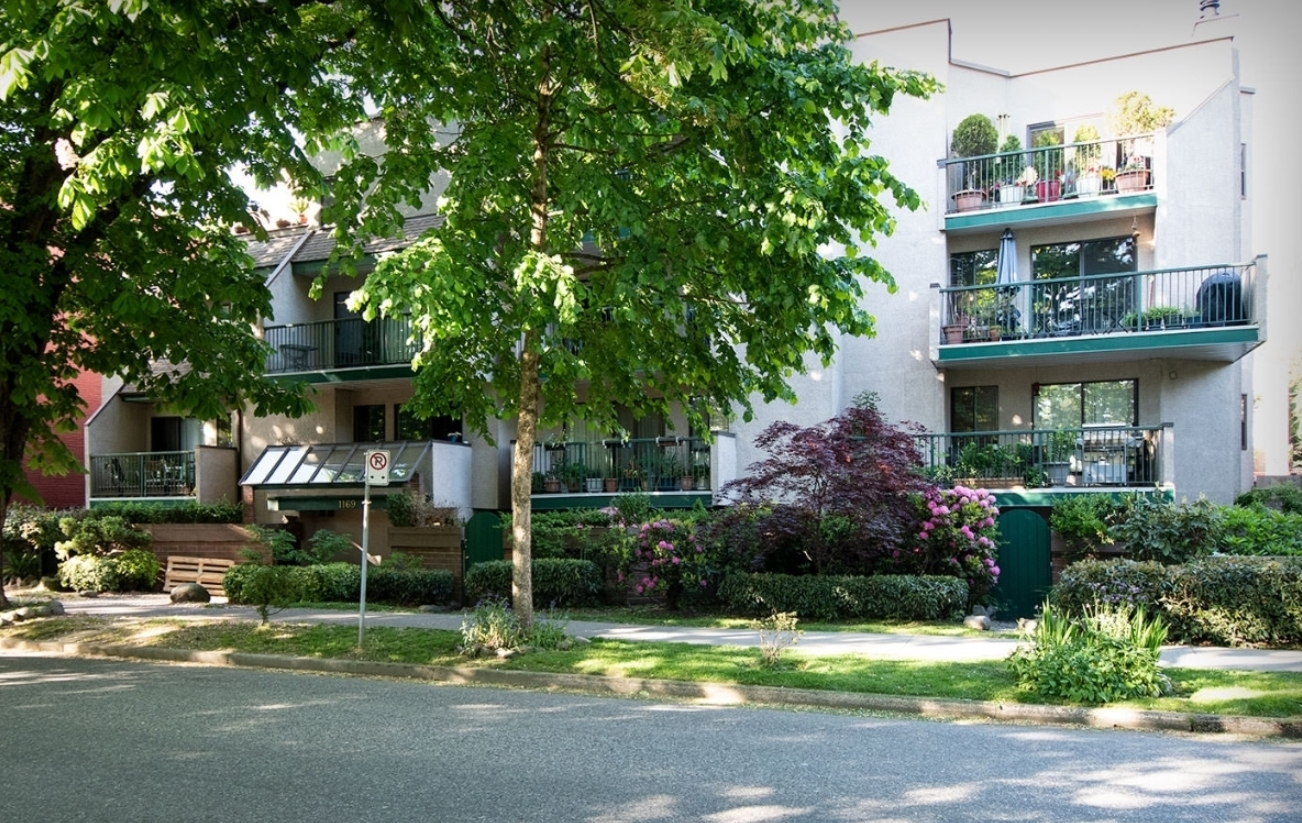
1169 Nelson Street in Vancouver, British Columbia, one of the sites of Last Rights' recording

Ogre conceived of and recorded all of his lyrics in the studio with minimal planning. He considered the vocals a "train of consciousness" that powerfully reflected him in the moment. Key and Goettel also recorded their part of the music in-studio; about the process, Key said, "I think with [Last Rights], it was our opportunity to just let the album create itself by the collective energies involved". Because the band had access to new equipment, Key and Goettel spent more time on the post-production of Last Rights than on any other Skinny Puppy album, specifically on noisy and complicated songs like "Scrapyard" and "Download".

Many of the songs on the second half of Last Rights are either instrumental or feature protracted instrumental segments. According to Key, Ogre intended to finish more vocals than he did, but the state of him and the band cut the sessions short. Ogre reached the apex of his "functional drug addiction" during the album's recording, and Key and Goettel were fearful for his life. Ogre experienced vivid, drug- and insomnia-induced hallucinations in the studio, leading to what he called the "best sessions" of recording. Often these intense experiences would end with him being taken to the hospital. After his third seizure, which occurred while he was recording background vocals to the song "Knowhere?", and after contracting Hepatitis A, Ogre decided to drop narcotics and check himself into rehab. He remained there until Skinny Puppy embarked on a tour of North America. Following the release of Last Rights (which Ogre considered a document of his collapse) and its subsequent tour, Ogre was clean and the band was functioning, but the future of Skinny Puppy remained unclear.

=== "Left Handshake" ===
Last Rights' production encountered more problems when its tenth track was faced with legal action. The song in question, "Left Handshake", featured vocal samples of Timothy Leary from his 1967 release Turn On, Tune In, Drop Out. Because so much of the album's lyrics were about drugs and drug abuse, Key wanted the final statement of Last Rights to be his and Goettel's take on the issue. Key considered "Left Handshake" as a "last argument" that "really rounded off the album". What resulted was a sort of back-and-forth between the cut samples and the vocals of Ogre, who construed the sound bites as an attack on his addiction. The band obtained Leary's permission to use his voice, but Henry G. Saperstein, owner of the copyright, threatened to sue Skinny Puppy if they released the song. As a result, "Left Handshake" was taken off Last Rights, and many releases of the album preserve the tenth track slot as blank. Despite this, the song was a staple of 1992's live sets. "Left Handshake" would not see a release until eight years later when it was distributed in a limited capacity under the title "Track 10".

== Composition and content ==
"It was extremely brutal right off the bat and not very easy for anyone to listen to. [...] Last Rights is the way that things feel right now, and definitely the mood that Ogre's in when he's around. [...] However unpopular the sound may be, and very not inviting and just so ugly... It was uglier than I thought."

— Dwayne Goettel reflecting on the sound of Last Rights.

Often described as Skinny Puppy's darkest and most experimental work, Last Rights is a notably heavy, bleak, and dense album. It still retains the band's electro-industrial roots and even has some dance aspects, but those elements give way to a heavy emphasis on walls of noise, atonal and highly distorted percussion, Ogre's agonized screaming, and, alternatively, moments of unusual melodicism. The phrase "audio sculpture" has been used to refer to the sound of Last Rights. On the album, the group's employment of samples was refined and, according to Tim DiGravina of AllMusic, put to better use than on past releases. Compared to Skinny Puppy's previous work, Last Rights is a more internal and personal album, with some publications seeing it as prophetic of the band's eventual demise. Ogre called the release his "document of delusion" and said that it captured the absolute height of the worst, most painful moments of his life. Because of the close nature of Ogre's contributions, no lyrics were printed on the liner notes.

The album begins with the track "Love in Vein", which was intended to be a 12-inch single but never saw individual release. Musically, the song starts with reversed and slow-motion samples before transitioning into a driving drum machine loop underlain with Ogre's rasped vocals. As with much of the album, "Love in Vein" features a number of aural layers, such as samples from "Revolution 9" by the Beatles. Halfway through the song, extremely distorted and downtuned clips of Ogre's vocals are introduced. Last Rights' second song and Skinny Puppy's first ballad, "Killing Game", is one of the group's more well-known and atypical tracks, and Ogre said it rivaled 1989's "Worlock" as the best Skinny Puppy song. It features melodic piano, a slow tempo with pounding percussion, and mournful vocals. Despite not being released as a single, "Killing Game" was the only song off of the album to receive a music video.

"Love in Vein"
"Love in Vein's" ending showcases Ogre's agonized vocal performance.

"Knowhere?"
"Knowhere?" highlights Last Rights' noisy and layered production.

"Mirror Saw"
"Mirror Saw" is an example of the album's moments of melancholy.

The album's third track, "Knowhere?", is one of Skinny Puppy's darkest and heaviest. Sputnikmusic wrote that the percussion at the beginning of the song "seems to be created through the combination of an explosion and a gunshot". Though almost all of the industrial metal influence that Al Jourgensen brought into Skinny Puppy with the 1989 album Rabies is absent on Last Rights, "Knowhere?" includes slow, chugging electric guitar buried beneath the distorted drums and shrieked vocals. The track peaks at a moment when the instruments build to complete, nearly indiscernible noise. In 1992, Sandra Garcia of B Side magazine wrote that the song "stopped her dead three times", making her put the album down. She continued, saying, "With the fourth try I realized it really was listening to someone going through hell". The next song, "Mirror Saw", is a quieter, more morose track built around stilted drum clips and warbling, distant synthesizer sounds. It began as a demo recorded by Goettel to which the rest of the band later added live drums and additional sounds.

"Inquisition" marks Last Rights' midpoint and stands as its primary single. Despite being a propulsive, sample-heavy, pounding industrial dance track, it still acts as a lull from the album's chaos. AllMusic's John Bush saw the song as the album's pinnacle, calling it a "heart-stopping single whose production contributed just as much to the air of menace as Ogre's vocals". Jon Selzer of Melody Maker described the song as a "utopian lament". The sixth song, "Scrapyard", is another assault of unconventional noises with jarring rhythmic stops, contrasting periods of acoustic guitar with growled vocals and relentlessly pounding kick drums. Key considered "Scrapyard" one of the album's more exciting tracks. It features a sample from John Hughes' 1989 film Uncle Buck. "Riverz End", the album's first instrumental piece, combines two tracks from Rabies, "Rivers" and "Choralone". Key intended the song to be one more break from cacophony, and Selzer deemed it another instance of hopeful sorrow. Diana Valois of The Morning Call called "Riverz End" pretty but compared it to a foul pool spiked with needles and rusted junk in the same breath.

"Lust Chance", another largely instrumental song, provides an eerie combination of pornographic audio samples, reverberating and repetitious bass drums, and manipulated electronic sounds. Like "Scrapyard", "Lust Chance" contains a sample from Uncle Buck, as well as one from Vancouver radio station CKLG 730. Last Rights' ninth and penultimate track, "Circustance", begins with more gloomily optimistic sounds and quickly descends into loud percussion drowning out Ogre's agonized mumbles. About this song, Valois wrote, "carnival and cartoon giddiness, pig-like snorts and speedway radio static blip by, only to end in a soothing mantra of wind blowing over glass bottles or Peruvian pan pipes." Like many tracks from the album, "Circustance" spawned from an in-studio jam. The last song of the album, "Download", stands in place of the original closing track, "Left Handshake". It is entirely derived from manipulated samples and features little to no rhythm. Ogre compared "Download" to a flatline. Key and Goettel went on to form the band Download, which expanded upon the song's early experimentation. About the track, Key said, "Dwayne and Anthony [Valcic] sat up for like fourteen hours just editing, and that’s not including the manufacturing of the sounds they did. They had collected that over a period of two months. So there’s a lot of work where people might think ‘oh, that’s just a synthesizer or a patch.’ But it's actually several hundred synthesizer patches."

== Live performances ==
A shot from the Last Rights backing footage showing Nivek Ogre in makeup

In May 1992, Skinny Puppy embarked on a North American tour with Godflesh and Thought Industry as opening acts. The stage show for Last Rights was less overtly violent and grotesque than on previous Skinny Puppy tours, focusing instead on coming to terms with negative emotions. During 1990's Too Dark Park tour, the band played clips from the Guinea Pig series of Japanese horror films and were surprised by the audience reactions; apparently, many perceived the gruesome images as real. Ogre, dismayed by fans who enjoyed the explicit gore for the wrong reasons, wanted to shift the band's live tone to something more conceptual and introspective. He considered the Last Rights tour as a maturation, and thought of those 1992 performances as dark inward looks. Tim Gore, the band's manager and assistant in designing the Too Dark Park shows, helped Ogre come up with the more nuanced set of theatrics, resulting in Skinny Puppy's most ambitious and prop-heavy tour.

Nivek Ogre performing live with Skinny Puppy in 1992

In preparation for the upcoming Last Rights shows, Ogre and William Morrison recorded and edited sixty-six minutes of backing video to sync up with the live performances. This footage was recorded at the same time as the "Killing Game" music video, which was intended to be a sample of the live show. Meanwhile, Gore was designing and fabricating the tour's many props and Ogre's many costumes. The two main elements, a virtual reality machine and a spinning display of severed heads called the Tree of No Cares, were set up on either side of the stage. The VR apparatus, into which Ogre occasionally went throughout the performance, represented his addiction and eventually came to mutate him. The backing film was timed so that whenever Ogre entered the machine, his face would appear onscreen and the audience could watch as something attacked and tortured him. Each time Ogre emerged from the apparatus, he would be altered. Gore also designed an elaborate full-body suit known as the Guiltman. Only appearing for the performance of "Left Handshake" at the end of each show, the Guiltman combined imagery of drug abuse and deformed sexuality to represent Ogre at the lowest point of addiction.

On June 8, 1992, at a concert in Boston, a number of people in the crowd jumped on stage and stole some of Ogre's props. Gore pursued a thief and was himself punched by a security guard. Gore, who had difficulty breathing after the impact, was taken to the hospital, and the guard was fired.

Songs performed

Bites

- "Assimilate"
- "The Choke"

Cleanse Fold and Manipulate

- "Addiction"
- "Anger"
- "Second Tooth"

VIVIsectVI

- "Harsh Stone White"
- "Testure"
- "VX Gas Attack"

Rabies

- "Tin Omen"
- "Worlock"

Too Dark Park

- "Spasmolytic"

Last Rights

- "Love in Vein"
- "Killing Game"
- "Knowhere?"
- "Circustance"
- "Left Handshake"

Improvisations

- "Dirty Tricks"

== Release ==
In March 1992, Last Rights was released. Much like the album's production, its launch was fraught with issues. Initial pressings of the disc in Australia were flawed in that the track divisions were off by four seconds, meaning the first four seconds were missing from the album and the last four were silent. Other copies released in North America had the same issue, but heightened to thirty-nine seconds, resulting in wholly nonsensical track divisions. Nettwerk and Capitol Records quickly distributed a corrected run of copies with "Quality Controlled" stickers. Some Canadian prints of Last Rights mistakenly featured the CD art from "Tormentor" (1990), a single off of Skinny Puppy's previous album, Too Dark Park. Despite these troubles, Last Rights was the group's first album to chart on the Billboard 200, peaking at position 193 and becoming Skinny Puppy's most popular release at the time.

Last Rights' release was preceded by the "Inquisition" single, which came out on March 24, 1992, and included a B-side, "Lahuman8", which was created at the request of the dance group La La La Human Steps. "Love in Vein" was planned as the album's second single and prepared for release, complete with remixes and B-sides, but was ultimately canceled. Some of the material intended for the 12-inch was later released on Skinny Puppy's 1996 compilation Brap: Back and Forth Series 3 & 4. Ultimately, Last Rights did not receive a second single until 2000, when "Left Handshake", the song cut from the album due to legal concerns, was issued in a limited capacity under the title "Track 10". One thousand copies were pressed, and they were sold at Skinny Puppy's reformation concert in Germany.

=== Critical reception ===
Professional ratings
Review scores
Source	Rating
AllMusic	4/5 stars
Entertainment Weekly	B+
Los Angeles Times	3/4 stars
Melody Maker	Very favorable
The Morning Call	Favorable
Select	3/5 stars
Sputnikmusic	4/5

Last Rights was met with positive reception. John Bush of AllMusic considered the album Skinny Puppy's technical and artistic peak, going so far as to call it a "sonic masterpiece" that was "ten years ahead of its time". Writing for Entertainment Weekly, Jim Farber praised the album's ugly intensity as well as its rare moments of melody. Jonathan Gold of the Los Angeles Times wrote that Skinny Puppy "plays dance music that nobody dances to and bellows gloomy manifestos that no one understands". Gold went on to call Last Rights an "enormously ambitious work" that mostly pulls it off. Sputnikmusic appreciated how challenging the album was and admired that the band, despite being on the brink of dissolution, managed to pull together such an impressive work. Jon Selzer of Melody Maker called Last Rights "morbidly fascinating, unaccountably beautiful, and their best album yet." Writing for The Morning Call, Diana Valois said that if Last Rights closed Skinny Puppy's career, it would be an admirable conclusion. In 1998, Alternative Press ranked Last Rights as the 58th best album of the 1990s. However, not all critics were taken with the album's assault of sound. Dave Morrison of Select called the album "a huge stir-fried noise that's genuinely astonishing at times, but generally unfocused, often collapsing under its own weight".

== Track listing ==
All tracks are written by Skinny Puppy.

No.	Title	Length
1.	"Love in Vein"	5:35
2.	"Killing Game"	3:48
3.	"Knowhere?"	4:18
4.	"Mirror Saw"	3:51
5.	"Inquisition"	5:17
6.	"Scrapyard"	3:54
7.	"Riverz End"	6:40
8.	"Lust Chance"	3:54
9.	"Circustance"	4:36
11.	"Download"	11:01
Total length:		52:54

Notes

- On many releases of Last Rights, the tenth track is included and left blank to mark the absence of the original song. See § "Left Handshake" for details.
- A 1994 CD catalog from the United Kingdom listed working titles for the album's tracks, which are as follows: "Hinder", "Killing Game", "Cancelled", "Xception", "Catbowl", "Hurtful 2", "Rivers End", "Fester", "Premonition", "Wrek", and "Epilogue 2".

== Personnel ==
All credits adapted from liner notes.

Skinny Puppy

- Nivek Ogre – vocals
- cEvin Key – synthesizers, guitars, bass guitars, drums, production
- Dwayne Goettel – synthesizers, sampling, mixing

Production personnel

- Dave Ogilvie – mixing, production
- Brian Gardner – mastering
- Ken Marshall – engineering, mixing
- Anthony Valcic – editing
- Martijn de Kleer – synthesizers (track 11)

Design personnel

- Jim Cummins – artwork
- John Rummen – layout, design
- Andy Graffiti – artwork

== Chart positions ==
Chart (1992)	Peak position
US Billboard 200	193
US Heatseekers Albums (Billboard)	10
