= Remission (EP) =

EP by Skinny Puppy
- Released: December 1984
- Recorded: July–August 1984 (Mushroom Studios, Vancouver)
- Genre: Electro-industrial; EBM; synthpop
- Length: 24:09 (original); 39:33 (re-issue)
- Label: Nettwerk (Canada); Scarface/Play It Again Sam (Europe)
- Producer: cEvin Key, Dave Ogilvie

Skinny Puppy chronology
Back & Forth (1984)	Remission (1984)	Bites (1985)

Remission is a 1984 EP by Canadian electro-industrial band Skinny Puppy, their record label debut and first release with Nettwerk. The 12-inch EP originally featured six tracks, then, a year later in 1985, it was released on cassette with five additional songs that lengthened the release to a full album. This expansion became the default version of Remission.

Remission was certified gold by Music Canada on January 31, 2000.

== Release history ==
In December 1984, Remission was distributed through Nettwerk as Skinny Puppy's first major release. Despite being preceded by the embryonic Back & Forth EP that was limited to just 35 home-printed copies, Remission is seen as the band's debut effort. To complicate the matter further, most issues of the EP following its release year, 1984, were expanded with five additional tracks, retroactively turning it into a full-blown studio album.

In 1993, Nettwerk released Remission on CD using the expanded track listing from the 1985 cassette release. However, this wasn't the first time Remission appeared in the format; the EP's first CD release was in 1987, when it (along with the appended track "Glass Out") was combined with Skinny Puppy's 1985 album Bites to form the release Bites and Remission (a compilation distinct from the less popular Remission & Bites, which was also released in 1987 and also on Nettwerk, but that preserved the original track sequence of Remission and the European sequence of Bites).

On May 17, 2018, cEvin Key released "Coma", an instrumental track created during the Remission era, through his YouTube channel.

== Background and composition ==
Both Remission and Skinny Puppy's follow-up album Bites were created before Dwayne Goettel joined in 1986 and helped crystallize the band's hard, percussion-driven industrial sound. As such, Remission features more synthpop and electro elements than Skinny Puppy would come to be known for. It is one of the first known commercial releases to use a TR-909 drum machine.

In 2013, Skinny Puppy's album Weapon was released as a sort of spiritual successor to both Remission and Bites. Apart from containing a re-recorded version of "Solvent" from Remission, Weapon was deliberately created with antiquated instruments to achieve their early 1980s-style electronic sound.

== Critical reception ==
Professional ratings
Review scores
Source	Rating
AllMusic	3/5 stars

Contemporary reception of Remission was mostly positive. The AllMusic review wrote that the EP "remains the Puppy's finest hour. The breadth of vision and amazing instrumental prowess of vocalist Nivek Ogre and sound-designer cEvin Key will likely never be transcended." Retrospectively, Remission gained more praise, being cited as an important influence to many bands. In an article about Skinny Puppy's broad influence, Alec Chillingworth of Metal Hammer wrote, "Al Jourgensen’s Ministry was laughable in ’84, whereas Puppy gave us Remission: an EP bursting with potential, exuding a dance-ready racket heavier than anything their contemporaries offered." Fact placed Remission at number 19 on their list of 20 best industrial and EBM albums of all time, calling it "excellent electro-pop".

== Track listing ==
Original EP release (side A, Back)
No.	Title	Sample(s)	Length
1.	"Smothered Hope"	Contains samples of: Shadow of a Doubt (1943) by Alfred Hitchcock	5:14
2.	"Glass Houses"	Contains samples of: Shadow of a Doubt (1943) by Alfred Hitchcock	3:24
3.	"Far Too Frail"	Contains samples of: Shadow of a Doubt (1943) by Alfred Hitchcock; Remarks by Ronald Reagan upon signing the Child Protection Act, May 21, 1984	3:41

Original EP release (side B, Forth)
No.	Title	Sample(s)	Length
1.	"Solvent"		4:37
2.	"Sleeping Beast"	Contains samples of: If You Love This Planet (1982) by Terre Nash	6:01
3.	"Brap…"	Contains samples of: Blood for Dracula (1974) by Paul Morrissey	1:12
Total length:			24:09

1985 cassette release / 1993 CD reissue
No.	Title	Sample(s)	Length
1.	"Smothered Hope"	Contains samples of: Shadow of a Doubt (1943) by Alfred Hitchcock	5:14
2.	"Glass Houses"	Contains samples of: Shadow of a Doubt (1943) by Alfred Hitchcock	3:21
3.	"Incision"	Contains samples of: The Tenant (1976) by Roman Polanski	4:41
4.	"Far Too Frail"	Contains samples of: Shadow of a Doubt (1943) by Alfred Hitchcock; Remarks by Ronald Reagan upon signing the Child Protection Act, May 21, 1984	3:43
5.	"Film"	Contains samples of: The Legend of Hell House (1973) by John Hough; The Tenant (1976) by Roman Polanski	2:51
6.	"Manwhole"	Contains samples of: The Legend of Hell House (1973) by John Hough	1:44
7.	"Ice Breaker"	Contains samples of: The Legend of Hell House (1973) by John Hough	2:46
8.	"Solvent"		4:38
9.	"Sleeping Beast"	Contains samples of: If You Love This Planet (1982) by Terre Nash	6:01
10.	"Glass Out"	Contains samples of: Shadow of a Doubt (1943) by Alfred Hitchcock	3:25
11.	"…Brap"	Contains samples of: Blood for Dracula (1974) by Paul Morrissey	1:09
Total length:			39:33

== Personnel ==
All credits adapted from Remission liner notes.

Skinny Puppy

- Nivek Ogre – vocals, keyboards, synthesizer, percussion, spooky horn
- cEvin Key – synthesizer, drums, percussion, tapes, vocals, treatments, production

Additional personnel

- Dave Ogilvie – production, engineering
- Bill Leeb (credited as Wilhelm Schroeder) – bass synth on "Incision", "Manwhole", and "Ice Breaker"
- D. Plevin – fretless bass on "Glass Houses"
- Steven R. Gilmore – cover art
- Greg Sykes – typography

== Certifications ==
Region	Certification	Certified units/sales
Canada (Music Canada)	Gold	50,000^{^}
^{^} Shipments figures based on certification alone.
