= The Process (Skinny Puppy album) =

Studio album by Skinny Puppy
- Released: February 27, 1996
- Recorded: November 1993 – May 1995
- Studios: Several: Subconscious Studios; (Vancouver, Canada); Shangri-La Studios; (Malibu, California); Soundhouse; (Seattle, Washington)
- Genres: Post-industrial; electro-industrial; industrial rock; industrial metal
- Length: 43:08
- Labels: American Recordings; Warner Records
- Producers: Dave Ogilvie; Martin Atkins; Nivek Ogre; cEvin Key; Dwayne Goettel

Skinny Puppy chronology
Last Rights (1992)	The Process (1996)	The Greater Wrong of the Right (2004)

Singles from Post Self
- 1. "Candle" Released: 1996

The Process is the eighth studio album by Canadian industrial band Skinny Puppy. Released by American Recordings on February 27, 1996, The Process was the band's final album before it reformed in 2000 and released The Greater Wrong of the Right in 2004. Skinny Puppy's keyboardist, Dwayne Goettel, died near the end of The Process' recording, and the album experienced difficult production and record-label intrusion.

== Background, recording and concept ==
Nivek Ogre, cEvin Key, and Dwayne Goettel signed a contract with American Recordings, and moved to Malibu, California to record The Process. "Jahya" was the first song recorded for the album, the only song recorded at the band's familiar Mushroom Studios. Recording sessions were punctuated by fires, floods, and the Northridge earthquake. The album's producer changed several times, from Roli Mosimann to Martin Atkins to Dave Ogilvie. According to cEvin Key, American Recordings pressured the band into adopting a commercial, industrial metal sound similar to Nine Inch Nails. The band's bickering and excessive drug use made the recording process so long and costly that American Recordings reduced Skinny Puppy's contract from three albums to one. In 1994, Key and Goettel returned to Vancouver with the master tapes; in the face of tensions between band members, however, Ogre remained in Los Angeles and left the band on June 12, 1995. American Recordings decided to drop Skinny Puppy after the release of The Process. The band's keyboardist, Dwayne Goettel, died of a heroin overdose on August 23, 1995, and the album was dedicated to him. After Goettel's death, cEvin and Dave finished mixing The Process.

It was intended as a concept album about a 1960s psychotherapy cult known as the Process Church of the Final Judgement, to which Ogre was introduced by Genesis P-Orridge. An artist collective calling itself The Process grew out of the project. "Blue Serge" was one of Key's first experiments with a modular synthesizer.

== Composition ==
"Morter"
"Morter" demonstrates the band's departure from the style of previous albums.

The album was inspired by the music of Suicide, Cabaret Voltaire, Chrome, Throbbing Gristle, Nocturnal Emissions, Portion Control, and The Legendary Pink Dots, accessible to the band primarily via tape exchange. Skinny Puppy experimented with analog and digital recording techniques, composing multi-layered music with synthesizers, drum machines, acoustic percussion, tape loops, samplers, and conventional rock-music instruments to create what they called "audio sculpture." Their extensive use of sampling from horror films and radio broadcasts would "clarify or obscure" song meanings; they applied distortion and other effects to Ogre's vocals, which were often delivered as a stream of consciousness. Lyrics referred to social and political topics, including animal rights, environmental degradation, drug addiction, suicide, war, privacy, and self-determination. Skinny Puppy's often informal, improvisational approach to musical composition is indicated by their term "brap," a verb meaning "to get together, hook up electronic instruments, get high, and record." The Process was a stylistic departure from their previous albums, featuring untreated vocals, guitar, and more accessible song structures.

== Artwork ==
Color version of the album cover

The cover art, a photograph of a building, is by Steven R. Gilmore. Gilmore created the cover in memory of Goettel and his wife, Colette. He wrote:

The single lit window is a metaphor for the people we have lost and who have gone on to a better place. The remaining darkened rooms represent the people left behind who have to come face to face with grief, survivors guilt and depression.

Although a color version of the photo was considered, Gilmore chose the sepia-tinted version for the album.

== Release ==
When it was released, The Process was considered the final Skinny Puppy album; its liner notes read "The End" after the album credits, which included thank-yous to "Electronic Music Lovers" and "Puppy People". Ogre and Key reformed the band in 2000 and released a new album, The Greater Wrong of the Right, in 2004.

=== Critical reception ===
Professional ratings
Review scores
Source	Rating
AllMusic	2/5 stars
Calgary Herald	3/5 stars
CMJ	Mixed
Detroit Free Press	2/4 stars
Kerrang!	Favorable
Los Angeles Times	3/4 stars
Melody Maker	Favorable
NME	3/10
San Francisco Examiner	3/4 stars
Select	1/5

The Process received generally-mixed reviews from critics. AllMusic writer Steve Huey criticized the album for failing to convey its concepts, but concluded: "Still, credit must be given to the band for having finished the record at all, and in its own way, the confusion of The Process speaks volumes". Nicholas Maltezos of The Record gave the album one out of four stars: "Skinny Puppy's sound was certainly original – the group's synthesizer-dominated rock could have easily served as the background music for a dream sequence in a horror or sci-fi movie. But The Process is just a nightmare of a recording". For NME, John Perry wrote that the album was "far from being the industrial, goth knees-up you'd expect" and did little to hold listener interest: "You can't help feeling it would have been better all-round if they hadn't bothered". Ben Mitchell of Select also criticized the album: "An unerring inability to distinguish arse from elbow throughout results in a flimsy 11-track approximation of a gang of mildly irritated moped riders attempting a stage invasion at a Jean-Michel Jarre concert".

James Muretich of the Calgary Herald was impressed by "Candle", and wrote that "the band at least goes out with more of a bark than a whimper". Rommie Johnson of The Tampa Tribune gave the album two stars out of four, writing that the Last Rights track "Download" would have been "the perfect ending" for the band. Although The Process presented nothing new, saying that the album "only sounds weak in light of Puppy's track record" and "the band still make Nine Inch Nails sound like sissies". Steve Byrne of the Detroit Free Press said that "Goettel and Puppy devotees deserve a better epitaph than The Process", and the album was "bogged down in [the] B-horror-movie mode that the band has explored more relevantly before".

Some reviews were more favorable. Sandy Masuo of the Los Angeles Times described the album as "full of intriguing vagaries" and filled with "driving dance grooves, both choppy and smooth", calling "Candle" a "suitably moody swan song". Malcolm X. Abram of The Atlanta Constitution praised the band's experimentation with new sounds and styles, saying that the album "may final[ly] garner this musical institution some attention outside the protective umbrella of industrial fans". Stephen Parrish of The Morning Call agreed, saying that the band "just might enjoy some post-mortem glory with The Process" and praising "Death" and "Candle". Steffan Chirazi of the San Francisco Examiner wrote, "For newcomers, the album is a fascinating and unnerving trip through psychosis. For Skinny Puppy, The Process represents uncomfortable closure and some cohesion". Daniel Lukes of Kerrang! called The Process "the most poignant, elegiac and human album of their career".

== Track listing ==
No.	Title	Length
1.	"Jahya"	3:34
2.	"Death"	3:56
3.	"Candle"	4:58
4.	"Hardset Head"	4:06
5.	"Cult"	3:03
6.	"Process"	5:02
7.	"Curcible"	3:28
8.	"Blue Serge"	5:13
9.	"Morter"	4:39
10.	"Amnesia"	4:20
11.	"Cellar Heat"	0:49
Total length:		43:08

== Personnel ==
- Skinny Puppy:
  - Nivek Ogre – vocals, guitar, synths
  - cEvin Key – drums, bass, guitar, mixing
  - Dwayne Goettel – keyboards, synths, production
- Additional musicians:
  - Philth – wave manipulation (tracks 9, 10)
  - Pepperdine – viola and cello section (track 5)
  - Lorne Bouquet – backing vocals (tracks 3, 4)
  - Troll – guitar (track 5)
  - Pat Sprawl – guitar (tracks 1, 2, 3, 4, 5, 7)
- Technical personnel:
  - Martin Atkins – production, voices (track 2)
  - Dave Ogilvie – mixing, guitar (track 5)
  - Ken "Hi-Watt" Marshall – mixing
  - Steven R. Gilmore – artwork
  - Anthony Valcic – editing, mastering
  - Gary Winger – mixing assistance

== Chart positions ==
Chart (1996)	Peak position
Canada Top Albums/CDs (RPM)	30
Swedish Albums (Sverigetopplistan)	48
US Billboard 200	102
US Heatseekers Albums (Billboard)	1
