= The Humble Brothers =

Canadian-Tanzanian electronic music duo

- Origin: British Columbia, Canada
- Genres: Industrial, pop, nu metal, hip hop, alternative rock, pop rock, electronic rock, breakbeat, trance, ambient, salsa, neo-soul, video game music
- Years active: 1999–2009
- Labels: hiwattlabs, inc.
- Past members: Ken Marshall; Traz Damji

The Humble Brothers are an electronic music duo consisting of Canadian Ken "hiwatt" Marshall and Tanzanian-born Traz Damji. They gained fame with their involvement in Electronic Arts soundtracks, starting with 2002's Freekstyle, which was followed by Need for Speed: Hot Pursuit 2, as well as Maxis' SimCity and The Sims franchises. Most of their original compositions for The Sims contain lyrics in Simlish, the fictional language used within the games' universe, and encompasses various popular music genres. In addition, they made remixes of other artists' songs as their production skills were noticed by the mainstream music industry. Their notable remixes include Linkin Park's "One Step Closer" ("1Stp Klosr") and Static-X/Mephisto Odyssey song "Crash", which was featured on the soundtrack of Batman Beyond: Return of the Joker. The Humble Brothers have also remixed the Dry Cell song "Body Crumbles". They are also responsible for producing "Terror Is Reality" for the Capcom game Dead Rising 2.

The Humble Brothers continued to produce music for video games, television and remix albums until 2009.

== Albums ==
- Speed (2009)
- Cinematix (2009)
- Gravity Well - the Soundtrack (2009)
- In Game (2006)

== Credits ==
=== Video games ===
Year	Title	Song(s)	Notes
2000	Street Sk8er 2		Credited as Remix Artists.
2002	Freekstyle		
2002	Need for Speed: Hot Pursuit 2	"Black Hole" "Brake Stand" "Sphere"	"Sphere" would later reappear in The Sims 2 as an edited version titled "DJ Funktronic".
2003	SimCity 4	"Arctica" "Area 52" "ElectriCITY" "EpiCenter" "Metropolis" "Oasis" "Terrain"	
2003	The Sims: Superstar	"Botox Forever"	
2003	The Sims Bustin' Out	"Ah Lah Tak Kina" "Botox Forever" "Downarown Ashay" "Hoh! Abba Dah No" "Ola Mana Sey"	
2004	The Sims 2	"2night" "360" "Bonito" "Chocolate" "DJ Funktronic" "Hero" "Neighborhood" "Shicka Zicka Soom" "Smoove" "Somethin' Real"	
2004	The Urbz: Sims in the City	"Complexity" "North Side"	
2005	The Sims 2	"Chameleon" "Clearblue" "Deepswell" "Static" "Upside"	
2010	Dead Rising 2	"Terror is Reality"	
