= Cleanse Fold and Manipulate =

Studio album by Skinny Puppy
- Released: June 25, 1987
- Recorded: 1987, Vancouver
- Genre: Electro-industrial
- Length: 42:13
- Label: Nettwerk
- Producer: Dave Ogilvie, cEvin Key

Skinny Puppy chronology
Mind: The Perpetual Intercourse (1986)	Cleanse Fold and Manipulate (1987)	VIVIsectVI (1988)

Singles from Cleanse Fold and Manipulate
- 1. "Addiction" Released: 1987

Cleanse Fold and Manipulate is the third studio album by Canadian electro-industrial group Skinny Puppy. The album was released in 1987 and was supported by a single, "Addiction". The album was further supported by the Head Trauma tour, which spanned across North America and Europe. Ain't it Dead Yet?, a recording of the group performing in Toronto, Ontario, Canada, was released on video in 1989 and CD in 1991.

== Music ==
Cleanse Fold and Manipulate explores a number of different topics concerning medicine, society, and politics. The song "First Aid" addresses what was the growing AIDS epidemic of the 1980s, while "Second Tooth" concerns with the struggles faced by Vietnam War veterans, namely post-traumatic stress. The song "Deep Down Trauma Hounds" was written following a string of teenage suicides in the United States. Nivek Ogre, the group's vocalist, said of the suicides:

It seemed very scary to me that all these kids had such a bleak prospect on their future. I was on the tail-end of the generation that grew up with Walt Disney and Fantasia and Bambi and all those things that were so beautiful and important to grow up with. You need those things to perpetuate [yourself] through the years when you become cynical, instead kids are just growing up into this dark world.

Other songs on the album pay homage to horror films. The song "The Mourn" is based on the Japanese extreme horror movie Flower of Flesh and Blood from the Guinea Pig film series. According to the group, the film was the closest they had ever come to seeing what they felt was a real snuff movie. Footage from the film has since been used in their live shows.

== Release ==
Cleanse Fold and Manipulate was released on June 25, 1987. Eyeball paperweights were distributed by Capitol Records to help promote the album. The record sold 80,000 copies by October 1988, with 90 percent of sales being outside Canada.

=== Critical reception ===
Professional ratings
Review scores
Source	Rating
AllMusic	3/5 stars
NME	9/10
Times Colonist	2/4 stars

Tim DiGravina of AllMusic said the album was "hard to recommend". He went on to say while it did contain one of the band's best songs, "Deep Down Trauma Hounds", much of the album was ambient and fragmentary. Still, he added, "fans of industrial music will appreciate the album's formidable beats and coarse sound samples that seem to be generated from warping the sounds of heavy machinery. Perhaps more than other any place in Skinny Puppy's discography, Ogre's vocals work like spoken-word stream-of-conscious dementia, with more emphasis on evil tones than on any relation to their music". He concluded by saying the album was primarily recommendable to die hard fans. Evelyn Erskine from the Ottawa Citizen gave the album a favorable review, saying the album was "dark and frightening", and described the flow of its songs as "cinematic". Erskine remarked that the album was weakened by the band's overreliance on gothic horror elements. Billboard magazine recommended the album, calling it "the right combination of gloom-and-doom lyrics and throbbing, metallic music".

People magazine said listening to the album was "like stepping into a nightmare being experienced by the Phantom of the Opera" and concluded that the band was "too garish for extended exposure but, in small doses, they are extremely powerful". Mike Saunders of the Sun-Sentinel thought the album was an intriguing accomplishment, but that the initial "voyeuristic thrill" received from listening wears off before the album ends. Frances Litman from the Times Colonist thought the album was tamer than the band's previous work and only recommended it to club-goers.

== Track listing ==
All music is composed by Skinny Puppy.

No.	Title	Sample(s)	Length
1.	"First Aid"		4:29
2.	"Addiction"	Contains samples of: "Mirror Image" (1960) from The Twilight Zone by John Brahm	6:01
3.	"Shadow Cast"	Contains samples of: The Texas Chainsaw Massacre 2 (1986) by Tobe Hooper	4:18
4.	"Draining Faces"	Contains samples of: Videodrome (1983) by David Cronenberg; Year of the Dragon (1985) by Michael Cimino	5:12
5.	"The Mourn"	Contains samples of: From Beyond (1986) by Stuart Gordon	2:41
6.	"Second Tooth"	Contains samples of: Legend (1985) by Ridley Scott	4:06
7.	"Tear or Beat"	Contains samples of: Maniac (1980) by William Lustig	4:42
8.	"Deep Down Trauma Hounds"	Contains samples of: Perry Mason (1957–1966) by Gail Patrick; Water, Water Every Hare (1952) by Charles M. Jones; KSTW-11 television station	4:41
9.	"Anger"		4:53
10.	"Epilogue"		1:10
Total length:			42:13

== Additional notes ==
- To promote the album, Capitol Records (who were responsible for the release of Skinny Puppy music outside of Canada) distributed eyeball paperweights.
- Cleanse Fold and Manipulate is a cyclical album: the end of track 10, "Epilogue", segues into the beginning of track 1, "First Aid."
- In response to the cover's source image by Gilmore: "It is an image from the original 1960s movie of Village Of The Damned. There is a little tongue-in-cheek history behind using that image as the manager for Images In Vogue, a band that C. Key used to be in before Skinny Puppy, was a former child model from England and had a role in the movie. But the face on the cover was another child actor from the movie."
- "Draining Faces" was featured on The Blair Witch Project soundtrack.

== Personnel ==
All information from AllMusic.

=== Musicians ===
- Nivek Ogre – voices, lyrics, dramas, punishments and objects
- cEvin Key – synthesizers, guitars, drums, tapes, acoustic and metallic "repercussions," sequencers, radio and sampling
- Dwayne Goettel – synthesizers, sequencers and sampling
- Rave – guitar
- Mowse - backing voices

=== Production ===
- Producers – cEvin Key, Dave Ogilvie
- Engineers – cEvin Key, Dave Ogilvie
- Mastering – Pete Norman
- Cover artwork – Steven R. Gilmore

== Charts ==
Chart performance for Cleanse Fold and Manipulate
Chart (2024)	Peak position
Swedish Albums (Sverigetopplistan)	55
