= Bites (album) =

Studio album by Skinny Puppy
- Released: August 1985
- Recorded: 1984–1985 (Mushroom Studios, Vancouver)
- Genres: Industrial; electro-industrial
- Length: 40:24 (original); 72:55 (reissue)
- Labels: Nettwerk (Canada, U.S.); Play It Again Sam (Europe)
- Producers: cEvin Key, Dave Ogilvie

Skinny Puppy chronology
Remission (1984)	Bites (1985)	Mind: The Perpetual Intercourse (1986)

Bites is the first full-length studio album, and second major release overall, by Canadian industrial band Skinny Puppy, released as an LP through Nettwerk in 1985. It was reissued in 1993 on CD with additional material compiled from cassette releases, international releases, and previously undistributed tracks. The cover art was designed by Steven R. Gilmore.

Bites was certified gold by Music Canada on August 5, 1994.

== Background ==
In 1984, Skinny Puppy released Remission as their debut mini-album. A few months into 1985, however, Remission was reissued with additional tracks tacked on, thus turning it into a full-length effort. Bites was recorded around the same time, and it was originally released in August 1985. Bites was the band's final album to be released while Bill Leeb was a member of the band, as he left during the recording sessions of the band's follow-up album Mind: The Perpetual Intercourse (although Leeb appeared on one Mind: The Perpetual Intercourse track, he had departed from the band in order to start Front Line Assembly by that point).

The first CD release of Bites was on the compilation Bites and Remission in 1987. This release replaced the songs "Assimilate" and "The Choke" with remixed versions and it did not include all of the tracks featured on the earlier cassette release, which was significantly longer. A similar but distinct CD called Remission & Bites was released by Play It Again Sam in Europe during the same year. On the 1993 reissue, the song "One Day" is not listed anywhere in the artwork or credits.

The Tear Garden's self-titled EP from 1986 (one year after Bites originally saw release) includes a revised version of "The Centre Bullet" featuring vocals by Edward Ka-Spel, slightly retitled to "The Center Bullet." The two songs are identical save for the presence of vocals by The Legendary Pink Dots singer. Late reissues of the Tear Garden album Tired Eyes Slowly Burning also feature that version of "The Center Bullet". Having both been made by cEvin Key and Dave Ogilvie, it is unclear whether the track was originally a creation of Skinny Puppy or of The Tear Garden.

In December 2014, Leeb reunited with Skinny Puppy during the band's stop at Vancouver. It was his first time performing with Skinny Puppy in nearly three decades (his band, Front Line Assembly, had also performed at the same event). For the encore, they performed the Bites track "Assimilate".

== Critical reception ==
Professional ratings
Review scores
Source	Rating
AllMusic	3/5 stars

Billboard magazine recommended Bites, calling it a "strong club collection a la Kraftwerk". Tom Harrison of The Province gave the album a favorable review, calling it "willfully ugly and menacing", and described its songs as "cleanly produced" and "carefully textured". Tim DiGravina of AllMusic was also receptive, calling the album a "fascinating look at Skinny Puppy in embryonic form", and described its sound as "delicate and pristine". DiGravina also noted the influence of groups such as Depeche Mode, the Human League, and Cabaret Voltaire.

Mike Abrams of the Ottawa Citizen thought Bites was depressing and for people with "undiscriminating tastes". He named the songs "Assimilate" and "Last Call" as the album's best tracks. James Muretich of the Calgary Herald was less impressed with Bites, calling the record "annoying" and likened the band to robots.

In 1999, Chart magazine listed Bites among the most influential Canadian albums of the 1980s.

In 2023 the album was the recipient of the Heritage Public Prize at the 2023 Polaris Music Prize.

== Track listing ==
Original 1985 LP release
No.	Title	Length
1.	"Assimilate"	6:56
2.	"Dead Lines"	6:13
3.	"Blood on the Wall"	2:58
4.	"Icebreaker"	3:14
5.	"The Choke"	6:29
6.	"Social Deception"	2:57
7.	"Basement"	3:29
8.	"Last Call"	5:54
9.	"Film"	2:18
Total length:		40:24

1993 CD reissue (tracks 1–9 are labeled as Attack, and 10–16 as Decay)
No.	Title	Length
1.	"Assimilate"	6:56
2.	"Blood on the Wall"	2:58
3.	"Dead Lines"	6:13
4.	"Church"	3:16
5.	"Icebreaker"	3:14
6.	"Tomorrow"	4:53
7.	"Dead Doll"	2:28
8.	"Film"	2:18
9.	"Love"	1:51
10.	"The Choke"	6:29
11.	"Social Deception"	2:57
12.	"Christianity"	1:32
13.	"Basement"	3:25
14.	"Last Call"	5:54
15.	"Falling"	4:20
16.	"The Centre Bullet"	9:42
17.	"One Day" (Hidden track)	4:20
Total length:		72:55

1985 Belgian LP release
No.	Title	Length
1.	"Assimilate"	6:56
2.	"The Choke"	6:29
3.	"Blood on the Wall"	2:58
4.	"Church"	3:16
5.	"Dead Lines" (Misprinted as 'Deadlines')	6:13
6.	"Last Call"	5:54
7.	"Basement"	3:25
8.	"Tomorrow"	4:53
Total length:		40:04

1985 cassette release (side 1)
No.	Title	Length
1.	"Assimilate"	6:56
2.	"Blood on the Wall"	2:58
3.	"Dead Lines"	6:13
4.	"Icebreaker"	3:14
5.	"Film"	2:18
6.	"Church"	3:16
Total length:		24:55

1985 cassette release (side 2)
No.	Title	Length
1.	"The Choke" (Misprinted as 'Choke')	6:29
2.	"Christianity"	1:32
3.	"Social Deception"	2:57
4.	"Basement"	3:25
5.	"Last Call"	5:54
6.	"Tomorrow"	4:53
7.	"Love"	1:51
Total length:		27:01

Samples

- The song "Assimilate" contains a sample from the 1976 film Marathon Man – "Is it safe?".
- The song "Blood on the Wall" contains a sample from The Texas Chainsaw Massacre (1974) – "You see? They say it's just an old man talking. You laugh at an old man. There's them that laughs and knows better." It also contains samples from The Tenant (1976).
- The song "The Choke" contains samples from the 1976 film The Tenant – "If you cut off my head, what would I say? Me and my... Me and my head, or me and my body?".
- The songs "Church", "Icebreaker", "Love" and "Basement" contain samples from the 1973 film The Legend of Hell House (1973) – "Get out before I kill you all!"

== Personnel ==
Credits from AllMusic.

Skinny Puppy

- Nivek Ogre – vocals, guitars, synthesizers, metallic percussion, treatments and objects
- cEvin Key – bass guitars, guitars, synthesizers, sequencers, tapes, sampler, treatments, acoustic and metallic percussion, drums

Additional musicians and artwork

- Bill Leeb (as Wilhelm Schroeder) – bass synth on "Icebreaker" and "The Choke"
- D. Pleven – bass guitar destruction on "Blood on the Wall"
- Steven R. Gilmore – artwork
- Greg Sykes – artwork assistance

Technical personnel

- Dave Ogilvie – production, engineering
- Tom Ellard – production, mixing, tapes, treatments, and digital sampling on "Assimilate"
- Terry McBride – executive production

== Certifications ==
Region	Certification	Certified units/sales
Canada (Music Canada)	Gold	50,000^{^}
^{^} Shipments figures based on certification alone.
