= Steven R. Gilmore =

Canadian artist and graphic designer

Steven R. Gilmore is a Canadian artist and graphic designer most known for his work on album cover design, particularly his role as in-house artist for Nettwerk Records for much of the 1980s and 1990s. He has designed record album sleeves for bands such as Skinny Puppy, Nickelback, A Perfect Circle, BT, Machines of Loving Grace, Static-X, and Two Steps from Hell.

== Career ==
Although Gilmore began working as an artist during the 1970s, his career did not take off until the 1980s, when he began actively working with various Canadian bands. Gilmore met Kevin Crompton (aka CEvin Key) of Skinny Puppy at a nightclub in 1982, and the two became friends with Gilmore subsequently designing artwork for a number of Key's projects. Crompton approached Gilmore to design the sleeve for the first Skinny Puppy release on Nettwerk Records which led to an ongoing relationship with the label. In the course of designing for Skinny Puppy, Gilmore developed several custom typefaces for the task.

According to the sprawling history of Canadian popular music Have Not Been the Same, "Steven R. Gilmore was enlisted as the resident artist to design a distinct look for the label’s promotional material and album covers. Shaping the look of the label would remain crucial throughout Nettwerk’s history…"

Gilmore also created the soundtrack artwork and related promotional materials for films such as The Dark Knight, 300, Watchmen and The Lord of the Rings.

As both a DJ and artist, Gilmore helped shape the aesthetics of industrial music, according to scholar S. Alexander Reed's book Assimilate: A Critical History of Industrial Music.
