= List of Skinny Puppy side projects =

This is a list of side projects of the industrial band Skinny Puppy, who have released twelve albums and toured extensively since 1982. This list includes other projects begun by cEvin Key and Nivek Ogre—the only constant members of Skinny Puppy—since its inception. Other members have included Dwayne Goettel, Mark Walk, Dave "Rave" Ogilvie, and many other guests/session musicians; this list does not include other projects of those musicians.

== Side projects ==
- A Chud Convention: A one-off project of Key, Goettel, and Ogre with JΔ3 SEUQCAJ and SΔ3 EVETS of à;GRUMH....
  - Sorrow (1987)
- aDuck: Goettel's solo project. "Power" was the first release on Subconscious Communications.
  - Power (1993)
- cEvin Key solo:
  - Music for Cats (1998)
  - The Ghost of Each Room (2001)
  - The Dragon Experience (2003) (with Ken "Hiwatt" Marshall)
- Cyberaktif: A one-off project of Key and Goettel with Bill Leeb, with a guest appearance from Blixa Bargeld.
  - Temper (1990)
  - Nothing Stays (1991)
  - Tenebrae Vision (1991)
- Doubting Thomas: Key & Goettel's outlet for non-Skinny Puppy instrumentals.
  - Father Don't Cry (1991)
  - The Infidel (1991)
  - The Infidel: Special Edition 20 Year Anniversary (2007)
- Download: Formed by Key, Goettel, Mark Spybey and Phil Western in 1994.
  - Furnace (1995)
  - Microscopic (1996)
  - Charlie's Family (1996)
  - Sidewinder (1996)
  - The Eyes of Stanley Pain (1996)
  - III (1997)
  - Effector (2000)
  - Inception (2002)
  - III Steps Forward (2002)
  - Fixer (2007)
  - HElicopTEr (2009)
- Hell 'O' Death Day: The name Key and Ogre used when they opened for Chris & Cosey on their 1985 Canadian tour. Some of this material later appeared on editions of Skinny Puppy's Remission and Bites.
- Hilt: Begun in the mid-1980s by Key and Alan Nelson as The Flu, who self-released some of their early material on cassette. Listed below are Hilt's releases.
  - Get Stuck (1989)
  - Call the Ambulance (Before I Hurt Myself) (1990)
  - Stoneman (1990)
  - Journey to the Centre of the Bowl (1991)
  - Orange Pony (1991)
  - The Worst of The Flu 1985-1996 (2003)
  - Minoot Bowl Dropped the Ball (2007)
- Involution: A one-off project of Key with Paris Sedonis and Bree.
  - Involution (1998)
- Lee Chubby King: A one-off project of Key and Goettel with Alan Nelson and Lee Salford.
  - Yo' Pusface
- Mutual Mortuary: A one-off project of Ogre and Bill Leeb. "Shadow Gods" and "Hateless Insanity" were released on Belgian cassette compilations, without Ogre's consent.
- Ogre and Rave: Ogre and Dave "Rave" Ogilvie had several small side projects. "Aftermath" never released anything, while "Raw Dog" included contributions from Dave's wife Rosie. . The track "Ode to Groovy", while credited to Skinny Puppy on an animal rights benefit compilation, was actually just Ogre and Rave.
- ohGr: Ogre's project with Mark Walk, originally known as "W.E.L.T.". Their first album was originally recorded in 1995, but was held up in legal issues with the label. An early incarnation of W.E.L.T. included Ogre and Al Jourgensen, whose unreleased track "Noreen" evolved into Ministry's "The Fall". Ogre and Mark Walk have also recorded as "Ogre & Mark Walk".
  - Welt (2001)
  - SunnyPsyOp (2003)
  - Devils in my Details (2008)
  - Undeveloped (2011)
  - TrickS (2018)
- The Petty Tyrants: A one-off project of Ogre with Mark Walk and Bill Rieflin. Contributed a cover of Wire's "Our Swimmer" to the Wire tribute album Whore in 1996.
- platEAU: Key and Phil Western's ambient techno/chillout project.
  - Music For Grass Bars (1997)
  - Dutch Flowers (1997)
  - Spacecake (1999)
  - Iceolator (2002)
  - Kushbush + Music For Grass Bars Special Edition (2007)
- PTP: Ogre contributed vocals to the song "Show Me Your Spine" by this Ministry side project, which was used in the 1987 film RoboCop, but was not commercially released until 2004 on Ministry's Side Trax compilation.
- Raw Dog: a collaboration between Ogre and David "Rave" Ogilvie. Contributed the track "Raw Dog" to the 1993 compilation Rivet Head Culture on the record label If It Moves.
- Rx: Ogre's one-off project with Martin Atkins. Also known as "Ritalin".
  - Bedside Toxicology (1998)
- Scaremeister: Key's film scoring project. Key contributed to several pieces on John Debney's score for End of Days (1999).
- The Tear Garden: Formed by Key and Edward Ka-Spel in 1985.
  - The Tear Garden (1986)
  - Tired Eyes Slowly Burning (1987)
  - The Last Man To Fly (1992)
  - Sheila Liked The Rodeo (1993)
  - Bouquet of Black Orchids (compilation) (1993)
  - To Be An Angel Blind, The Crippled Soul Divide (1996)
  - Crystal Mass (2000)
  - For Those Who Would Walk With The Gods (compilation) (2001)
  - Eye Spy With My Little Eye (2002)
  - The Secret Experiment (2007)
  - Have a Nice Trip (2009)
- ZZZ Bot: Key with Jacob Cino of Third Eye Tribe.

== Guest appearances ==
Notable guest appearances of Skinny Puppy members with other bands include:

- Ogre with KMFDM: Ogre performed vocals on "Torture" from KMFDM's Symbols, and joined the band for its 1997 tour. He also performed vocals on "That's All" and "Full Worm Garden" on KMFDM's Adios (1999).
- Ogre with Ministry: Ogre toured with Ministry in the late 1980s and co-wrote "Thieves" and "Breathe" on Ministry's The Mind is a Terrible Thing to Taste (1989). Ministry would often perform a live cover of Skinny Puppy's "Smothered Hope" during this period.
- Ogre with Pigface: Ogre toured extensively with the industrial rock supergroup Pigface in the early 1990s, and appeared on a number of their recordings and videos, including a cover of Skinny Puppy's "T.F.W.O.".
- Ogre with Revolting Cocks: Ogre appeared on several early Revolting Cocks tracks and videos.
- Key guested with a number of bands, including the Legendary Pink Dots, Collide, and Dead Voices On Air.
- Key and Goettel are listed as "additional personnel" on Decree's 1996 album Wake of Devastation, a variation of that album's "Talons Grasp" appeared as the Skinny Puppy track "Those Loud Neighbours" on Back and Forth Series 7.
- Goettel played keyboards on "Night Returning" on Sister Machine Gun's debut album Sins of the Flesh (1992).
- Remixes: Various members of Skinny Puppy have remixed a number of other artists, including Haujobb, Psychic TV, Metallica, and Mötley Crüe.
- Skinny Puppy had a brief cameo in the 1995 film The Doom Generation.
