= Paradigm Shift (album) =

Compilation album by various artists
- Released: February 25, 1997
- Recorded: 1988–1996
- Genre: Industrial, experimental, IDM
- Length: 56:37
- Label: Nettwerk/Subconscious Communications

Paradigm Shift is an album by various artists and recorded under the Nettwerk and Subconscious Communications record labels. It is Subconscious Communications' tenth release. The album also contains unreleased tracks that artist Dwayne Goettel never lived to see produced.

== Track listing ==
Tracks are listed in numerical order, title, running time and artist.

1. "Power" – 8:00 (aDuck)
2. "Touched" – 4:40 (Philth)
3. "Zonk Lift" – 4:40 (Download)
4. "Grasshopper" – 4:47 (PlatEAU)
5. "ZXY World" – 4:54 (Doubting Thomas)
6. "Georgie the Parasite" – 3:56 (The Tear Garden)
7. "Glae Bastards" – 4:36 (Dead Voices on Air)
8. "Beflepia" – 4:16 (Kone)
9. "Blowfish (Remix)" – 4:53 (Doubting Thomas)
10. "Burnout" – 5:31 (aDuck)
11. "Melt" – 4:17 (Skinny Puppy)
12. "Message 3" – 2:07 (The Tear Garden)

== See also ==
- Wild Planet, another Subconscious compilation.
