= Wild Planet (compilation album) =

Compilation album by Various artists
- Released: May 9, 2000
- Recorded: 1989–1999
- Genre: Industrial, experimental, IDM
- Length: 73:23
- Label: Nettwerk/Subconscious Communications

Professional ratings
Review scores
Source	Rating
Allmusic	4/5 stars

Wild Planet is a compilation album released under the Nettwerk and Subconscious Communications record labels. The various artists throughout serve as some relation to cEvin Key, of Skinny Puppy, and were also compiled on the album by Key himself. A majority of the tracks are exclusive to this release, and have not been released before or since then.

== Track listing ==
Tracks are listed in numerical order, title, running time and artist.

1. "Toooly Hooof (Remix)" – 5:04 (Download)
2. "Quackerz (Revision)" – 3:59 (aDuck)
3. "Three Years" – 5:48 (PlatEAU)
4. "Steps" – 4:10 (Doubting Thomas)
5. "Rodent (Remix)" – 5:51 (Skinny Puppy)
6. "Things That Go Bump In the Night" – 5:45 (The Tear Garden)
7. "Ultra Binghi (Brain Melter Mix)" – 4:23 (Twilight Circus)
8. "Sanity Shovel" – 6:08 (Philth)
9. "Foundflap" – 3:27 (Floatpoint)
10. "I Still Ate Her" – 5:05 (cEvin Key)
11. "Infinite Domain (Version)" – 6:03 (Lustmord)
12. "Decaying Orbit" – 5:26 (Off & Gone)
13. "Fate's Faithful Punchline (Version)" – 5:39 (The Legendary Pink Dots)
14. "Rijn" – 6:35 (Dead Voices On Air & Dropstar)

== See also ==
- Paradigm Shift
