= Too Dark Park =

Studio album by Skinny Puppy
- Released: October 30, 1990
- Recorded: 1990
- Studios: Mushroom Studios (Vancouver, British Columbia, Canada); Little Mountain Sound Studios (Vancouver, British Columbia, Canada)
- Genres: Industrial dance; electro-industrial; industrial metal
- Length: 38:32
- Label: Nettwerk
- Producers: Dave Ogilvie, cEvin Key

Skinny Puppy chronology
Rabies (1989)	Too Dark Park (1990)	Last Rights (1992)

Singles from Too Dark Park
- 1. "Tormentor" Released: 1990; 2. "Spasmolytic" Released: 1991

Vinyl cover

Too Dark Park is the sixth studio album by the industrial music group Skinny Puppy. The album cover features the debut appearance of the band's "SP" logo. The cover art was created by Vancouver based artist Jim Cummins. The artwork for this album and its associated singles was inspired by cosmic horror stories such as the Cthulhu Mythos. Lyrical themes include collapse of society due to destruction of nature, drug addiction, and psychological issues.

The album was recorded "spontaneously" at Mushroom Studios and mixed at Little Mountain Sound Studios in Vancouver, British Columbia. Though guitar is used throughout, the album takes a step back from the Ministry-inspired direction of the band's previous release, favoring instead a more chaotic, electronic sound. Two of the album's songs, "Tormentor" and "Spasmolytic", were released as singles, the latter of which was accompanied by a music video. Guest performers on the album include Canadian music producer Greg Reely and Skinny Puppy's longtime producer Dave "Rave" Ogilvie playing guitar on the songs "Nature's Revenge" and "T.F.W.O.".

Since its release, Too Dark Park has received generally positive reviews from critics. The album has been commended for its haunting electronic riffs and use of sampling, though some have noted that the music's disturbing nature could be off-putting to some listeners. The group promoted the album with the Too Dark Park tour, which encompassed much of the United States and Canada. Though a live album has never been released, some live recordings from the tour have been featured on other Skinny Puppy releases, namely Brap: Back and Forth Series 3 & 4 and the "Spasmolytic" single.

== Background ==
Following its production, the members of the band maintained that they were satisfied with their fifth full-length studio effort, 1989's Rabies. In 1990, keyboardist Dwayne Goettel stated the following regarding the band's attitude towards the album: "we all like it, and I can see the worry in people's eyes, but it doesn't worry us. We did it, and we like it, and I'm not worried about doing another just like it, you know?" He proclaimed Rabies to be his favorite out of all other Skinny Puppy albums and went on to say that he would not mind "doing another just like it". Goettel told Karen Woods of Alternative Press that he didn't feel "trapped" by the direction taken on Rabies and went on to say that "it [the album] may have been hanging around in the same territory as Ministry, but we were just crossing paths".

These kinds of sentiments would, however, not last for long. Goettel revealed in 1991 that he had changed his position concerning Rabies, stating that while some of the material present on the album was "great", the completed product was "less within the Skinny Puppy vision". Goettel even went on to criticize the album's cover art and made mention of how the group had begun to receive fan mail inquiring as to whether Skinny Puppy was becoming a "hardcore" group. cEvin Key (drums/keyboards) claimed that he had been dubious about the album's production from the start. Key claimed that he had been "pissed off" with regards to singer/songwriter Nivek Ogre's apparent partiality for Ministry over Skinny Puppy, but stated that he acknowledged why Ogre had made this choice (it being a change of pace for Ogre).

Of all the troubles with Rabies, Key was most displeased with Al Jourgensen's role in the recording process, claiming that he believed Jourgensen's intention during production was to try and break up the band. Ogre himself was unhappy with Rabies, declaring that he felt he had "flopped" during its production. Ogre went on to proclaim the following concerning his experience: "I was really unsure of myself and unsure of what I wanted to say and do. The work and artistic environment really weren't there at all either. It was completely negative".

Following the completion of Rabies, the three band members began to explore various side projects. Ogre went on tour with Ministry, having been credited as a songwriter on two songs from The Mind Is a Terrible Thing to Taste and having introduced Jourgensen to Angela Lukacin, who was sampled on "Dream Song". On the tour, he was playing keyboard and providing vocals (Ogre can be seen and heard on the In Case You Didn't Feel Like Showing Up video and CD). Ogre also provided vocals for the Revolting Cocks (a Ministry side project) album Beers, Steers, and Queers. Key and Goettel pursued a number of different projects during this time. The first of which was Hilt, a collaboration with Don Harrison of the Sons of Freedom and vocalist Al Nelson. Dave "Rave" Ogilvie was also a part of the project. Doubting Thomas was the second Key and Goettel project, featuring primarily instrumental compositions. The third and final project was titled Cyberaktif. Cyberaktif was a collaboration between Key and Bill Leeb from the band Front Line Assembly, with Goettel acting predominantly as a support musician. The focus on these projects led to speculation that Skinny Puppy had disbanded. Steven Gilmore, Skinny Puppy's long time art director, had claimed during an interview with Key and Ogre that Sire Records had relayed to MTV that the group was no more; Ogre asserted that "it's a lot of talk and talk can only be justified when it's actually seen". The energy and enthusiasm generated from this diverse array of side projects would ultimately culminate into what would become the Too Dark Park record, which Key described as "the follow up to the last pure Puppy album", VIVIsectVI.

== Production and music ==
Nivek Ogre had been invited to join the Revolting Cocks on tour in 1990, having previously provided vocals on their 1988 tour. Ogre declined the offer, explaining his reason why to Alternative Press in 1991:

Al is a fucking great guy, a real cool person. There are things that I admire about him... a lot. But there were a few things that happened between me and him that really made me question our whole friendship and his reason for having me down there. So I decided to bow out of the Revolting Cocks tour. If I hadn't, I would have come back totally addicted to heroin. There were rumors that I was fired, that I was a junkie - I wasn't quite at that point yet, but I was on that sort of final destination.

With Ogre no longer committed to the Revolting Cocks tour and all side projects taken on by Key and Goettel completed, Skinny Puppy reassembled in studio to begin production on a new album. Goettel stated that the intention in making Too Dark Park was, in a way, an effort to reassess "everything" about Skinny Puppy. Key indicated that by fixing the mistakes that had been made on the previous record, there would then be the opportunity to return to the band's original aspirations. The group aimed for their first album of the 1990s to have a new sound and achieved this by taking what had worked well for them in the previous decade and incorporated it with fresh ideas. This also meant hiring a new art director, Jim Cummins, as Goettel had explained that the band's album artwork had been "stagnating".

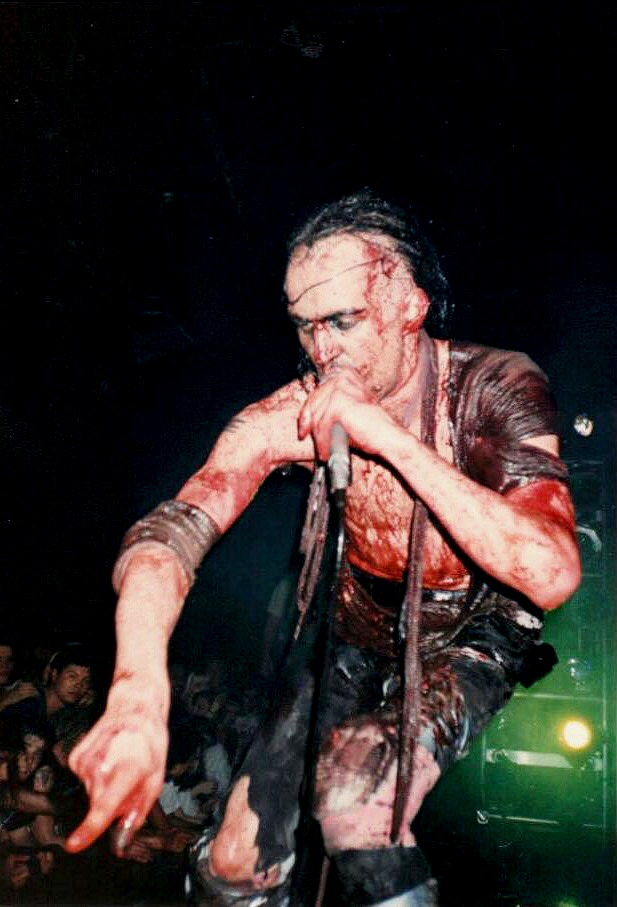
Nivek Ogre performing on the Too Dark Park tour

On the origins of the album's title, Key has stated that it was meant to be a rhyme on words. He mentions that during the writing process, the band took notice to the fact that the material they were coming up with was becoming "really dark" and thus crafted the title Too Dark Park. The album explores a number of concepts, especially those pertaining to environmental degradation and the self-destruction of humanity. Ogre described the basis for the album's underlying message as the following: "that feeling of going down a road with the knowledge that you're breaking down. Yet you continue to travel down that road." The album also explores more personal territory, particularly Ogre's dealings with heroin. Ogre revealed to Alternative Press how he had nearly been arrested for possession while working in Chicago and how that incident had nearly brought his career to an end.

As is typical for the band, the music contains an array of samples from horror films, television shows, and documentaries. The song "Convulsion" contains samples from the 1967 documentary LSD-25 as well as from the Japanese erotic horror anime Legend of the Overfiend (the sound effects heard at the beginning of the song). "Tormentor" contains a line from the Bob Clark's 1987 film From the Hip. "Natures Revenge" samples the 1989 film Communion while "Shore Lined Poison" samples the 1967 film The Trip. The song "Morpheus Laughing" contains a sample of actor Bruce Willis saying the line "they appeared to me as if in a dream" from a Wayne's World skit on Saturday Night Live. The song "T.F.W.O." features the line "you have to fuck life" from the 1973 horror film Flesh for Frankenstein and "Reclamation" contains samples from the 1988 horror film Hellbound: Hellraiser II and the 1978 animated adaptation of Watership Down.

The album was produced by cEvin Key and Dave Ogilvie, and recorded at Mushroom Studios with the additional aid of Ken Marshall. The album was mixed at Little Mountain Sound Studios by Ken Marshall, Dave Ogilvie, and Greg Reely.

== Release ==
Too Dark Park was released worldwide on October 30, 1990. For its initial release, the CD featured a full color fold out booklet on which the liner notes were printed. Later pressings featured a stapled booklet with only the front cover being colored in. The 1998 and 2004 reissue once again contain the full color fold out booklet, with somewhat reworked artwork and disc design. The initial pressing released in the UK had the same catalogue number as pressings released in the US; "printed in the U.S.A." was digitally edited to read "printed in the U.K.". In the US, Capitol Records promoted the album's release by distributing cardboard masks based on the monsters featured in Jim Cummins' cover artwork.

The song "Tormentor" was released as a single and featured an alternative version of the song "Nature's Revenge" as well as the B-side "Bark". "Spasmolytic" was released as a single in 1991; a music video was produced for commercial airplay. A VHS version of the video was distributed for use in dance clubs and video shows.

== Critical reception ==
Professional ratings
Review scores
Source	Rating
AllMusic	4.5/5 stars
Calgary Herald	E
Chicago Tribune	2/4 stars
Q	3/5 stars
Tampa Bay Times	5/5 stars
The Tampa Tribune	3/4 stars

Too Dark Park was well received upon its release in 1990, with critics like Spin magazine's Staci Bonner declaring the record to be the band's "return to the bloodbath". Bonner gave the most praise to the album's sampling, calling the technique's use "artful", and concluded that "you can be a 'spun web deluded of life' or a 'crushed velvet corpse' because with Skinny Puppy, everyday is Halloween." Jean Carey of the Tampa Bay Times praised the album, describing it as the band's "watershed moment", and calling attention to the "vaguely central theme" of environmental destruction. Steven Perez of the Tampa Tribune also took note of the album's "environmental kick", saying Too Dark Park's "impressiveness lies beyond the mirage of its droning industrial instrumentation". Sandra A. Garcia of B-Side magazine also spoke highly of the record, calling it "superb" and a "step regained" following Rabies. Garcia described the album as "dark and dense", and declared that the band was once again in full control of their music.

Alex Henderson of AllMusic gave the album four and a half stars, describing it a "forceful and consistently abrasive", but at the same time danceable. Henderson approved of the album's "twisted" sampling, distorted synth work, and use of guitar, and concluded that while the album was a must have for fans of industrial music, newcomers may be put off by its chaotic sound and would find it best to start off with the genre's more accessible offerings. Daniel Lukes of Kerrang! described the album as "controlled chaos at its most unsettling" and that it reflected Skinny Puppy at the height of their creativity. Trouser Press magazine described Too Dark Park as "environmentally minded" and likened the gloomy musical style employed on the songs "Nature's Revenge" and "Morpheus Laughing" to those of new wave acts such as Joy Division and Gary Numan. Martin Aston in Q Magazine noted that the album "quakes with the usual quotient of fury and frustration (...) matched only by the relentlessly crushing beats of their electronic hardcore throb".

In a mixed review for The Morning Call, Diana Valois said the album was "harsher in parts" than the band's previous releases, and approved of the songs "Nature's Revenge" and "Rash Reflection" for "rising above the muddled, angry morass". Billboard also gave the album a mixed review, stating that while fans of alternative music would enjoy it, there was not much to offer that couldn't be found in other, more accessible groups such as Ministry.

Not all critics were as receptive to Too Dark Park. In a negative review for the Calgary Herald, Mark Tremblay likened the band to an "environmental punk version of Hawkwind". Mitchell May of the Chicago Tribune awarded the album two out of four stars, saying that "not only do they apparently care very little about actually selling records, but they openly defy the listener to like them." Gigen Mammoser of Vice noted that Too Dark Park was "the rejection of a genre headed increasingly towards mainstream acceptance." Mammoser described the album as "frightening" and likened it to a mental disorder. Though he had mixed feelings towards the album, Mammoser admitted to "dusting it off" for a listen on certain occasions.

In 2013, Francois Marchand of the Vancouver Sun named Too Dark Park one of the best albums to come out of Mushroom Studios, describing it as a "nightmarish vortex of hard-hitting electronic rock". Metal Hammer placed Too Dark Park on their list of the best 10 industrial metal albums as well as the 10 best industrial music albums, describing its "dance-floor beats" and "raw screaming noise" as the antithesis of the techno scene.

== Track listing ==
All tracks are written by Ogre/Key/Goettel.

No.	Title	Sample(s)	Length
1.	"Convulsion"	Contains samples of: LSD-25 (1967) by David Parker; Legend of the Overfiend (1989) by Hideki Takayama	3:20
2.	"Tormentor"	Contains samples of: From the Hip (1987) by Bob Clark	4:33
3.	"Spasmolytic"		3:53
4.	"Rash Reflection"		3:28
5.	"Nature's Revenge"	Contains samples of: Communion (1989) by Philippe Mora	3:57
6.	"Shore Lined Poison"	Contains samples of: The Trip (1967) by Roger Corman	4:49
7.	"Grave Wisdom"		3:45
8.	"T.F.W.O."	Contains samples of: Flesh for Frankenstein (1973) by Paul Morrissey	3:47
9.	"Morpheus Laughing"	Contains samples of: "Saturday Night Live 15th Anniversary Special" from Saturday Night Live (1989)	4:00
10.	"Reclamation"	Contains samples of: Watership Down (1978) by Martin Rosen; Hellbound: Hellraiser II (1988) by Tony Randel	3:00
Total length:			38:32

== Personnel ==
All information from Too Dark Park's liner notes.

=== Musicians ===
- Nivek Ogre – vocals
- cEvin Key – drums, synthesizers, guitars, sampling
- Dwayne Goettel – synthesizers, guitars, bass

=== Additional personnel ===
- Dave Ogilvie – guitar (tracks 5 and 8), production, recording, mixing (tracks 1, 3, and 5–9)
- Dale Plevin – fretless bass (tracks 1 and 5), stick bass (track 10)
- Greg Reely – piano (track 4), mixing (tracks 2, 4, and 10)
- cEvin Key – production
- Ken Marshall – recording, mixing
- Jim Cummins – sleeve design
