= Puppy Gristle =

EP by Skinny Puppy
- Released: February 2002
- Recorded: November 1993 in Malibu, CA (Shangri-La Studios)
- Genre: Industrial
- Length: 40:11
- Label: Subconscious Communications
- Producer: cEvin Key

Skinny Puppy chronology
The Process (1996)	Puppy Gristle (2002)	Back and Forth Series 6 (2003)

Puppy Gristle is an album released as a part of cEvin Key's subscription-service "From the Vault" in 2002, under the Skinny Puppy name. This was planned to be a limited-edition, subscription-only release of 1,000 copies available exclusively through the label's mailorder. It was eventually re-issued in larger quantities as a digipak in 2002/2003.

== Notes ==
This release was recorded as a live improvised jam session one afternoon, at 30065 Morning View Drive in Malibu, California.

This performance was mixed by Ken Marshall in 1993, though it was reassembled and remixed in 2002 by cEvin Key.

Sections of this composition were previously heard on the Psychic TV compilations Electric Newspaper. Issue.Two and Electric Newspaper. Issue.Three, as well as on Download's Charlie's Family and The Eyes of Stanley Pain.

The release features liner notes by Key and P-Orridge, though none by Ogre or Thrasher. In 2006, Thrasher recalled the sessions on the Internet with this statement (verbatim):

Puppy Gristle was an amazing spontaneous explosion of energy with cascading and expanding reams of sound fissures driven by some invisible light. We were all very pleased to be witness. Im just reminded how I went over to Dwayne's sampling keyboard while I was wandering around the studio of Shangri-la [Studios]. Everything was turned on. I started striking some keys. And it was like Wagner, Stockhausen, and King Tubby had been married into that keyboard! And of course every pitch-shifted note sounded like brilliant classic Puppy. Dwayne was a sonic monster.

I was reading somewhere online where people were speculating on the name Puppy Gristle and didn't know that we were referring to "Thee Gristlizer" for that event at Shangi-La and thus the name. It was a little box with filters. It was only one of two handmade by Chris (ov Cozzi). So we bussed the whole mix through that box and Gen twisted its sinister little knobs. Just a day later that magical TG signature-sounding box burned to a small cube of unrecognizable petro-chemical by-product in a 5 alarm fire at the Houdini mansion on Laurel Canyon the night after that infamous gig at Sin-A-Matic when Gen ended up in the intensive care unit. As much as Gen mourned the permanent damage to her arm she (and i) still mourn to this day the loss of Thee Gristlizer.

So it was a time of great tragedy only to be blasted apart by Dwayne dropping his mortal coil. But great musical monster spirits like Dwayne don't die they just metamorphasize into more greatness.

Thee Gristlizer is gone.

== Track listing ==
No.	Title	Length
1.	"Puppy Gristle"	40:11

== Personnel ==
- Genesis P. Orridge (gristle box)
- Dwayne Rudolph Goettel (setup one - digital)
- cEvin Key (setup two - analog)
- Larry Thrasher (percussion)
- N. Ogre (vocal)
- Ken Hiwatt Marshall (engineer and fx)
- Chris Carter (gristle box design and build)
- Simon Paul, Scott Graham (cover layout)
