= Stairs and Flowers =

Song by Skinny Puppy

Single by Skinny Puppy

from the album Mind: The Perpetual Intercourse
- Released: 1987
- Recorded: Recorded at Mushroom Studios 1985, 1986
- Genre: Industrial music
- Length: 24 min 58 s
- Label: Capitol
- Songwriters: Kevin Crompton, Dave Ogilvie, Kevin Ogilvie
- Producers: Dave Ogilvie and cEvin Key

Skinny Puppy singles chronology
"Chainsaw" (1987)	"Stairs and Flowers" (1987)	"Addiction" (1987)

Stairs and Flowers is a single by the band Skinny Puppy from the album Mind: The Perpetual Intercourse.

The song makes use of extensive samples from an episode of the radio drama The Cabinet of Dr. Fritz, titled "Sticks".

== Track listing ==
No.	Title	Length
1.	"Stairs and Flowers (Def Wish Mix)"	6:00
2.	"Stairs and Flowers (Too Far Gone Dub)"	6:34
3.	"Chainsaw"	5:53
4.	"Assimilate (Remix)"	6:31
