= Subconscious Communications =

American record label

- Founded: 1993
- Founder: Dwayne Goettel, Phil Western
- Genre: Electronic, industrial, techno, experimental
- Country of origin: U.S.
- Location: Toluca Lake, California
- Official website: subconsciousrecords.com

Subconscious Communications (originally Subconscious Records) is an independent record label based in Toluca Lake, California. Originating in Vancouver, B.C., Canada, it was founded in 1993 by Dwayne Goettel of Skinny Puppy and Phil Western of Download. The label has been described as a "record label, musician collective, remix team, 32-track digital studio, [and an] analogue synth museum."

== History ==
Dwayne Goettel and Phil Western founded Subconscious Records in 1993 to release a twelve-inch under Goettel's side project Aduck and Phil's alias Philth. cEvin Key arbitrarily took over control of Subconscious Communications when Goettel died on 23 August 1995. Artists previously involved with Goettel and Key joined him to help with the label.

Under the SubCon 'services' page hides two pages listing the competition results of the 2001 and 2002 Cannabis Cup competitions. The Cannibis Cup was an annual competition that only survived an additional year after its inception in 2001. Since the name contains SubCon, it is assumed that the competition was formed by Subconscious Communications.

== Discography ==
Organized alphabetically by author then chronologically (represented by sub value).

- aDuck
  - Power (sub01)
- BananaSLOTH
  - Zombie Battle 2019 (sub36)
- Baseck/Sonic Death Rabbit
  - Creatures (sub37)
- Djoto
  - Slow Motion Burn (sub38)
- Doubting Thomas
  - Father Don't Cry Re-Issue (sub09)
  - The Infidel 20 Year Anniversary Re-Issue (sub32)
- Download
  - Furnace (sub02)
  - Microscopic (sub03)
  - Charlie's Family (sub05)
    - Charlie's Family Re-Issue (sub05b)
  - The Eyes of Stanley Pain (sub08)
  - Sidewinder (sub10)
  - III (sub13)
  - Inception (sub14)
  - III Steps Forward (sub15)
    - III Steps Forward 2nd pressing (sub15b)
  - Effector (sub20)
  - Furnace: REdux (sub30)
  - Fixer (sub31)
  - HElicopTEr (sub40)
- Hilt
  - The Worst of the Flu (sub27)
  - Minoot Bowl Dropped the Ball (sub34)
- cEvin Key
  - Music for Cats (sub16)
  - The Ghost of Each Room (sub21)
  - The Dragon Experience (sub28)
- PlatEAU
  - Music For Grass Bars (sub11)
  - *Dutch Flowers (sub11b)
  - Spacecake (sub18)
  - Iceolator (sub24)
  - Kushbush + Music For Grass Bars (Special Edition) (sub32)
  - Gort Spacebar (sub41)
- Skinny Puppy
  - Brap: Back and Forth Series 3 & 4 (sub04)
  - The Process Re-Issue (sub06)
  - Track 10
  - Doomsday: Back and Forth, Vol. 5: Live in Dresden (sub22)
  - Puppy Gristle (sub23)
    - Puppy Gristle 2nd pressing (sub23b)
  - Back and Forth Series 6 (sub25)
    - Back and Forth Series 6 (sub25b)
  - Back and Forth Series 7 (sub35)
- The Tear Garden
  - To Be An Angel Blind, The Crippled Soul Divide (sub07)
  - Crystal Mass (sub19)
  - Eye Spy With My Little Eye (sub26)
    - Eye Spy With My Little Eye 2nd pressing (sub26b)
  - Secret Experiment (sub33)
  - Have A Nice Trip (sub42)
  - Eye Spy Vol. 2 (sub47)
  - The Brown Acid Caveat (sub48)
- Otto von Schirach
  - Magic Triangle (sub38)
- Subcon Compilations
  - Paradigm Shift (sub12)
  - Wild Planet (sub17)
  - Encore (sub666)
  - Rare Not For Sale (sub444)

== See also ==
- List of record labels
