= VIVIsectVI =

Album by Skinny Puppy

Studio album by Skinny Puppy
- Released: September 12, 1988
- Recorded: Mid-1988
- Studios: Mushroom Studios in Vancouver, British Columbia, Canada
- Genre: Electro-industrial
- Length: 42:54 (vinyl and cassette versions); 60:56 (CD version)
- Label: Nettwerk
- Producers: Dave Ogilvie; cEvin Key

Skinny Puppy chronology
Cleanse Fold and Manipulate (1987)	VIVIsectVI (1988)	Rabies (1989)

Singles from VIVIsectVI
- 1. "Censor" Released: 1988; 2. "Testure" Released: 1989

VIVIsectVI (pronounced "vivisect six") is the fourth studio album by Canadian electro-industrial band Skinny Puppy. It was released on September 12, 1988, through Nettwerk. Despite tackling controversial topics like animal rights, chemical warfare, and environmental waste, VIVIsectVI was well-received. It spawned two singles, "Censor", which was released on the album as "Dogshit", and "Testure", which was Skinny Puppy's only song to chart on Billboard's Dance Club Songs. VIVIsectVI was followed by a theatrically involved tour with Nine Inch Nails as the opening act.

The album saw a refinement of Skinny Puppy's characteristically harsh, mechanical, and sample-heavy sound, with several critics labeling it as the band's best effort. Since its release, VIVIsectVI has garnered critical acclaim and recognition as a landmark release in industrial and electronic music.

== Background ==
After Skinny Puppy's first two releases on a label, Remission (1984) and Bites (1985), the band began to hone its messages and focus on social wrongs. 1986's Mind: The Perpetual Intercourse saw Dwayne Goettel's introduction into the group and marked a shift in Skinny Puppy's sound from dark synth-pop to a more elaborate form of abrasive industrial music. This evolution was furthered on 1987's Cleanse Fold and Manipulate when Skinny Puppy started to experiment with ambience and atmosphere. Dave Ogilvie, who had produced some of the group's previous albums, joined as a full-time member, and work on VIVIsectVI began at Mushroom Studios, Vancouver in mid-1988. The lyrical and thematic elements of the music were refined and made more of a focus on the album; whereas before the music's message was oblique, on VIVIsectVI it became more direct.

Growing up, Skinny Puppy's vocalist, Nivek Ogre, believed that animal experimentation was necessary. After researching the topic, he became more and more disgusted, eventually reaching the point where he was against all forms of animal testing. To compound this disillusionment, in 1983, Ogre's father died and a record distribution company that was set to support one of his early projects dissolved. In the resultant lurch, he wrote a song called "K-9" about the world seen through a dog's eyes. "K-9" became the first Skinny Puppy song and appeared on the group's debut release, Back & Forth (1984). As the band further developed, the idea of life from an animal's perspective continued to come to mind, and VIVIsectVI especially showcased the concept. The album's title, VIVIsectVI, is a pun intended to associate vivisection with Satanism via the roman numerals for 666 coupled with the word "sect". It is pronounced "vivisect six".

== Composition and content ==
"This is our hardest album [...] There's albums in the past that may be a little more grating, but the subject matter and the intensity has been refined to a point now where we can disguise it."

— cEvin Key on VIVIsectVI's sound (1989)

Musically, VIVIsectVI is an electronic industrial album that is characterized by chaos, repetitive loops, and layers. The music, described as "manic" and "dense", presents a sonic wall that is difficult to penetrate upon initial listening. The band emphasizes programmed drum machine loops and rhythms which are augmented by the production to sound overpoweringly mechanical. On the liner notes, a message reads, "Play this music loud or not at all". Ogre's vocals range from low, indiscernible moans to screams and shrieks. AllMusic writer Bradley Torreano noted that Ogre was one of the few vocalists in the industrial genre whose voice "sounded poetic amongst the noise and beats". VIVIsectVI is characterized by its profusion of sounds and noises, often perceived as conflicting or cacophonous, but, as Torreano writes, it never becomes overbearing. Along with all the intensely overwhelming washes of noise, the album incorporates grooves and dance music moments.

"VX Gas Attack"
"VX Gas Attack" highlights the album's industrial programming.

"Human Disease (S.K.U.M.M.)"
"Human Disease (S.K.U.M.M.)" highlights the album's heavy employment of samples.

VIVIsectVI begins with "Dogshit", a song that would go on to become one of the album's two 12-inch singles under the title "Censor". Alongside Ogre's shouted, enigmatic vocals and the loud industrial sounds, a fretless bass leads the song's groove and eventually gives way to one of the band's rare early instances of electric guitar. Following that is "VX Gas Attack", which starts with a protracted newscast punctuated by stilted drum machine beats and occasional samples. The rest of the song continues to criticize the employment of chemical weapons and is built around a repeating percussion loop broken up with further news sound bites and occasional bass. The album's third track, "Harsh Stone White", is slow and "brooding". It focuses on drug addiction, which would be the cause of Goettel's death in 1995. Despite the song's gloomy atmosphere and topic, the synthesized electronics are bright and comparatively optimistic. This contrast between traditionally upbeat, occasionally beautiful sounds and an oppressively industrial tone is an ongoing motif in Skinny Puppy's music, further heightened by the variety in Ogre's vocals, which go from agonized to manic often in the same song.

Kevin Westenberg's photograph of the band from VIVIsectVI's liner notes. From left to right: Dwayne Goettel, Nivek Ogre and Dave Ogilvie superimposed, and cEvin Key

The album's fourth track, "Human Disease (S.K.U.M.M.)", is another song built around and dominated by artificial percussion. Halfway through, the song undergoes a drastic shift from breakneck drum loops to a greater emphasis on electronics and samples. Extremely distorted guitars are employed in the latter section. The track that follows, "Who's Laughing Now", was described by AllMusic as "one of the true classic industrial songs of any era" and was included on the soundtrack of the 1990 film Bad Influence. "Testure", VIVIsectVI's sixth song, was the album's second and more successful single. Labeled a dance music track, it features extensive use of smooth electronics and bass. Even though "Testure" is a bleak track about the violation of animal rights, it acts as a sonic rest from the album's preceding and succeeding assault. The closing lyrics of "Testure" include the album's title, pronounced as "vivisect six". The seventh and eighth tracks, "State Aid" and "Hospital Waste", return to VIVIsectVI's harsh nature, with the former ending in the album's heaviest barrage of beats and the latter being built around a propulsive rhythm punctuated with bass and suffused with wailing, superimposed synth patches. VIVIsectVI's conclusion, "Fritter (Stella's Home)", begins as dark ambient and ends with an intense rush of machine-like drumming.

The CD version of VIVIsectVI contains an otherwise unreleased track, "Funguss", and three additional songs that are featured on the album's singles as b-sides. Cofounding member cEvin Key considered these appended songs as a cross between Skinny Puppy's style and that of some of his side projects, like Doubting Thomas. A version of "Punk in Park Zoo's" is featured on VIVIsectVI's CD release, ending with a cartoonish pitch-shifting effect that is not featured on the version found on the "Censor" single. "Yes He Ran", the album's longest song, and "The Second Opinion" further develop the industrial and sampling experimentation. The latter began as a live jam titled "Snub" and was later refined in studio. "Funguss" closes the expanded album, ending with a distorted and downtuned guitar riff reminiscent of those found commonly in heavy metal music. Skinny Puppy's next album, Rabies (1989), would go further with that metal sound. This direction proved troubling for Key; in a 1991 interview, he said, "we felt that we could come back in and really concentrate on doing a follow-up album to the last real Skinny Puppy album, which was VIVIsectVI, and that to us is Too Dark Park. Rabies was more of a departure."

=== Samples ===
Like most Skinny Puppy releases, VIVIsectVI employs a large number of samples, many of which come from horror films. "Testure" features several audio clips from Martin Rosen's 1982 film The Plague Dogs. "Fritter (Stella's Home)" hinges on dialogue from The Tenant (1976) by Roman Polanski, and the song's name makes reference to a character from the film, Stella, played by French actress Isabelle Adjani. The track concludes with a clip of Jack Nicholson's voice from The Shining (1980) by Stanley Kubrick. "Who's Laughing Now" both contains and is titled after dialogue from Sam Raimi's 1987 movie Evil Dead II. "The Second Opinion" includes the line "that machine has got to be destroyed" from Stuart Gordon's 1986 adaptation of H. P. Lovecraft's From Beyond, and also features the "man of the shroud" sample first used in the closing track "Epilogue" from Skinny Puppy's 1987 album, Cleanse Fold and Manipulate. Politically notable, "State Aid" contains many samples from speeches by American president Ronald Reagan talking about AIDS.

=== Themes and lyrics ===
Thematically, VIVIsectVI focuses on animal rights, animal experimentation, the AIDS epidemic, and damage to the environment. It was the first of Skinny Puppy's albums to be outspokenly political, which would become the norm for the band. "VX Gas Attack" denounces chemical weapons by framing the song in the Iran–Iraq War. "Testure", a lyrically blatant song, brings vivisection into the forefront. About the album's themes, Ogre said that the point of VIVIsectVI "was to give an animal human qualities and show people how a human would react if they were in the same position." He continued, saying, "Hopefully it will keep going from there. If we can get that in there, have people taking the info and responding to it, without thinking about it, that's the whole point." Simon Reynolds of Melody Maker thought Skinny Puppy's approach to difficult topics (that is, facing trauma by mimicking that trauma) was the band's most intriguing quality. He praised "the tension between glamourisation and vilification, sadism and empathy" found in VIVIsectVI's sound and live performances.

These topic are conveyed through Ogre's guttural and cryptic vocals. Though his contributions are abrasive and occasionally screamed, Ogre's work on VIVIsectVI saw him challenging himself to layer more complexity and harmonies into the music. The vocals are fast-paced, distorted, and difficult to actively absorb, often coming in the form of fragmented streams of consciousness. Despite the lyrical obscurity and harsh delivery, the album's messages remain at the core of Ogre's efforts.

== Artwork ==
A test shot of VIVIsectVI's cover demonstrating the involved collage process behind the artwork

Steven R. Gilmore, longtime Skinny Puppy collaborator, created the artwork for VIVIsectVI. The cover, which depicts a mangled blue hand against a black background, comprises a collage of X-ray photography. Gilmore's friend who worked at the University of British Columbia provided him with a stack of X-ray images bound for disposal, and, with a makeshift light table, he made VIVIsectVI's artwork. In 1988 when the artwork was created, it was common practice to use large format Hasselblad cameras to take black and white Polaroid test shots of the piece to verify exposure. In 2012, Gilmore said that it was his favorite cover that he had done for the band. According to Gilmore, the sleeve was designed for the gatefold format, but less than a thousand of those were printed. The distorted photograph of the band that appears on the liner notes was taken by Kevin Westenberg.

== Live performances ==
"Some images are indisputable. If I'm sitting beside you and something visual comes up that makes you feel like this, it's probably making me feel the same way more than if we were sitting and having a conversation."

— Dwayne Goettel on Skinny Puppy's controversial vivisection performances (1990)

VIVIsectVI was followed by a tour of North America that featured Nine Inch Nails, a band inspired by Skinny Puppy, as the opening act. Despite being a full member of the band, Ogilvie was not a part of the live performances. Instead, Skinny Puppy toured as a trio, with Ogre on vocals, Goettel on percussion, and Key performing synthesizers. During live shows, Ogre portrayed a vivisectionist who in turn became the test subject. The concerts were noted for being shocking and violent, with horrifying visuals playing in the background and Ogre acting as a madman on stage.

On October 22, 1988, at Saint Andrew's Hall, Detroit, one of the band's props, Chud (a custom-made stuffed dog fixed with an armature), was stolen by a female fan who went backstage after the concert. Using information provided by another attendee, Key and Ogre managed to locate the woman's address and drive to her home. After retrieving Chud from the back of a parked car, Key and Ogre explained the situation to the fan's parents, who thanked them for not calling the police. Additional drama with Chud occurred a day later on October 23, 1988 during a performance in Cincinnati when two members of the crowd believed that the stuffed dog that Ogre was vivisecting was real and called the police. A pair of plainclothes detectives went backstage and accosted the band without providing any identification. Even after it became evident that no animal was harmed during the concert, the band, charged with disorderly conduct, was arrested and jailed. After a night spent incarcerated, the band was released and fined $200. According to Ogre, it was ironic to be detained for mimicking vivisection when, across the street from the concert hall (Bogart's), was a genuine animal testing laboratory. He later gave an official statement on the encounter: "I find it paradoxical that the police can justify arresting us on the assumption that we mutilate and experiment on live animals for a theatrical performance when the inhuman reality is that it occurs in over 300 laboratories every day."

Songs performed

Remission

- "Smothered Hope"

Bites

- "Assimilate"

Mind: The Perpetual Intercourse

- "One Time One Place"
- "God's Gift (Maggot)"

Cleanse Fold and Manipulate

- "Addiction"
- "Deep Down Trauma Hounds"

VIVIsectVI

- "Dogshit"
- "Human Disease (S.K.U.M.M.)"
- "Testure"
- "State Aid"
- "Fritter (Stella's Home)"

Improvisations

- "Brap"

== Release ==
VIVIsectVI was released worldwide in September 1988. The first several hundred copies released in Canada were in full-color gatefold sleeves; later Canadian pressings as well as all pressings released in the United States were distributed either as non-gatefold vinyl or as CDs in jewel cases. This was the first Skinny Puppy release to contain a picture of the band and was the only to list Ogilvie as an official member.

The album was supported by two singles, "Censor" (titled "Dogshit" on the album) and "Testure". "Dogshit's" name change was suggested by Nettwerk but was ultimately the band's choice, coming from a decision that the single would not sell well if it had kept the original name. "Testure", released as a single in 1989, was accompanied by a music video that depicted a man (who presumably had been abusing his pet dog) being experimented on by a group of surgeons. According to Ogre and Key, the video was pulled from airplay following an internal poll by Citytv, an associate of Canada's MuchMusic. The poll came out nearly split, but, regardless, the video was ultimately banned by "the powers that be". Irrespective of the video's ban, "Testure" reached number 19 on Billboards's Dance Club Songs chart.

=== Critical reception ===
Professional ratings
Review scores
Source	Rating
AllMusic	4.5/5 stars

Upon release in 1988, VIVIsectVI was well-received but generally overshadowed by Skinny Puppy's onstage antics. In his 1988 review, Mark Jenkins of the Washington Post wrote that the album contained the band's "most morose music yet" and commented that the song "Testure" was "characteristically impressionistic but lucidly visceral". In 1989, Jim Aikin of Keyboard wrote, "Somehow, in the midst of the painful audio chaos, the fun comes across." Since then, critical acclaim has grown, with several publications recognizing the album as important to the industrial and electronic genres. Bradley Torreano of AllMusic praised the album's variety and called it "one of their true masterpieces". Another AllMusic writer, Jim Harper, believed that VIVIsectVI led to Skinny Puppy being the "originator of a new musical style." See Magazine said that the album "marks a pinnacle in the band's career, at which they weren't merely peaking as musicians but also as friends," and that it was their "most focused recording". Writing for LA Weekly in 2017, Brett Callwood agreed with Harper by calling the album "genre-defining" and said, "The early Puppy albums are fantastic and important, but by the fourth, 1988’s VIVIsectVI, the group had really hit their stride." Callwood continued, praising the album's percussion effects as genuinely and frighteningly mechanical. In 2012, Chris Morgan of Treble labeled VIVIsectVI as one of the essential industrial albums, saying that the album "is not just mean and abrasive, but vile and scabrous, giving new meaning to the term 'infectious,' when it comes to electronic music." In 2021, Polish writer Jacek Szafranowicz described Skinny Puppy as at its best on VIVIsectVI.

=== Accolades ===
Year	Publication	Country	Accolade	Rank	Ref.
1988	Melody Maker	United Kingdom	"Albums of the Year"	13	
2012	Treble	United States	"10 Essential Industrial Albums"	5	
2017	LA Weekly	United States	"10 Classic Industrial Albums"	9	

== Track listing ==
All tracks are written by Skinny Puppy.

No.	Title	Sample(s)	Length
1.	"Dogshit"		3:55
2.	"VX Gas Attack"	Contains samples of: Various news sound bites	5:36
3.	"Harsh Stone White"		4:29
4.	"Human Disease (S.K.U.M.M.)"		6:18
5.	"Who's Laughing Now?"	Contains samples of: Evil Dead II (1987) by Sam Raimi	5:28
6.	"Testure"	Contains samples of: The Plague Dogs (1982) by Martin Rosen	5:06
7.	"State Aid"	Contains samples of: A speech on AIDS delivered by Ronald Reagan	3:54
8.	"Hospital Waste"		4:37
9.	"Fritter (Stella's Home)"	Contains samples of: The Tenant (1976) by Roman Polanski; The Shining (1980) by Stanley Kubrick; Maniac (1980) by William Lustig	3:31
Total length:			42:54

CD-only bonus tracks
No.	Title	Sample(s)	Length
10.	"Yes He Ran"	Contains samples of: Audio clips of Jim Morrison speaking	6:28
11.	"Punk in Park Zoo's"		2:30
12.	"The Second Opinion"	Contains samples of: From Beyond (1986) by Stuart Gordon	4:59
13.	"Funguss"		4:05
Total length:			60:56

== Personnel ==
All credits adapted from VIVIsectVI liner notes

Skinny Puppy

- Nivek Ogre – vocals
- cEvin Key – synthesizers, guitars, bass guitars, drums
- Dwayne Goettel – synthesizers, sampling
- Dave Ogilvie – production, engineering

Additional personnel

- Steven R. Gilmore – design, photography, typography
- Greg Sykes – typesetting
- Kevin Westenberg – photography

== Charts ==
Chart (1988)	Peak position
Canada Top Albums/CDs (RPM)	94
