= Helicopter (album) =

Studio album by Download
- Released: October 23, 2009; Re-released September 27, 2011
- Recorded: 2006–2007 (Subconscious Studios, Hollywood)
- Genres: IDM, electronica, industrial
- Length: 50:49; 1:10:02 (re-release)
- Labels: Subconscious Communications, Metropolis Records
- Producers: cEvin Key & Phil Western

Download chronology
Fixer (2007)	Helicopter (2009)	LingAM (2013)

Alternate Cover
- Cover of 2011 re-release

Helicopter (stylized as HELicopTer) is the seventh studio album by the post-industrial electronic band Download. Much like Download's previous release, FiXeR, Helicopter features a guest appearance by former vocalist, Mark Spybey. It also puts a prominent focus on analogue equipment, using the oldest machines that Subconscious Studios had to offer.
Initially given a limited release as part of Subconscious Communications' Beyond The Vault series, Helicopter eventually sold out and, in 2011, was given a second pressing and a wider release through Metropolis Records. This re-release is retitled Helicopter + Wookie Wall, and features three additional tracks. According to Simon Paul, designer of the Helicopter's original album art, the art of this re-release will be an amalgamation of the album's original artwork and the artwork he submitted for the proposed Wookie Wall EP.
The song "Message From Gort" is a reference to the PlatEAU album Gort Spacebar, which was also a Key and Western project and released as part of the Beyond The Vault series.

== Wookie Wall ==
For the 2010 "SubCon Beyond Fest", a tour in support of the albums released in the Beyond The Vault series, Download announced plans to release an EP that would be sold during the tour. Though Download apparently went as far as to commission album art, the so-called Wookie Wall EP never materialized during the tour though the title track was integrated into the setlist. Supposedly the band considered the possibility of expanding Wookie Wall into its own full-length album, but in 2011 three of the proposed Wookie Wall tracks were added onto a re-release of Download's Helicopter.

== Track listing ==
No.	Title	Length
1.	"Propeller"	3:31
2.	"Bell 47"	3:45
3.	"HUT"	8:07
4.	"Decadance"	4:44
5.	"Lift"	6:15
6.	"Message From Gort"	5:39
7.	"Radio Silence"	5:36
8.	"Pilots Requiem"	4:00
9.	"Landed"	2:57
10.	"Beati"	6:19

=== + Wookie Wall ===
No.	Title	Length
11.	"Wookie Wall"	7:24
12.	"Casm"	7:18
13.	"Jark"	6:20

== Personnel ==
1. cEvin Key
2. Phil Western
3. Mark Spybey (Guest)
