= Wild Planet (disambiguation) =

Wild Planet is an album by the B-52's.

Wild Planet may also refer to:

- The Wild Planet, a 1973 animated film
- Wild Planet (compilation album) a compilation album by Nettwerk
- Wild Planet, guitarist for the punk band !Action Pact!

== See also ==
- Wild, Wild Planet, a 1966 Italian science fiction film
