= Fixer (Download album) =

2007 album by Download

Studio album by Download
- Released: April 20, 2007; Re-released September 13, 2011
- Recorded: 2006–2007 (Subconscious Studios, Hollywood)
- Genres: IDM, industrial, electronic
- Length: 59:04
- Labels: Subconscious Communications, Metropolis Records
- Producers: cEvin Key & Phil Western

Download chronology
III Steps Forward (2002)	Fixer (2007)	Helicopter (2009)

Alternate Cover
- Cover of 2011 re-release

Professional ratings
Review scores
Source	Rating
ReGen Magazine	link
Reflections of Darkness Magazine	5/5 stars

Fixer (stylized as FiXeR) is the sixth studio LP by the electronic group Download. It is the first full-length album featuring all new material since 2000's Effector. It is also notable for featuring an appearance from former band member, Mark Spybey, who left the band after touring in support of 1996's The Eyes of Stanley Pain.

Initially given a limited release of 1000 copies as part of Subconscious Communications' From The Vault II series, Fixer eventually sold out and, in 2011, was given a second pressing and a wider release through Metropolis Records. This new pressing is fundamentally the same as the first, with the exception of different album art.

During the production of this album, demos were posted on the group's MySpace account under various working titles including: "Gos", "Asspipe", "PE", "Heavy", "Pig & Turkey", "V Steak" and "Dirty".

== Track listing ==
No.	Title	Writer(s)	Length
1.	"Bell Ringoor"	Key, Western	5:47
2.	"Zass Pie"	Key, Western	5:59
3.	"Uhm"	Key, Western, Spybey	8:07
4.	"Krakatoa Pt 1 2 And 3"	Key, Western	4:44
5.	"Neuron Proper"	Key, Western	6:15
6.	"Sorcear"	Key, Western	5:39
7.	"12 Yearsblows"	Key, Western	5:36
8.	"Starving"	Key, Western	4:00
9.	"Eruption"	Key, Western, Schirach	2:57
10.	"Hoorse" (Guest Vocals by Mark Spybey, Additional percussion by Databomb)	Key, Western, Robinson, Spybey	6:19

== Personnel ==
- cEvin Key
- Phil Western

=== Guests ===
- Mark Spybey (3, 10)
- Dre "Databomb" Robinson (10)
- Otto Von Schirach (9)

== Design ==
- Allen Jaeger & Simon Paul - sleeve design, layout
