= Chainsaw (Skinny Puppy song) =

Song by Skinny Puppy

Single by Skinny Puppy
- Released: 1987
- Recorded: 1986
- Genre: Industrial
- Length: 5:55
- Label: Nettwerk/Capitol/EMI
- Songwriters: Kevin Crompton, Dwayne Goettel, Dave Ogilvie, Tom Ellard
- Producers: Dave Ogilvie and cEvin Key

Skinny Puppy singles chronology
"Dig It" (1986)	"Chainsaw" (1987)	"Stairs and Flowers" (1987)

Audio sample
- file; help

Professional ratings
Review scores
Source	Rating
AllMusic	2/5 stars
Nanaimo Daily News	6/10
The Vancouver Sun	Favorable

"Chainsaw" is a single by the band Skinny Puppy. It contains new material, as well as additional material taken from their albums Bites and Mind: The Perpetual Intercourse.

== Track listing ==
No.	Title	Length
1.	"Chainsaw"	5:55
2.	"Assimilate (remix) (R:23)"	6:32
3.	"Cage" (Not included on the American release)	2:20
4.	"Stairs and Flowers (Def Wish mix)"	6:05
5.	"Stairs and Flowers (Too Far Gone)"	6:35

== Personnel ==
- Nivek Ogre
- cEvin Key

=== Guests ===
- D. Rudolph Goettel (keyboards, gadgetry - 1, 4, 5)
- David Jackson (chainsaw - 1)
- Tom Ellard (drums, CDs, effects - 1; tapes, EQ knobs, sampling - 2)
- Wilhelm Schroeder (bass synth - 3; backing voice - 4, 5)
- Mr. D. Plevin (bass guitar - 3)

== Notes ==
- Engineered by cEvin Key and Dave Ogilvie.
- Tracks 1–3 mixed by Key, Ogilvie, and Ogre, assisted by Ric Arboit.
- Additional production, instrumentation and engineering on tracks 4–5 by Justin Strauss and Murry Elias, with edits by Chep Nunez. Remixed by Justin Strauss and Murry Elias.
- Sleeve photography, typography and design by Steven R. Gilmore.
- The front cover art features The Vision of Death and the back cover features Babylon Fallen, both by Gustave Doré.
- Two different versions were released on vinyl; one featuring the original labels (light orange) and one with new labels (pink and green).
