= Music for Cats =

Studio album by cEvin Key
- Released: February 3, 1998
- Recorded: 1994–1997
- Genre: Electronic; glitch; dark ambient; noise
- Length: 73:09
- Label: Subconscious Communications; Metropolis
- Producer: cEvin Key

CEvin Key chronology
Music for Cats (1998)	The Ghost of Each Room (2001)

Professional ratings
Review scores
Source	Rating
Allmusic	2.5/5 stars

Music for Cats is the first solo album by cEvin Key released in 1998.

== Track listing ==
All tracks composed by cEvin Key.

1. "Musik für Cats" – 1:31
2. "Wind on Small Paws" – 6:43
3. "Meteorite" – 10:18
4. "Bird" – 8:35
5. "Blotter" – 4:29
6. "Inside Jam World" – 5:55
7. "Herbalist Rule" – 4:00
8. "Greenhouse Gasses" – 5:32
9. "Have You Ever Felt Like This?" – 5:28
10. "Go Go Boots" – 5:13
11. "Beauty Is the Enemy" – 4:29
12. "Full Circle – 4:12
13. "Grah Statikcat (Electrodes)" – 6:44

== Personnel ==
- cEvin Key - keyboards, bass guitar, drums, synths, guitar, sampler, circuit-bending
- Dwayne Goettel - Synth, electronics on 2, 3, 6, 7, 8
- Genesis P. Orridge - Vocals on 6, 9, 11
- Mark Spybey - Electronics on 5
- Phil Western - Synth on 10
- Ashok Sarkar - Voice on 12
- John West - Flute on 12

== Release ==
The album was released for the first time on February 3, 1998 and is set for an re-release on 12 May 2015 over Artoffact Records in 2 LP vinyl version.
