= Father Don't Cry =

EP by Doubting Thomas
- Released: 1991, 1997
- Recorded: 1990 (Vancouver Studios)
- Genre: Industrial
- Length: 30:22 (1991 version); 41:23 (1997 version)
- Label: Wax Trax!, Metropolis
- Producer: cEvin Key, D.R. Goettel, Dave "Rave" Ogilvie.

Doubting Thomas chronology
Father Don't Cry (1991)	The Infidel (1991)

Professional ratings
Review scores
Source	Rating
Allmusic	2/5 stars

Father Don't Cry is a single/EP released in 1991 by Doubting Thomas. It has been re-released in 1997 on Metropolis Records with additional material. Both versions are out-of-print.

The original version of the song "Father Don't Cry" is included on Doubting Thomas' full-length, The Infidel.

== Track listings ==
=== 1991 release ===
1. "Father Don't Cry (Extended)" – 8:36
2. "Turn a New Leaf" – 8:16
3. "Xcrement" – 5:59
4. "Movie 13" – 3:17 ┼
5. "That Problem Child" – 4:14 ┼

┼ Above tracks appear only on the CD and cassette versions only.

=== 1997 release ===
1. "Father Don't Cry (Extended)" – 8:36
2. "T.H.C." – 4:36
3. "Turn a New Leaf" – 8:16
4. "Xcrement" – 5:59
5. "Movie 13" – 3:17
6. "That Problem Child" – 4:14
7. "Majickal Horse" – 2:23
8. "Come In Piece" – 4:00

"T.H.C." and "Majickal Horse" are previously unreleased. These tracks were recorded in 1994, and added to the re-release.

"Come In Piece" is also included on The Infidel.

== Personnel ==
- cEVIN Key
- D.R. Goettel

== Liner notes ==
Produced, engineered, and mixed by cEVIN Key, D.R. Goettel, and Dave "Rave" Ogilvie. Edited by Anthony Valcic. Additional editing by Marc Ramaer.
