= Sidewinder (EP) =

EP by Download
- Released: April 30, 1996
- Recorded: May – July 1995
- Genre: Industrial
- Length: 31:41
- Label: Metropolis Records
- Producers: cEvin Key & Ken Marshall

Download chronology
Charlie's Family (1996)	Sidewinder (1996)	The Eyes of Stanley Pain (1996)

Professional ratings
Review scores
Source	Rating
AllMusic	4/5 stars

Sidewinder is an EP by industrial music group Download released in 1996.

== Track listing ==
1. "Sidewinder (remix)" – 5:52
2. "Glassblower (remix)" – 3:30
3. "Base Metal (remix)" – 4:29
4. "Chalice" – 3:06
5. "Shemaesin" – 5:42
6. "IM5" – 3:25
7. "Attalal (Haujobb Remix)" – 4:43
8. "Lenge T'Agn" – 1:06

== Trivia ==
- The title of track 7 is misspelled on the packaging of this EP—the song is a remix of the composition originally found on Furnace, where it is spelled "Attalal" (with two "L"s) instead of "Attallal" (with three "L"s). However, it could be conjectured that since a "second" mix of "Attalal" appears on Microscopic, the inclusion of a third "L" in the title intentionally points to this being the third remix released.
