= III Steps Forward =

Studio album by Download
- Released: 2002
- Recorded: 1996–1997, 1999–2000, 2002 (Subconscious Studios, Vancouver & Hollywood)
- Genre: IDM
- Length: 44:59
- Labels: Subconscious Communications, Flesh Eating Ants Records (vinyl)
- Producers: cEvin Key & Phil Western

Download chronology
Inception: The Subconscious Jams 1994–1995 (2002)	III Steps Forward (2002)	Fixer (2007)

Alternative cover
- Second pressing and LP cover art

III Steps Forward is a 2002 album by the band Download. It is a collection of new material, as well as outtakes from their albums III and Effector.

According to Brainwashed.com, the tracks were "on par with or better than those that made the official releases".

== Track listing ==
1. "Sticky Glandstin" (Key/Western) – 3:14
2. "Dakota" (Key/Western) – 4:30
3. "Resilient" (Key/Western) – 3:38
4. "The Itch of Trepanning" (Key/Western) – 2:47
5. "Ratail Comb" (Key/Western) – 3:58
6. "Manmade" (Key/Western/Robinson) – 4:02
7. "Nor" (Key/Western) – 5:59
8. "Walking, Talking" (Key/Western/Torres) – 3:59
9. "D.O.G." (Key/Western/Torres) – 4:14
10. "P.U.P." (Key/Western/Torres) – 4:29
  "Bolantinis Pivoli" (Key/Western) – 1:46

== Personnel ==
- cEvin Key
- Phil Western

=== Guests ===
- Dre Robinson (additional electronics on "Manmade")
- Omar Torres (additional electronics on tracks 8–10)

== Design ==
- Phil Western, Simon Paul & Scott Graham - sleeve design and layout
- Phil Western & cEvin Key - photography

== Additional notes ==
- Part 3 of 7 "From the Vault..." series:
  Limited edition of 1000
- "dediCATed to d.o.g. and p.u.p.
  9/30/1985 - 11/14/2001 - 4/3/2002"
