= The Ghost of Each Room =

tHe gHost oF eAch room

Studio album by cEvin Key
- Released: August 14, 2001
- Genre: Industrial; Electronic
- Length: 50:53
- Label: Subconscious Communications; Metropolis
- Producer: cEvin Key

CEvin Key chronology
Music for Cats (1998)	tHe gHost oF eAch room (2001)	The Dragon Experience (2003)

The Ghost of Each Room (stylized as tHe gHost oF eAch room) is the second solo album by cEvin Key released in 2001.

== Track listing ==
All tracks by cEvin Key.

1. "Bobs Shadow" – 4:59
2. "Tatayama" – 5:52
3. "Horopter" – 6:01
4. "15th Shade" – 3:42
5. "Sklang" – 3:10
6. "Frozen Sky" – 3:52
7. "Aphasia" – 5:13
8. "Klora" – 3:32
9. "cccc4" – 5:44
10. "A Certain Stuuckey" – 9:02

== Personnel ==
- cEvin Key - keyboards, synthesizers, drums, bass guitar, guitar, theremin
- Kenichi Tokoi - Vocals and saxophone on track 2
- Edward Ka-Spel - Vocals on 4 and 10
- Nivek Ogre - Vocals on 6
- Saki Kaskas - Guitar and ebow on track 6

== Credits ==
- Artwork and cover photography by cEvin Key
- Engineering and mixing by Frankie "Pet" Verschuuren and cEvin Key
- Mastered by Rick Essig
- Photography by Bree Thompson
- Photography assembled by Chaos Grafix
- Produced by cEvin Key

== Notes ==
Recorded at Subconscious Studios. Hollywood, California. Studio Klaverland. Nijmegen, the Netherlands. Digital I/O, Los Angeles and on location in Negril Jamaica.

Mastered at Master Cutting Room, NYC

Cover photo is an extract from a painting hanging in the very haunted Rose Hall, Jamaica.

"Tatayama" is actually a remix cEvin Key has made for the Sonic Adventure Remix compilation.

Dedicated to Al Nelson.
