= Spacecake =

Studio album by PlatEAU
- Released: September 14, 1999
- Recorded: 1997–1999
- Genre: Detroit techno
- Length: 69:10
- Label: Subconscious Communications, Metropolis
- Producer: Philth, cEvin Key

PlatEAU chronology
Music for Grass Bars (1997)	Spacecake (1999)	Iceolator (2002)

Professional ratings
Review scores
Source	Rating
Allmusic	link

Spacecake is a 1999 album by the electronic group PlatEAU. The album peaked at number 24 on the CMJ RPM Charts in the U.S.

== Track listing ==
1. "Jack Herrer" – 4:37
2. "Nam" - 5:12
3. "Blueberry" – 3:35
4. "Nocruisin" – 3:46
5. "Super Silver Haze" – 5:54
6. "The Search" – 2:12
7. "K2" – 2:40
8. "De Fog" – 6:48
9. "Phuket" – 4:31
10. "Creature" – 5:56
11. "Spacecake" – 3:31
12. "Bon Bon Bient" – 2:43
13. "Creeper" – 3:25
14. "30 Daze" – 6:56
15. "Satchel" – 3:39
16. "On the Plat" – 3:38

== Personnel ==
- Phil Western
- cEvin Key
- Tim Hill (electronics - 6, 7, 9, 12, 15)
- kaRIN (guest voices - 5, 10)

== Notes ==
The track "Nocruisin", while credited to PlatEAU, is actually a solo piece composed by Philth.
