= III (Download album) =

Studio album by Download
- Released: October 21, 1997
- Recorded: 1996–1997
- Studios: Subconscious Studios, Vancouver
- Genre: IDM
- Length: 62:40
- Labels: Nettwerk, Subconscious Communications
- Producers: cEvin Key, Philth & Anthony Valcic

Download chronology
The Eyes of Stanley Pain (1996)	III (1997)	Effector (2000)

Professional ratings
Review scores
Source	Rating
AllMusic	4.5/5 stars

III is an IDM album by Download.

== Track listing ==
1. "Toooly Hooof" – 4:36
2. "Cunning" – 6:02
3. "Moth" – 6:59
4. "Tunnel" – 3:49
5. "Mzeo B" – 4:31
6. "Streaked" – 4:33
7. "Flight of the Luminous Insects" – 6:11
8. "Beauty in the Eyes" – 6:12
9. "Seeeping Solus" – 6:21
10. "Pleck" – 4:29
11. "Bellshaw" – 4:39
12. "Were" – 4:18

== Personnel ==
- cEvin Key
- Philth
- Anthony Valcic

Additional musicians

- Peggy Lee – cello, 12
- J. Vizary – keys, 8
- Tim Hill – electronics, 7
- Russell Nash – cylon sequencer design, 7

Design

- Dave McKean – artwork and photography
