= Inception (Download album) =

Inception: The Subconscious Jams 1994–1995

Compilation album by Download
- Released: January 2002
- Recorded: 1994–1995 (Subconscious Studios, Vancouver)
- Genres: Industrial, IDM
- Length: 79:58
- Label: Subconscious Communications
- Producers: cevin Key, Omar Torres

Download chronology
Effector (2000)	Inception: The Subconscious Jams 1994–1995 (2002)	III Steps Forward (2002)

Inception: The Subconscious Jams 1994–1995 is a compilation of unreleased tracks by the band Download.

== Track listing ==
1. "Primitive Tekno Jam" (Key/Goettel) – 3:23
2. "Bee Sting Sickness" (Key/Goettel) – 8:04
3. "Weed Acid Techno" (Key/Goettel) – 8:19
4. "Recovered" (Key/Goettel/Philth) – 5:26
5. "Left the Radio On" (Key/Hiwatt/radio) – 3:45
6. "Deepdark Modular" (Key/Goettel/Philth/Spybey) – 3:44
7. "So Easy to Kill" (Key/Goettel) – 7:11
8. "This Is Quality Grass" (Key/Goettel/Philth) – 3:43
9. "Krackerzz" (Key/Goettel/Spybey) – 5:22
10. "30065 Morningview Dr." (Key/Goettel) – 7:55
11. "Dubplate from Ochy" (Key/Goettel/DJ Egyptian) – 5:37
12. "Thats.Our.Process" (Key/Goettel/Philth) – 4:48
13. "Wavestation Phuq" (Key/Goettel/Philth/Spybey) – 5:40
14. "Tweeter Blower" (Key/Goettel) – 4:06
15. "800-525" (Key/Goettel/Philth/Spybey) – 2:44

== Personnel ==
- cEvin Key
- Philth
- D.R. Goettel
- Mark Spybey
- Simon Paul, Scott Graham (cover art, layout)

=== Guests ===
- Ken "Hiwatt" Marshall (electronics, 5)
- DJ Egyptian (vocals, 11)

== Notes ==
Originally sold as an exclusive subscription-only release through cEvin Key's personal label in a limited run of 1,000 copies. It was later sold as a digipak in wider release.
