= The Infidel (album) =

Studio album by Doubting Thomas
- Released: 1991
- Recorded: 1987 – 1990, 1994 (Vancouver & Subconscious Studios, Vancouver)
- Genre: Industrial
- Length: 59:26 (original); 114:17 (re-release)
- Label: Wax Trax! (original); Subconscious Communications (re-release)
- Producer: cEvin Key, D.R. Goettel, Dave "Rave" Ogilvie.

Doubting Thomas chronology
Father Don't Cry (1991)	The Infidel (1991)

Professional ratings
Review scores
Source	Rating
AllMusic	2.5/5 stars
Music From the Empty Quarter	Favorable

The Infidel is an album released in 1991 by Doubting Thomas, two-thirds of the members of the group Skinny Puppy. The project has been called "music for imaginary films". It was originally released in 1991 by Wax Trax! Records (bought 1992/93 by TVT Records), but has since gone out-of-print. It was re-released in 2007 by cEvin Key's Subconscious label, as a "20th anniversary edition" packaged with their Father Don't Cry EP and other bonus tracks.

== Track listing ==
No.	Title	Length
1.	"Clocks"	4:21
2.	"The Moodswing"	5:57
3.	"Father Don't Cry"	5:15
4.	"F862"	5:54
5.	"Yowtch"	3:37
6.	"Hiding"	4:36
7.	"Nagual Tone"	4:01
8.	"The Run"	5:06
9.	"Saved"	3:53
10.	"I.D.L."	4:27

CD bonus tracks
No.	Title	Length
11.	"Whitewax"	4:13
12.	"Theme From Pressurehead"	4:06
13.	"Come in Piece"	4:00

Father Don't Cry (20 Year Anniversary Special Edition Bonus CD)
No.	Title	Length
1.	"Father Don't Cry (Ext.)"	8:35
2.	"THC"	4:36
3.	"Turn a New Leaf"	8:16
4.	"Excrement"	5:59
5.	"Movie 13"	3:17
6.	"That Problem Child"	4:14
7.	"Majickal Horse"	2:25
8.	"Jethro"	3:52
9.	"Cryland"	3:38
10.	"Porthue"	3:41
11.	"Make Me Laugh"	2:16
12.	"Blink & It's Gone"	3:27
13.	"Love Somebody"	0:35

== Personnel ==
=== Doubting Thomas ===
- cEvin Key – synthesizer, programming, drums, percussion, guitar, vocals, sampling, radio, machinery, TV, tapes, bass, production, engineering, mixing, digital editing, reconstruction on SSL Screensound
- D.R. Goettel – synthesizer, sampling, programming, TV, tapes, piano, sound source simulator, bass, production, engineering, mixing

=== Additional musicians ===
- Naomi McCleod – vocals on "I.D.L."

=== Technical personnel ===
- Dave Ogilvie – production, engineering, mixing
- Brian Gardner – mastering
- Tom Ellard – co-engineering on "The Run" and "Come in Piece"
- Brian Shanley – original sleeve design
- Simon Paul – special edition sleeve design
- Anthony Valcic – additional editing on "Father Don't Cry (Ext.)"
- Brad Vance – digital transfer, analogue mastering
- Marc Raemar – digital editing, reconstruction on SSL Screensound
