= The Dragon Experience =

Studio album by cEvin Key & Ken Marshall
- Released: July 8, 2003
- Genre: Industrial, electronic, experimental
- Length: 53:46
- Label: Subconscious Communications; Metropolis
- Producer: cEvin Key, Ken Marshall

CEvin Key & Ken Marshall chronology
The Ghost of Each Room (2001)	The Dragon Experience (2003)

The Dragon Experience is an album by Canadian musicians cEvin Key and Ken Marshall released in 2003.

The model on the cover is Spencer Elden, who was also the baby on the cover of Nirvana's 1991 album Nevermind.

== Track listing ==
1. "Shortwave Connector" – 5:14
2. "Diagnosis" – 3:46
3. "Destructor Beam" – 3:53
4. "Running" (Back & Forth) – 4:08
5. "Metamorphosis (Theme from the Trial)" – 4:24
6. "Maniac Shuffle" – 3:38
7. "The Chamber" – 3:48
8. "Skeletal Mask" – 5:20
9. "Dr Seymour" – 5:34
10. "Incandescent Glow" – 3:34
11. "Ambient Fruit (Chapter 2)" – 10:31

== Personnel ==
- cEvin Key - synthesizer, guitar, bass guitar, drums, percussion, drum machine, tape loops, production
- Ken Marshall - production

== Credits ==
- Artwork by Simon Paul
- Mastered by Brad Vance
- Photography by Bree Thompson and cEvin Key
- Produced and Engineered by Ken "hiwatt" Marshall and cEvin Key
- Written by Ken "hiwatt" Marshall and cEvin Key
- Controller - Spencer Elden

== Notes ==
From The Vault series part 8.

Original pieces written/recorded by cEvin Key at Dog House Studios, 1045 Haro #407 Vancouver Canada 1984-1985

Reworked, produced and assembled at hiwattlabs Los Angeles 2003
