= Microscopic (EP) =

EP by Download
- Released: January 9, 1996
- Recorded: May 1995–July 1995
- Studios: Subconscious Studios, Toluca Lake, Los Angeles
- Genre: Industrial
- Length: 54:22
- Label: Cleopatra
- Producer: cEvin Key

Download chronology
Furnace (album) (1995)	Microscopic (1996)	Charlie's Family (1996)

Professional ratings
Review scores
Source	Rating
AllMusic	3/5 stars

Microscopic is a 1996 EP by industrial music group Download. It was one of the first releases with a lenticular cover. Their previous LP, Furnace, also used this new type of packaging.

== Track listing ==
No.	Title	Length
1.	"Omniman (Remix)"	6:05
2.	"Attalal (Remixed by Biosphere)"	7:17
3.	"Mothersonne (Remixed by Newt)"	6:35
4.	"Noh Man's Land V"	7:41
5.	"Microscopic"	6:25
6.	"Noh Man's Visit"	6:43
7.	"Energy Plan"	12:35
8.	"Papa Papa Mula CWM"	0:58

== Personnel ==
=== Download ===
- Dwayne Goettel
- Philth
- Mark Spybey – artwork
- cEvin Key – production, engineering, mixing

=== Additional musicians ===
- Genesis P. Orridge – vocals (1, 5)
- Tim Olive – bass (6)

=== Technical personnel ===
- Anthony Valcic – mastering
- B. Bob – mixing
- Mark Pilon – art direction, artwork
- Clancy Dennehy – photography
- John Gelardi – CD case renderings
