= Effector (album) =

Studio album by Download
- Released: October 23, 2000
- Recorded: 1999–2000 (Subconscious Studios, Hollywood)
- Genre: IDM
- Length: 46:03
- Labels: Nettwerk, Subconscious Communications
- Producers: cEvin Key, Phil Western

Download chronology
III (1997)	Effector (2000)	Inception: The Subconscious Jams 1994-1995 (2002)

Effector is an electronica album by Canadian electronic music group Download.

Professional ratings
Review scores
Source	Rating
AllMusic	link

== Track listing ==
1. "Carrier Tone" – 4:02
2. "Muscaria" – 5:09
3. "Vagator" – 6:12
4. "Ego Dissolve" – 5:31
5. "The Guide" – 5:27
6. "Chrysanthemum" – 5:03
7. "Ayahuasca" – 3:55
8. "Two Worlds Collide" – 6:44
9. "Affirmed" – 4:04

All songs by cEvin Key & Phil Western, except for "Ego Dissolve" and "Ayahuasca" by Key, Western & Van Rooy.

== Personnel ==
- cEvin Key
- Phil Western

=== Guests ===
- William van Rooy - additional electronics (4, 7)

== Notes ==
The cover is a photograph of an amusement ride in Dresden, taken by Anthony Valcic using a very slow shutter speed.

"Muscaria" begins with a backwards-masked sample from Quebec blues-rock band Offenbach's "Promenade sur Mars".
