= Furnace (album) =

Studio album by Download
- Released: October 3, 1995; Re-released: April 2007
- Recorded: May – July 1995
- Genres: Industrial, electronica
- Length: 74:32 (original); 107:30 (re-issue)
- Labels: Cleopatra (original), Subconscious Communications (re-issue)
- Producer: cEvin Key

Download chronology
Furnace (1995)	Microscopic (1996)

Professional ratings
Review scores
Source	Rating
AllMusic	3/5 stars

Furnace is the first album released by the industrial music group Download. Released on Cleopatra Records in 1995, it is dedicated to Dwayne Goettel, who co-wrote the album but died before its release. The album's cover has the distinction of being among the first to make use of lenticular printing.
After being out of print for years, Cevin Key bought the rights to Furnace from Cleopatra Records and, in 2007, re-released the album through his own label, Subconscious Communications, as part of the "From The Vault II" subscription series under the title Furnace Re:Dux in a limited edition of 1000. This re-issue was advertised as remastered but was in fact the same master as the original release. It did however feature a bonus disc of 8 jam sessions which were the basis of the tracks that would eventually make their way onto Furnace. The re-issue is also out of print.

== Track listing ==
No.	Title	Writer(s)	Length
1.	"Mallade"	Key, Goettel, Spybey, Western,	2:34
2.	"Seel Hole"	Key, Goettel, Spybey, Western,	4:20
3.	"Omniman"	Key, Goettel, Orridge, Spybey, Western	6:00
4.	"Cannaya"	Key, Goettel, Spybey, Western,	8:28
5.	"Sigesang"	Key, Goettel, Spybey, Western,	4:41
6.	"Stone Grey Soil"	Key, Goettel, Spybey, Western,	7:09
7.	"Mother Sonne"	Key, Goettel, Spybey, Western,	4:51
8.	"Attalal"	Key, Goettel, Spybey, Western,	7:17
9.	"Lebanull"	Key, Goettel, Orridge, Spybey, Western	6:53
10.	"Beehatch"	Key, Goettel, Spybey, Western,	7:21
11.	"Noh Man's Land"	Key, Goettel, Spybey, Western,	5:07
12.	"Marred"	Key, Goettel, Orridge, Spybey, Western	9:01
13.	"Hevel"	Key, Goettel, Spybey, Western,	0:50

=== Re:Dux ===
No.	Title	Length
1.	"Re:Dux Part 1"	2:54
2.	"Re:Dux Part 2"	4:34
3.	"Re:Dux Part 3"	7:14
4.	"Re:Dux Part 4"	5:24
5.	"Re:Dux Part 5"	3:03
6.	"Re:Dux Part 6"	4:44
7.	"Re:Dux Part 7"	2:24
8.	"Re:Dux Part 8"	13:41

== Personnel ==
- Dwayne Goettel
- Philth
- Mark Spybey
- cEvin Key
- Genesis P. Orridge (Guest vocals on tracks 3, 9 and 12)
