= Hilt (band) =

Canadian band

- Also known as: The Flu
- Origin: Vancouver, British Columbia, Canada
- Genre: Experimental
- Years active: 1987–1996
- Labels: Nettwerk; Subconscious Communications
- Spinoff of: Skinny Puppy
- Members: Al Nelson; cEvin Key; Dwayne Goettel

Hilt was a collective group of Vancouver musicians, usually referred to as a side project of the group Skinny Puppy. The group comprised Alan Nelson, a seminal member of many local Vancouver rock and punk groups, on vocals, with cEvin Key and D.R. Goettel on instruments.

== Description ==
Hilt emerged from longtime friends Cevin Key and Al Nelson's musical experiments under the name "The Flu." Early recordings consisted basically of Nelson, Key, and whatever friends happened by, playing whatever instruments – actual or makeshift – happened to be around at the time. Hilt became more of a formal affair when Key and fellow Skinny Puppy member Dwayne Goettel relocated to Toronto where Nelson happened to be living at the time. Key and Goettel would bring Nelson into their temporary Skinny Puppy studio setup as a change of pace and a means of experimenting with ideas not typically suited to Skinny Puppy material.

In 1989, Key and Goettel's label Nettwerk made a bet with the group that they could not produce and record an album for a low budget, reputedly $15,000. They accepted, and the result is the lo-fi debut Call the Ambulance (Before I Hurt Myself), a release that Trouser Press characterized as essentially a more "rocked out" Skinny Puppy. An EP followed in 1991, entitled Orange Pony, with the follow-up LP Journey to the Center Of the Bowl.

During the years of 1992–1995, Key and Goettel focused on Skinny Puppy, putting Hilt on the side. After the untimely ends of both Skinny Puppy and Goettel, Key continued recording his many side projects, which included Hilt. Sessions with Al Nelson continued in 1996, with three songs recorded as a result. Al Nelson died from complications due to diabetes on January 23, 2000. Key lamented:

"Al was the nicest and most real person I have ever known. He had a sense of humour that could make anyone smile. He was incredibly talented. He was very dedicated to his friends, and his heart was beautiful. He will be greatly missed."

In 2003, Key released The Worst Of the Flu, an odds-and-ends collection of unreleased and alternate tracks by Hilt and the Flu recorded from 1985–1990. Another recording, Minoot Bowl Dropped the Ball, featuring material of a similar ilk to Worst of the Flu, was released in 2007. According to Key, approximately seven LPs worth of material were recorded in the above time period, and may see the light of day in the future.

== Discography ==
- The Flu, 1987, EP (as the Flu)
- Patsy: A Collection Of Absolute Insanity, 1988, LP (as the Flu)
- Get Stuck, 1989, single
- Call the Ambulance (Before I Hurt Myself), 1989, LP
- Stoneman, 1990, single
- Orange Pony, 1991, EP
- Journey to the Center Of the Bowl, 1991, LP
- The Worst Of the Flu, 2003, LP
- Minoot Bowl Dropped the Ball, 2007, LP
