= Tenebrae Vision =

Studio album by Cyberaktif
- Released: 1991
- Recorded: Vancouver Studios, Vancouver
- Genre: Electro-industrial, EBM
- Length: 46:01 (CD)
- Label: Wax Trax!
- Producer: cEvin Key, Wilhelm Schroeder

Cyberaktif chronology
Tenebrae Vision (1991)	eNdgame (2024)

Singles from Tenebrae Vision
- 1. "Nothing Stays" Released: 1990; 2. "Temper" Released: 1990

Professional ratings
Review scores
Source	Rating
AllMusic	2.5/5 stars
Electric Shock Treatment	Unfavorable
Music From the Empty Quarter	Favorable

Tenebrae Vision is the first album of Canadian industrial band Cyberaktif, which consisted of cEvin Key and Dwayne R. Goettel of Skinny Puppy and former Skinny Puppy member Bill Leeb of Front Line Assembly. For Cyberaktif, Leeb is credited as Wilhelm Schroeder, the stage name he used while in Skinny Puppy. The album was released in 1991 through Wax Trax! and features Blixa Bargeld of German industrial band Einstürzende Neubauten. The project folded after Goettel's death in 1995, and laid dormant until 2024 when Key and Leeb reestablished the name with Rhys Fulber for the album eNdgame.

== Background ==
Tenebrae Vision was accompanied by two singles, Nothing Stays and Temper, both of which were released in 1990 and contain different mixes of the title tracks as well as non-album tracks. The track "Nothing Stays" was voted the sixteenth-greatest industrial song of all time by COMA Music Magazine in their feature article 101 Greatest Industrial Songs of All Time. It appeared also in different versions on various compilation albums.

According to cEvin Key, Cyberaktif is reminiscent of tape trading in the industrial music scene which the band members started off with. "Cyberaktif is [...] the experience of discovering the whole electronic genre", said Key, "[it] is exploring the enthusiasm we once had for that genre." Bill Leeb described their work as "rehashing old things", but said, "it was different this time because we were a bit more established." About the collaboration with Blixa Bargeld, Leeb reported that he and Key were fans of Einstürzende Neubauten and Bargeld happened to be in Vancouver just at the right time. With Bargeld being "an icon to us" and having "major attitude back then", Leeb remembered the collaboration being both "stressful" and "fun".

Tenebrae Vision features samples from the films The Unholy, Videodrome, Dune, and Halloween III: Season of the Witch.

== Track listing ==
All tracks are written by cEvin Key, Dwayne R. Goettel and Wilhelm Schroeder, except where noted.

No.	Title	Length
1.	"The Road Kill" (Written and composed by Key and Schroeder)	3:48
2.	"Brain Dead Decision"	4:17
3.	"Acid Cripple"	4:34
4.	"Paradiessiets" (Written and composed by Schroeder and Blixa Bargeld)	5:57
5.	"Nothing Stays"	5:24
6.	"Ruptured Freeks"	4:14
7.	"Dis Coarse Illusion"	4:01
8.	"Temper"	4:27
9.	"Face to Face" (Written and composed by Key, Schroeder)	4:19

CD bonus track
No.	Title	Length
10.	"House of Pain" (Written and composed by Cevin Key, Bill Leeb)	5:00

== Personnel ==
Cyberaktif

- cEvin Key – engineering, mixing, production
- Dwayne R. Goettel – assistant engineering, assistant mixing, sampler, keyboard
- Wilhelm Schroeder – vocals, production

Additional musicians

- Blixa Bargeld – vocals (4), piano (4), production (4)

Technical personnel

- Marc Ramaer – editing
- Brian Gardner – mastering
