= The Eyes of Stanley Pain =

Studio album by Download
- Released: May 28, 1996
- Recorded: 1995–1996 (Subconscious Studios, Vancouver)
- Genre: Industrial
- Length: 71:09
- Label: Nettwerk/Subconscious Communications
- Producers: cEvin Key & Ken Marshall

Download chronology
Sidewinder (1996)	The Eyes of Stanley Pain (1996)	III (1997)

Professional ratings
Review scores
Source	Rating
AllMusic	4/5 stars

The Eyes of Stanley Pain is an album by Download.

== Track listing ==
1. "Suni C" – 5:29
2. "Possession" – 4:07
3. "The Turin Cloud" – 4:31
4. "Glassblower" – 3:01
5. "H Sien Influence" – 4:45
6. "Base Metal" – 5:00
7. "Collision" – 10:37
8. "Sidewinder" – 4:18
9. "Outafter" – 4:56
10. "Killfly" – 4:04
11. "Separate" – 5:53
12. "Seven Plagues" – 4:48
13. "Fire This Ground (Puppy Gristle, Pt. 1)" – 5:06 (see "Notes")
14. "The Eyes of Stanley Pain" – 4:47

== Personnel ==
- cEvin Key
- Dwayne Goettel
- Mark Spybey - vocals, lyrics, and various other sounds

=== Guests ===
- Genesis P. Orridge (vocals - 5, 11; gristlebox - 13)
- Anthony Valcic (keys - 4)
- Larry Thrasher (drums - 13)
- Philth (keys - 7)

== Design ==
- Dave McKean - design and illustration
- Lorne Bridgman - "Download" photo

== Notes ==
- The track "Outafter" is dedicated to Brandon Lee. It was originally to be used as a Skinny Puppy song for the movie The Crow, though plans fell through. Lee was also a Puppy fan.
- "Fire This Ground" is subtitled as "Puppy Gristle, Pt. 1", referring to the 1994 jam between Skinny Puppy and members of Psychic TV/Throbbing Gristle, which was later released as the Skinny Puppy album Puppy Gristle.
- The inside cover contains a quote from French poet Charles Baudelaire:

"that which is not slightly distorted lacks sensible appeal: from which it follows that irregularity - that is to say, the unexpected, surprise and astonishment, are an essential part and characteristic of beauty"

- The track "Collision" contains a notably contrasting part which is more harmonic and rhythmically concise than the rest of the track. The initiating rhythmic loop of this "embedded" part begins exactly 7 minutes and 7 seconds into the track. "Collision" being track 7 arguably indicates a deliberate choice of timing.
- The track "Glassblower" was nominated for the award for "Best Alternative Video" at the 1997 MuchMusic Video Awards.
