= Phil Western =

Canadian musician (1971–2019)

- Also known as: Philth, Cap'n Stargazer
- Born: Phillip Charles Western; August 12, 1971
- Origin: Vancouver, British Columbia, Canada
- Died: February 4, 2019 (aged 47)
- Genres: Industrial music Experimental music
- Occupations: Programmer, musician
- Instruments: Synth, guitar, percussion
- Years active: 1992–2019
- Labels: The Record Company; Subconscious Communications; Harthouse; Exist Dance; Nettwerk Records; Metropolis Records; Hypnotic/Cleopatra
- Formerly of: Download; PlatEAU; Floatpoint; Off and Gone; Frozen Rabbit

Phillip Charles Western (August 12, 1971 – February 4, 2019) was a Canadian musician, based in Vancouver and a founding member of the bands Download, PlatEAU, Frozen Rabbit, and Off and Gone.

== Biography ==
Having started his career as a drummer and eventually as a programmer, he became a remix engineer starting in the mid-1990s. His friendship with Dwayne Goettel led to him doing a small amount of keyboard work on the Skinny Puppy album The Process, as well as creating the Subconscious Communications record label with Goettel in 1993.

After Goettel's death from a heroin overdose in 1995, he became partners with Cevin Key in several musical projects. As an engineer, or remix engineer, he had worked with Skinny Puppy, Mirror, Bryan Adams, and Nine Inch Nails. He also assisted in remixes of songs written by Monster Magnet and Rob Halford and Metallica among others.

Often maintaining a low visibility in his collaborative projects, it was his solo work which brought his abilities to light for fans of Download - a complex approach to rhythm and programming, and a sense of melody rooted in psychedelia, drones, and space rock.

In 2001, Western became the operator behind The Record Company, which had been the imprint for several releases under his own name, as well as a reissue of the Floatpoint CD "Beam Error".

He died in February 2019 at the age of 47 of fentanyl poisoning.

== Discography ==
=== Solo works ===
- Power/Touched (12" split w/aDuck) (1993)
- The Escapist (1998)
- Dark Features (w/Tim Hill) (2001)
- Therapy (10", w/Tim Hill) (2001)
- Worlds End (2003)
- 4am (2007)
- 1221 (2008)
- Dat Hell (2008)
- Red Eyed Stalker EP (2009, internet release)
- Treatment (2009, compilation)
- Laborandum (2012)
- Forbidden (2013)
- Melodium (2013)
- LongForm (2014)
- Corrected Idiot (1997) (2014)
- Loved and Loathed (2016)
- Neuro-Plastique (2017)
- No Love Lost (2018)
- Phil Western and LongWalkShortDock - Sick Bay - Live at Rifflandia 2013 (2019)
- Phil Western Vs LongWalkShortDock - Live 2008 - The Rim Benefit (2019)

=== Beehatch (w/Mark Spybey) ===
- Beehatch (2008)
- Brood (2008)
- Oh Noh Me (2017)

=== Download ===
- Furnace (1995)
- Microscopic (EP) (1996)
- Charlie's Family (1996)
- Sidewinder (EP) (1996)
- The Eyes of Stanley Pain (1996)
- III (1997)
- Effector (2000)
- Inception (2002)
- III Steps Forward (2002)
- FiXeR (2007)
- HElicopTEr (2009)
- Lingam (2013)
- Unknown Room (2019)

=== KONE ===
- Cirrhotic Psychotic (2008)
- On Daddy's Farm (2008)
- Solip Cystic Mystic (2014)

=== Plateau ===
- Dutch Flowers (EP) (1997)
- Music For Grass Bars (1997)
- Spacecake (1999)
- Iceolator (2003)
- Kushbush (2007)
- Gort Spacebar (2009)

=== XMT ===
- Atlantic Under Clouds (1993)

=== Cap'n Stargazer ===
- untitled EP (12" split w/Commander Mindfuck) (1994)

=== Floatpoint ===
- Beam Error (1994)
- Beam Error (2CD re-issue) (2008)

=== Off and Gone ===
- untitled EP (1994)
- Sigma Receptor (12") (1996)
- Shasta (12") (1996)
- Everest (1996)

=== Frozen Rabbit ===
- 26,000 (2005)
- Twenty Six Thousand (2008)
- Real Lower Limit (2016)
