= Charlie's Family =

Studio album by Download
- Released: Spring 1996
- Recorded: May – July 1995
- Genre: Industrial
- Length: 47:42
- Label: Metropolis Records
- Producer: cEvin Key

Download chronology
Microscopic (1996)	Charlie's Family (1996)	Sidewinder (1996)

Professional ratings
Review scores
Source	Rating
AllMusic	3/5 stars

Charlie's Family is an album by the industrial music group Download. It was first distributed as an independent release of 2,000 copies on Download's 1996 tour, and was later re-issued by Metropolis Records in 1997 in digipak format.

The record is a companion to Jim Van Bebber's film The Manson Family, whose working title was Charlie's Family. Small portions of the album appear in the finished film, whose final soundtrack was otherwise supplied by Phil Anselmo of Pantera and Ross Karpelman.

== Track listing ==
1. "Beautiful" – 4:34
2. "Gristle Dog Corr" – 6:12
3. "Trick or Treat" – 4:18
4. "Fill Her" – 5:07
5. "Tweeter Blower" – 4:46
6. "Catblower" – 8:35
7. "Yes" – 4:04
8. "Interlude" – 5:00
9. "Thank You" – 5:09

== Personnel ==
- Dwayne Goettel
- Philth
- cEvin Key
