= Doubting Thomas (band) =

Canadian industrial band

- Origin: Vancouver, British Columbia, Canada
- Genres: Industrial
- Years active: 1987–1994
- Labels: Metropolis; Wax Trax!; Nettwerk; Subconscious Communications
- Past members: cEvin Key; Dwayne Goettel
- Website: www.subconsciousstudios.com/thomas/

Doubting Thomas was an industrial band formed by two members of Skinny Puppy: cEvin Key and the late Dwayne Goettel. Although considered a Skinny Puppy side project, nearly all the group's music is instrumental. The band shares its name with an American roots band, to whom they have no relation.

== History ==
Key and Goettel began recording together as Doubting Thomas in 1987, but it was not until the duo had some extra time and label interest from Wax Trax! in 1989 that they were able to begin recording a formal album. In contrast to their material as Skinny Puppy and related side projects, Doubting Thomas was explicitly non-vocal, less structured, and "wandering" in form – Key characterized it as "'cryer music,' like music in a movie."

As Doubting Thomas they released an album and an EP in 1991. The duo continued to record occasionally until 1994; Goettel died in 1995.

The album, The infidel, and the EP Father Don't Cry were re-released as a two disc set, first as a limited edition in 2007, and again in 2013. Father Don't Cry was extended with additional material recorded between 1987 and 1994.

Several other Doubting Thomas songs were included in compilations.

== Discography ==
1. 1991 album The Infidel: composed 1987–1990. Released on Wax Trax! Records.
2. 1991 single/EP Father Don't Cry: recorded 1990. The song "Father Don't Cry" was previously released on The Infidel. Released on Wax Trax! Records.

=== Releases after Dwayne Goettel's death in 1995 ===
1. 1997 – Compilation Paradigm Shift. Released on Nettwerk.
2. 1997 – Re-release of Father Don't Cry with additional material. Released on Metropolis Records.
3. 2000 – Compilation Wild Planet included the song "Steps". Released by Subconscious Communications with distribution by Nettwerk.
4. 2007 – Re-release of The Infidel and Father Don't Cry as a 2-disc limited edition on Subconscious Communications.
5. 2013 – Re-release of The Infidel and Father Don't Cry as a 2-disc special edition / digital album on Metropolis Records
