= Dwayne Goettel =

Canadian musician

- Goettel in 1986

Background information
- Also known as: aDuck
- Born: Dwayne Rudolph Goettel; February 1, 1964; High Prairie, Alberta, Canada
- Died: August 23, 1995 (aged 31) Edmonton, Alberta, Canada
- Genres: Electro-industrial; industrial rock; experimental; techno
- Occupation: Musician
- Instruments: Synthesizer; keyboards; sampler; piano; drums; guitar; bass; trumpet
- Years active: 1981–1995
- Labels: Subconscious Communications; Nettwerk Records; American Recordings; Wax Trax! Records

Dwayne Rudolph Goettel (February 1, 1964 – August 23, 1995) was a Canadian electronic musician, best known for his work in the industrial music group Skinny Puppy. Starting his career playing for a variety of acts around Edmonton, he joined Skinny Puppy in 1986 following the departure of keyboardist Bill Leeb. A classically trained pianist, he helped to broaden Skinny Puppy's sound with his extensive knowledge of equipment and sampling. He assisted bandmate cEvin Key on a number of side projects such as The Tear Garden and Doubting Thomas, and helped form the experimental electronic group Download. He also created the independent record label Subconscious Communications with friend and colleague Phil Western as a means to release his solo work.

In 1993, Skinny Puppy moved to Los Angeles to produce their eighth studio album, The Process, through American Recordings. The production was marred by rampant drug use and band infighting, and ultimately halted in 1995 when vocalist Nivek Ogre quit the band. Goettel and Key, in an attempt to salvage the album, returned to Canada with the master tapes. Goettel went into rehab for his drug addictions and returned to live with his parents in Edmonton. On August 23, 1995, Goettel was found dead at the age of 31 in his parents' home; he had died from a heroin overdose. The Process was eventually completed and released in his memory.

== Life and career ==
=== Early ventures and Skinny Puppy (1980–1988) ===
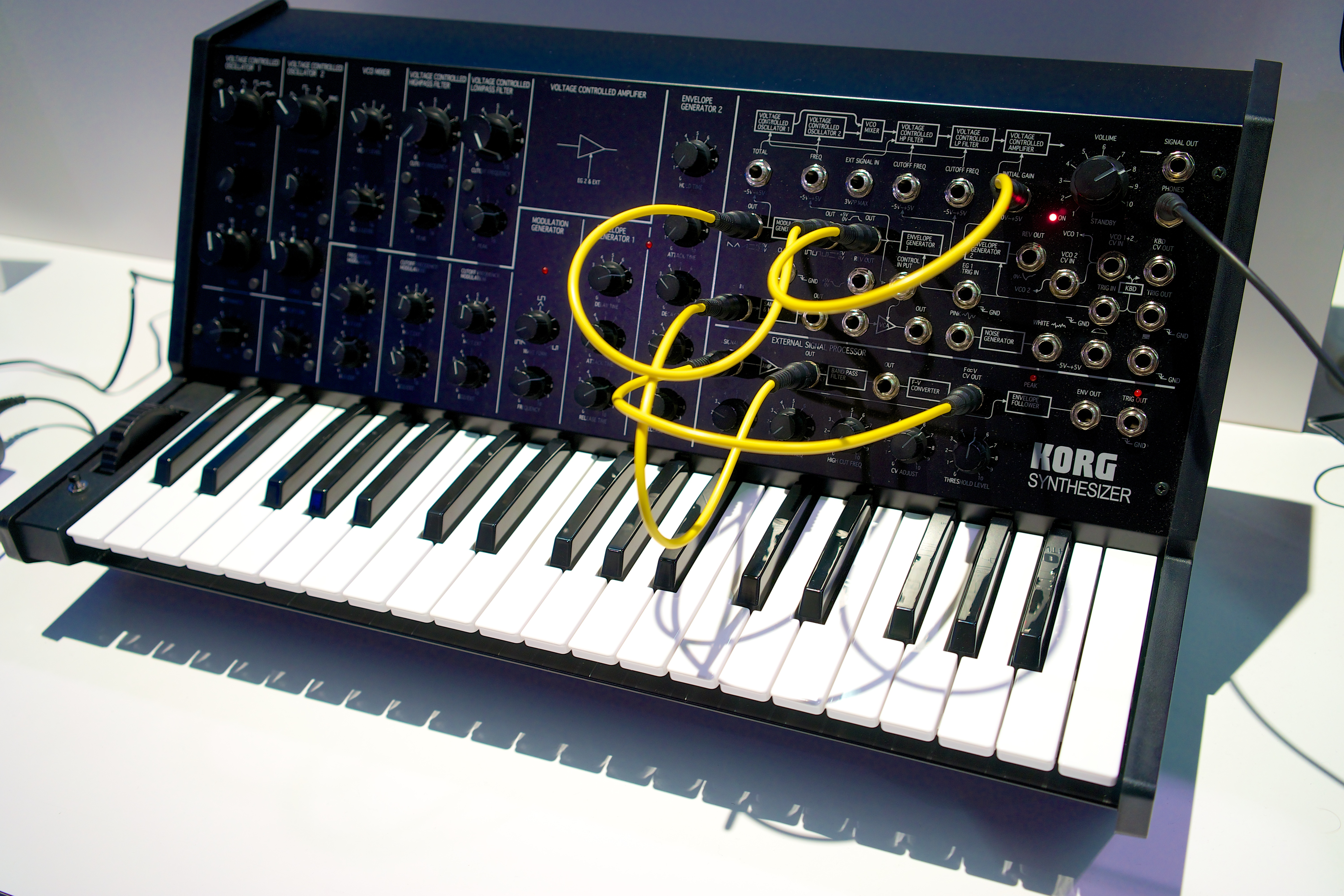
The Korg MS-20 was Goettel's first synthesizer

Goettel's interest in making music developed when his family moved to High Level, where he played trumpet in the high school band. He later moved to Edmonton, where he attended Harry Ainlay High School. While there, he learned to play piano and began participating in the local music scene. His first piece of equipment was the Korg MS-20, which he bought for $800. "I didn't even tell my parents. I'm up in my room, my mom walks in and she's like 'What's that!' And I'm sitting there with all these little keys and buttons going 'piszzshew'". He met Darrin and Stephen Huss in 1982 and formed the band Psyche, one of only a handful of electronic acts in Edmonton at the time. He contributed keyboards for the group and joined them for their live debut in December that year. He was also involved with the band Voice, helping them record their debut EP, Anno di Voce. Goettel formed the band Water with longtime acquaintance Mandy Cousins (also known as Sandy Weir) in 1985. The duo recorded demos in an Edmonton night club called Krieg, but never released their material commercially.

Goettel met Skinny Puppy in 1985 when Water opened for the band as part of their Bites tour. He had impressed founder and keyboardist cEvin Key with his performance and the two befriended each other. Key asked him to join Skinny Puppy when it had become apparent that keyboardist Bill Leeb was uninterested in continuing on with the band. Goettel joined in 1986 during the recording of their second album, Mind: The Perpetual Intercourse, on which he made his first contributions. Goettel's extensive technical knowledge and experience in production helped to bring variety to Skinny Puppy's music and steered them away from their synth-pop roots towards a more uniquely industrial sound. He quickly immersed himself into the group and its musical approach, and began applying new techniques in the band's implementation of noise.

Their sound continued to evolve with 1987's Cleanse Fold and Manipulate, which marked the beginning of the group's exploration into more experimental territory. Their follow-up a year later, VIVIsectVI, saw the group touring in support of animal rights. On stage, Goettel assisted Key as both a keyboardist and percussionist while singer Nivek Ogre acted out his elaborate theatrics. While performing in Cincinnati, an audience member mistook a stuffed dog Ogre was dissecting to be a real animal and alerted the authorities. Two plainclothes officers entered the band's dressing room and arrested Ogre, Key, and tour manager Dan McGee for disorderly conduct. Goettel, who mistook the officers for fans and had been rolling a joint in the corner of the room, was able to leave before the arrests were made.

=== Growing tensions and side projects (1989–1992) ===
In 1989, Skinny Puppy released the album Rabies which featured Ministry frontman Al Jourgensen. The album was a commercial success for the group but had received a mixed reception from fans. Goettel had initially been happy with the album, saying that he enjoyed working with Jourgensen and that it was his favorite Puppy album to date. "We all like it, and I can see the worry in people's eyes, but it doesn't worry us. We did it, and we like it, and I'm not worried about doing another just like it, you know?" He thought it was natural for Skinny Puppy to team up with Jourgensen and make an album, and believed it was the best option at the time. He later changed his position, telling Alternative Press in 1991 that while some of the material on Rabies was good, the completed product was "less within the Skinny Puppy vision", a sentiment his bandmates agreed with. He told Peter Day of WMXM 88.9 that Rabies was simply the result of a crossroads of ideas:

Almost in a way it allowed us to go back and re-emphasize where it is we're coming from in the first place ... I mean, at the time the way things were going, Ogre was exploring a lot of things and wanted to go out and do things and at the same time, Kevin and myself were doing other projects. It seemed natural, it seemed like the thing that was required at that time ... Skinny Puppy fans were writing us saying, 'What's happened to you guys you guys aren't gonna go all hard core on us now.' Obviously were not going to do a Ministry trip exactly. What good is it if everybody is listening to hardcore guitars right now. Skinny Puppy obviously is going to flirt with it, but that's Al's trip, so he can take it and go wherever that's supposed to go.

Conflict arose within the band, with Goettel and Key often siding against Ogre, who they felt had lost interest in working with Skinny Puppy and wanted a solo career. Following the production, Goettel and Key took a brief hiatus from the group and moved to Toronto to work on other projects. The duo formed Hilt with Key's longtime associate Al Nelson and released the album Call the Ambulance Before I Hurt Myself in 1990. Goettel said he preferred the atmosphere when recording with Hilt to that of Skinny Puppy, believing it to be more enjoyable experience. Another project, Doubting Thomas, served to showcase the material the duo had written for Skinny Puppy but was considered "too mellow" to make the cut. Goettel also helped with Key and Bill Leeb's project called Cyberaktif, which he said was his least favorite of the side projects. Pleased with the work he was doing, Goettel was unsure if Skinny Puppy would ever return from the fallout of Rabies. "Just the fact that there was so much satisfaction coming from outside Skinny Puppy led to that feeling of 'The End'".

However, the duo returned to Vancouver and reunited with Ogre at Mushroom Studios to produce 1990's Too Dark Park. A year later, the group were recording their final album for Nettwerk Records, Last Rights. The production was "tense and unhealthy" with the band working in shifts; Goettel and Key would use the studio by day while Ogre came in at night under the supervision of producer Dave "Rave" Ogilvie. Goettel and Key had access to new digital editing equipment which allowed them to spend more time on post-production than on previous records. For the track "Download", Goettel spent two months collecting and composing an array of sounds to be used for the song, and with the assistance of Anthony Valcic, edited them together during a 14 hour long session. That same year, Goettel returned with Key and Legendary Pink Dots singer Edward Ka-Spel for the release of The Tear Garden's The Last Man to Fly, having joined them previously for 1987's Tired Eyes Slowly Burning.

=== The Process and final years (1993–1995) ===
Their contract with Nettwerk complete, the band signed to Rick Rubin's American Recordings and moved to Los Angeles to begin recording their next album, The Process. Rather than work in shifts as they had in the past, the band decided to record the album together, an idea that was pushed by Rubin. The production was frequently stalled due to fires and floods, as well as by the Northridge Earthquake. Band infighting arose once more and was exacerbated by drug problems, including Goettel's increasing reliance on heroin, a drug he once swore never to use. Concerned with the ineffectiveness of American's producers in getting Ogre to write and sing, Goettel joined Key during band meetings to demand that Rave be brought in to assist. Tensions were fueled further by the fact that when Ogre did write, he preferred to work with Key's demos instead of Goettel's.

Amid the chaos, Goettel found time to work on his more techno driven solo work, which he made under the pseudonym aDuck. To release his work, he and his friend Phil Western created the independent record label Subconscious Communications. Together, they released the aDuck/Philth split twelve-inch single in 1993. Limited to 200 copies, the single featured the aDuck song "Power" on one side, and a song from Western (who used the name Philth) called "My Heart is Being Touched By Christ" on the other. Another aDuck song, "Phenethylamine Backwash", was released later in the year on a techno compilation compiled by Bill Leeb and Michael Balch. That same year, Goettel was credited as a keyboardist on Sister Machine Gun's debut Sins of the Flesh. In 1995, he helped Key establish the band Download as a side project to Skinny Puppy. Their first album, titled Furnace, was released following Goettel's death.

Ogre quit Skinny Puppy in June 1995, prompting Rubin to halt funding for the album. Goettel and Key returned to Vancouver with the master tapes in hand, intending to complete the album there. Following Goettel's death in August, Rubin allotted funds so that Key, with the help of Rave, could see to the completion of the album.

== Musical style ==
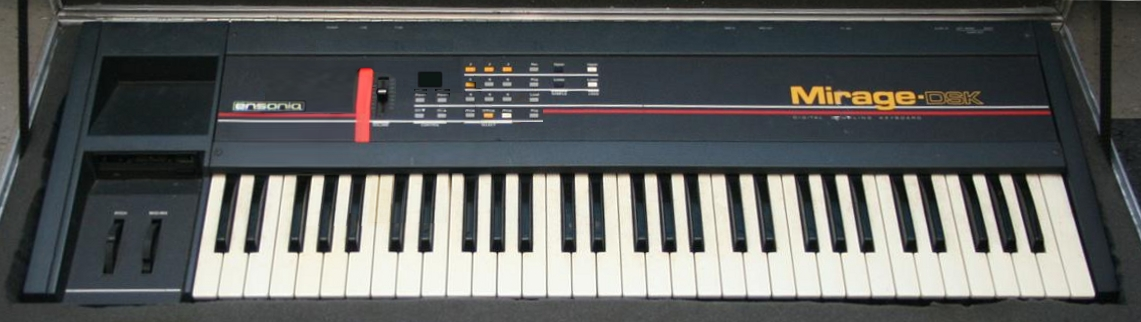
Goettel's experience with the Ensoniq Mirage proved vital to Skinny Puppy's sound

Goettel spoke to Alternative Press on how being in Skinny Puppy helped him jump outside the musical boundaries he had felt confined to in the past, saying "[Key] showed me that when you start on a C, you can play more than just these certain notes, that you can do whatever the moment demands of you, instead of looking blindly backwards". Ogre recalled in 2007, "cEvin had a good sense of melody, but Dwayne was classically trained ... It was part of their duality in that Dwayne shared his vast knowledge of music, and cEvin showed him how to fuck it all up". Goettel's experience with the use of the Ensoniq Mirage sampler proved to be pivotal to the band's evolving sound, with Key dubbing him "the master of sampling". Goettel told the Chicago Tribune in 1992 that he felt joining Skinny Puppy helped to liberate him from the normal conventions of music making:

In all the music I had played before, there wasn't anything about expressing yourself, just rigid lines ... I came into the band with all this knowledge, but that knowledge was very limiting. These guys were sitting around listening to tapes and going: 'Yeah! We can make new sound! We can do anything!' It was a doorway to all these possibilities.

He discovered an interest in synthesizers early in his life and began listening to electronic acts such as Kraftwerk, Devo, Soft Cell, and Yello while in high school. With Skinny Puppy, he used Steinberg Pro 24 software run through an Atari computer to mix and edit their music. In addition to the Ensoniq Mirage, his equipment included the Akai S1000, Yamaha SY77, Yamaha SY22, and the E-mu Emax. Goettel told The Tampa Tribune that Skinny Puppy was attempting to "provide something that makes you question the things you sense", and was uninterested in pushing the band's music towards something more trendy. "It's not like we have to do the things we do, it's more that everything else is already taken care of on the radio - love, relationships, people". Key said in 2001 that he believed Goettel's later work was at the forefront of the "pre-Prodigy style".

== Death ==
In the months leading to his death, Goettel confided to Key that he had not curbed his use of heroin, despite telling others that he had cleaned up. Key and his friends sought to help him and adopted a Narcotics Anonymous style of approach to the situation. Shortly before his death, he had become self-destructive to the point where in one instance, according to Ogre, he had shaved his head and wrapped barbed wire around his arms. After Skinny Puppy disbanded, he spent a month in an Edmonton rehab center before returning to the studio to work on the Download album Furnace. He was later readmitted to rehab where he was placed on suicide watch after slashing his arms. On August 23, 1995, Goettel, age 31, was found dead from an apparent heroin overdose at his parents home in Edmonton.

Goettel's sister had notified Key of his death. "It was the weirdest, oddest déjà vu ... It was almost as though I had lived it in a dream". Goettel's father, Rudy, said his son was a well liked person and had always avoided confrontation with others. He said that the family had received hundreds of phone calls from fans around the world who wished to express their sympathies. Ogre gave his condolences to the family and called Goettel Skinny Puppy's "genius behind the curtain". Key told Chart magazine in 1998 that Goettel was "a ranger and rover" who was thoroughly familiar with psychedelic experiences:

He was endorsing acid all the time and everyone felt he was in control and didn't consider him a risk to hurt himself ... Its [heroin's] rally is the ultimate devil drug in that it fools you into thinking that you can try it a couple of times and you are O.K. ... The recovery from heroin is a really bitter road. It's like you have to get over the flu before you can walk. And I think Dwayne got stuck. He wasn't able to.

Both The Process and Furnace, the final albums Goettel worked on, were dedicated in his memory. Skinny Puppy reunited in August 2000 for a one-off show at Dresden's Doomsday Festival. Rather than hire a new keyboardist, the band left the keyboard station on stage empty in honor of Goettel's memory. Footage Goettel had shot during Skinny Puppy's 1988 Head Trauma tour in Europe was assembled and edited by Ogre into a 32-minute long documentary called Eurotrauma: Skinny Puppy Live In Europe 1988 and released with the 2005 live film The Greater Wrong of the Right Live. In 2010, the band Psyche released the album Re-membering Dwayne, which featured music the group had made while Goettel was a member.

== Discography ==
Skinny Puppy

- Mind: The Perpetual Intercourse
- Chainsaw
- Cleanse Fold and Manipulate
- Addiction
- VIVIsectVI
- Rabies
- Too Dark Park
- Last Rights
- The Process
- Puppy Gristle

Download

- Furnace
- Microscopic
- Charlie's Family
- The Eyes of Stanley Pain
- Inception

cEvin Key

- Music for Cats

Doubting Thomas

- The Infidel
- Father Don't Cry

Hilt

- Call the Ambulance (Before I Hurt Myself)
- Get Stuck
- Stoneman
- Orange Pony
- Journey to the Center of the Bowl

Cyberaktif

- Tenebrae Vision
- Nothing Stays
- Temper

Sister Machine Gun

- Sins of the Flesh

Psyche

- Re-Membering Dwayne
