= PlatEAU =

Canadian electronic music group

- Origin: Vancouver, British Columbia, Canada
- Genres: IDM
- Years active: 1996–2003, 2006-present
- Labels: Subconscious Communications; Metropolis; Cleopatra; Flesh Eating Ants Records
- Members: cEvin Key
- Past members: Anthony Valcic; Phil Western
- Website: SubconsciousStudios.com/Plateau^{[usurped]}

PlatEAU is an electronic music project featuring cEvin Key and Phil Western. The project resembles a very loose approach to the Download project featuring the same members. The song names and album titles refer to the coffeeshop culture of Amsterdam in The Netherlands implying a "trip" through their musical voyages. The album art also reflects this concept with imagery on their first release on Hypnotic Records in 1997, Music for Grass Bars. This release had a special CD jewel case in order to create a holographic-motion effect with the cover art insert. The genre is most closely related to IDM, experimental, techno and trip hop.

== Discography ==
- 1997: Music for Grass Bars
- 1999: Spacecake – #24 CMJ RPM Charts
- 2002: Iceolator
- 2007: Kushbush
- 2009: Gort Spacebar
