= Download (band) =

Canadian electronic music group

- Origin: Vancouver, British Columbia, Canada
- Genres: IDM; post-industrial; ambient techno; experimental
- Years active: 1994–present
- Labels: Subconscious Communications; Nettwerk; Cleopatra; Metropolis; Flesh Eating Ants Records
- Spinoffs: PlatEAU
- Spinoff of: Skinny Puppy; Off & Gone; Dead Voices on Air
- Members: cEvin Key
- Past members: Phil Western (d. 2019); Mark Spybey; Dwayne Goettel (d. 1995); Anthony Valcic; Ken Marshall
- Website: SubconsciousStudios.com/Download

Download is a Canadian electronic music group formed by Dwayne Goettel and Kevin Crompton (aka cEvin Key) of Skinny Puppy in 1994. The initial lineup also included, Off & Gone's Phil Western and Mark Spybey of Dead Voices on Air, but has since been particularly fluid, with Key and Western being the only constant members following Goettel's death. Download's music has been described as post-industrial, drawing from the band's genesis as part of Skinny Puppy but also sharing common stylistic ground with such artists as Aphex Twin and Autechre. The primary instrumentation common throughout their albums is a blend of synthesizers and sampled instruments; the music is particularly centered on the elements of percussion and rhythm.

Other artists that have been involved are Genesis P. Orridge, Anthony Valcic, Bill Van Rooy, and Ken Marshall. Earlier releases frequently included vocal elements and lyrics, but since III (and Mark Spybey's departure in 1996) their work has been strictly instrumental.

== History ==
=== Formation ===
As tensions within Skinny Puppy began to mount in the early nineties, band members Dwayne Goettel and cEvin Key began experimenting with musical improvisations that they felt were more true to their "roots". Early on, the duo brought in Mark Spybey who Key had met in Vancouver some years previous through Spybey's involvement with Zoviet France. The name for the band came from the last track on Skinny Puppy's album Last Rights, an especially abstract track for the band produced by Goettel and Anthony Valcic.

=== Furnace and Microscopic ===
In the first era of Download's career, the band's sound was an Experimental Industrial style which featured vocals by Mark Spybey and guest vocals by Genesis P. Orridge. Their first LP, Furnace, was arguably their least accessible — most of the tracks lasted for over four minutes, some lasting as long as nine minutes. Their next release, the Microscopic EP continued this style. It featured three remixes of tracks from Furnace (only one of which was remixed by the band itself, the other two were remixed by Biosphere and Newt), along with five original tracks.

=== Charlie's Family ===
Charlie's Family was another experimental industrial LP by Download, except this LP was a soundtrack to the movie of the same name, and it had significantly different sound than the previous two releases. Instead of the beat-oriented music that dominated Furnace and Microscopic, this LP's music was mostly dominated by a simple beat along with many samples of anything from women orgasming to airplanes taking off.

=== The Eyes of Stanley Pain and Sidewinder ===
The Eyes of Stanley Pain, arguably Download's most diverse-sounding and accessible industrial album, was released in 1996. It spanned 14 tracks, most of which were about four or five minutes long. The only exceptions were the tracks "Glassblower" and "Collision", which were 3:02 and 10:38, respectively. Later that year, the EP Sidewinder was released by the band. In the same vein as their first EP - Microscopic - it contained eight tracks, of which four were remixes. Three were remixes by Download of songs from The Eyes of Stanley Pain, and one was a remix of the song "Attalal" from Furnace by the band Haujobb (although the packaging of Sidewinder spells it "Attallal"). The other four songs were original songs recorded by Download, and the last of Download's post-industrial era.

=== III and Effector ===
III marked a turning point for Download. Their sound became more melodic and accessible while still retaining the experimental quirks of their older material. Their next album Effector continued this direction and peaked at #12 on the CMJ RPM Charts in the U.S.

=== III Steps Forward and Inception ===
Two more albums, III Steps Forward and Inception were released as part of Subconscious Studio's From The Vault series. Inception contained outtakes from Download's more experimental early era, while III Steps Forward included outtakes from the III and Effector eras as well as new tracks. Although the original pressing of each was limited to 1000 copies, 2nd pressing editions are currently available from Subconscious Studio's website.

=== Fixer ===
In December 2006, cEvin Key announced that new material has been recorded for a new album (titled Fixer). The album was released in April 2007.

=== HElicopTEr & Wookie Wall ===
In late 2009, Subconscious Communications announced the release of the Beyond the Vault series. With it, a new Download album titled HElicopTEr was included in the series which was written by cEvin Key and Phil Western with a guest appearance by Mark Spybey. As stated on the official Subconscious Communications website, the album employs some of the oldest synthesizers the studio has in its collection. The result differs from the more ambient releases of Effector and Fixer and is more akin to Download's previous works such as Furnace or Charlie's Family.

For the 2010 "SubCon Beyond Fest", a tour in support of the albums released in the Beyond The Vault series, Download announced plans to release an EP that would be sold during the tour. Though Download apparently went as far as to commission album art, the so-called Wookie Wall EP never materialized during the tour though the title track was integrated into the setlist. Supposedly the band considered the possibility of expanding Wookie Wall into its own full-length album, but in 2011 three of the proposed Wookie Wall tracks were added onto a re-release of Download's Helicopter.

A special-edition of Furnace (Furnace Re:dux) was also released with Subconscious' From the Vault II series. The new release includes a second disc with a collection of the live jams and improvisations that were the basis of the finished album.

=== LingAM ===
On June 11, 2013, Download released their ninth studio album Lingam. In Hindu scripture, the lingam is the beginning-less and endless cosmic pillar, symbolizing the infinite nature of Shiva. Lingam employs some of the band's more ambient styles featured on previous albums like Effector and Fixer.

=== Unknown Room ===
On March 8, 2019, Download released their eleventh studio album Unknown Room. From the bandcamp listing: "Unknown Room is the project's 11th studio album, recorded in Los Angeles over a several-year period, culminating in a recent two-month session in the Fall that Key describes as being "extremely intense." Unknown Room is the last album to feature Phil Western who died while the album was being prepared for release in 2019.

== Discography ==
Title	Release date	Label	Notes
Furnace	October 3, 1995	Cleopatra, Subconscious Communications	Re-released in 2007 as part of the Vault II series with bonus disc
Microscopic (EP)	January 9, 1996	Cleopatra, Subconscious Communications	
Charlie's Family	1996	Metropolis, Subconscious Communications	
Sidewinder (EP)	April 30, 1996	Nettwerk	
The Eyes of Stanley Pain	May 28, 1996	Nettwerk, Subconscious Communications	Music video for "Glassblower" directed by William Morrison
III	October 21, 1997	Nettwerk, Subconscious Communications	
Effector	October 24, 2000	Nettwerk, Subconscious Communications	
Inception: The Subconscious Jams 1994-1995 (Compilation)	January, 2002	Subconscious Communications	From the Vault #1 (of 7), Limited to 1000 copies
III Steps Forward	April, 2002	Subconscious Communications	From the Vault #3 (of 7), Limited to 1000 copies
Fixer	April, 2007	Subconscious Communications	From the Vault II
Helicopter	2009	Subconscious Communications	Beyond the Vault
LingAM	2013	Subconscious Communications	Metropolis Mail-order
Unknown Room	March 8, 2019	Artoffact Records	
44 Days (EP)	July 12, 2019	Artoffact Records	
