= CEvin Key =

Canadian musician and producer

cEvin Key
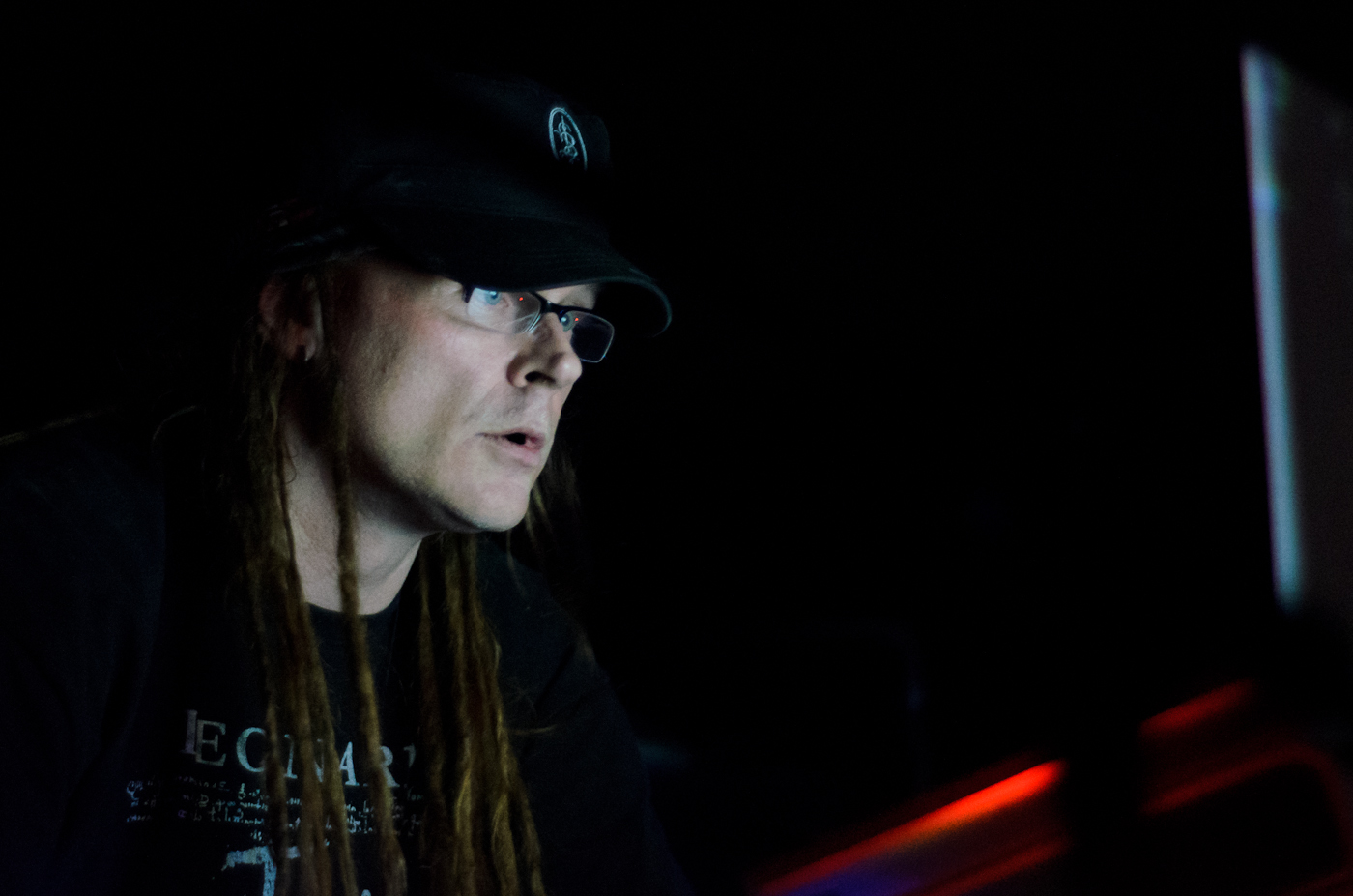
- cEvin Key performing in San Francisco, 2011

Background information
- Also known as: Scaremeister
- Born: Kevin William Crompton; February 13, 1961 (age 65)
- Origin: Vancouver, British Columbia, Canada
- Genres: Electro-industrial; industrial rock; experimental
- Occupations: Musician; producer; composer; multi-instrumentalist
- Instruments: Synthesizer; keyboards; drums; guitar; bass
- Years active: 1980–present
- Labels: Subconscious Communications; Synthetic Symphony; Nettwerk Records; Metropolis Records; American Recordings; Wax Trax! Records
- Spouse: Reanna Taylor (m. 2017)
- Website: Subconscious Communications

Kevin William Crompton (born February 13, 1961), known professionally as cEvin Key, is a Canadian musician, songwriter, producer, and composer. He is best known as a member of the industrial music group Skinny Puppy, which he co-founded in 1982 with singer Nivek Ogre. Initially a side project while he was with the new wave band Images in Vogue, Skinny Puppy quickly became his primary musical outlet after landing a record deal with Nettwerk Records in 1984.

When Skinny Puppy disbanded in 1995 following the death of keyboardist Dwayne Goettel, Key's main project became the electronic noise group Download, whose first album, Furnace, was released that same year. His first solo album, Music For Cats, was released in 1998 on Subconscious Communications, an independent record label he took over following Goettel's death. He reunited with Ogre in 2000 for a one-off performance as Skinny Puppy at the Doomsday Festival in Dresden. The pair officially reformed Skinny Puppy in 2003 and released The Greater Wrong of the Right a year later. They have since released the albums Mythmaker, HanDover, and Weapon.

In addition to his work with Skinny Puppy and Download, Key has had several side projects, most notably The Tear Garden, a project started in 1985 with Legendary Pink Dots singer Edward Ka-Spel. His other projects include platEAU, Doubting Thomas, Cyberaktif, and Hilt.

== Early life ==
Key was raised in Vancouver in what he considered a dysfunctional family. Due to an alcohol problem their father developed following his service in World War II, he and his siblings, an older brother and younger sister, had to learn to fend for themselves at a young age. His mother, who he considered "glammy", often put makeup on him and was untroubled with his use of marijuana. His father initially disapproved of his behavior, but changed his attitude when Key began dyeing his hair at the age of 17 and would later come to fully support his career as a musician. Key would often turn to music as a way to escape his home life and the difficulties of high school, and he soon found himself learning to use drums and synthesizers.

I had a weird and very dysfunctional family. There's no training for dysfunction ... Luckily my family had a piano and an organ that had one of those weird drum machines in it, and I sort of had the luck to be able to have these things around me, to take out frustrations on.

In 1978, his parents sent him to live in Japan with a Japanese family, an experience that he considered valuable to his development as an individual. He was required to learn Japanese as his surrogate family, who treated him as a son, could not speak English. He said of his experience: "When you are that age, a whole new culture is a major upheaval. But for the better". He had been planning to live in Japan and was offered a job at a Tokyo radio station as an interviewer when he received an invite from Gary Smith to join Images in Vogue.

== Career ==
=== Early musical work ===
Key began his career in the late 1970s playing as a drummer for the Vancouver rock band Bastille. He also performed as a multi-instrumentalist in the punk band Illegal Youth, which featured Al Nelson, the future vocalist of Hilt. In 1981, Key joined Images in Vogue, a successful new wave group based in Vancouver who had put out an ad looking for musicians with their own equipment. Dave Ogilvie, a local music student, also joined the group as a producer and engineer. Taking up the role as the band's drummer, Key utilized a Simmons electronic drum kit. The band found success touring throughout Canada and opening for groups such as Depeche Mode and Roxy Music.

Images in Vogue released their first single, "Breaking Up", in April 1982, and their first EP, Educated Man, shortly thereafter. The EP was a success, selling 10,000 copies in a span of six weeks and topping a number of college radio station playlists. Bill Leeb, Key's friend from Vancouver's late-night club circuit, had introduced him to early industrial bands such as Throbbing Gristle and Cabaret Voltaire, and he soon found himself recording his own songs.

Key met Nivek Ogre (Kevin Ogilvie) at a party in late 1982 and asked him to provide vocals for the songs he had made. Ogre accepted and the pair recorded the song "K-9" under the name Skinny Puppy. The pair began using stage names to avoid the confusion of having two people named Kevin in the same band. Key left Images in Vogue in 1985 shortly after the release of their first album, In the House, to focus solely on Skinny Puppy.

=== Skinny Puppy ===
According to Key, the concept behind Skinny Puppy was to create music from the point of view of a dog whose "tail's trodden on" and can only bark and growl. The self-published EP Back & Forth was released in 1984; only 35 copies of the tape were produced. Key brought in Leeb (under the name Wilhelm Schroeder) and Dave "Rave" Ogilvie to help record their second EP, Remission. Terry McBride helped pay for the production and signed them to his new indie label, Nettwerk Records. A follow-up LP, Bites, was released the following year.

Key hired Dwayne Goettel to play with Skinny Puppy in 1986 after it had become apparent that Leeb was uninterested in touring. Key felt that Goettel's technical abilities and knowledge of sampling helped give the band a new identity. Key's partnership with Goettel strained his relationship with Ogre, who they felt was more interested in pursuing a solo career. Key was displeased with Ogre inviting Al Jourgensen for the 1989 production of Rabies, telling Alternative Press that he believed Jorgensen had intended to break the band up. Key's relationship with Ogre continued to worsen during the recording of Last Rights. In a 1991 interview with Propaganda magazine, he expressed his frustration regarding the recording of the album:

Ogre is a different person from what I first knew, and I just can't bear to deal with it. It's something that I have to walk away from ... Every year there seems to be a promise and hope that we'll be able to talk, and we'll forget about all the things that have a lot to do with ego. Forget about ego and get into the studio and do something we originally wanted to do, which is just to make music that we'll listen to and be genuine fans of.

When their contract with Nettwerk ended in 1992, the band signed with Rick Rubin's American Recordings and moved to Los Angeles to begin recording The Process. Ogre quit the band in 1995 and Goettel died of a heroin overdose shortly thereafter; Key managed to salvage The Process, and released it in 1996. He disbanded Skinny Puppy following Goettel's death, saying, "I found it appropriate at the time to put an end to the group ... It's always difficult when you lose a close friend like that". In 1998, Key ran into Ogre at a Bauhaus reunion concert and discussed the possibility of working together in the future. As his relationship with Ogre improved, German promoters began asking if they would be interested in performing as Skinny Puppy once more. On August 20, 2000, Key and Ogre reunited in for a one-off performance as Skinny Puppy at the Doomsday Festival in Dresden, and in 2001 Key performed with Ogre as a touring drummer for the latter's ohGr project.

The pair reformed Skinny Puppy in 2003 and signed with European label SPV, releasing The Greater Wrong of the Right a year later. Key said that the way the band recorded music had not changed much from before, but that the advancement of technology had greatly improved the process. The band followed the album with the release of Mythmaker in 2007 and HanDover in 2011. Skinny Puppy released the album Weapon in 2013 and later sent an invoice totaling $666,000 to the US Department of Defense for the use of its music during torture sessions at Guantanamo Bay detention camp. Key explained that he was troubled by the use of their music as a means of torture and that the invoice was not meant for "financial gain".

=== Download ===
Download was created by Key and Goettel as a Skinny Puppy side project in 1995. Other members included Anthony Valic, Ken Marshall, Phil Western, and Mark Spybey from Dead Voices on Air. Download was named after the closing track off Last Rights and sought to create music by way of " fragments of sound and collages". Key told Terrorizer magazine that he thought of Goettel as "an unrecognized pioneer" of electronic music and, following Goettel's death, used Download as a means of keeping his spirit alive.

I heard things that I've never heard before coming out of Dwayne's end of stuff. Typically, only a small percentage of it got saved or recorded in actual pieces. I know what I learned from Dwayne. He was a brilliant teacher and he's really blown a lot of people away.

Download released their first album, Furnace, in 1995. The album was dedicated to Goettel's memory and featured contributions from Genesis P-Orridge. They followed up their debut with two EPs in 1996, Microscopic and Sidewinder. The band released their second full length effort, The Eyes of Stanley Pain, through Nettwerk Records. Key would use live performances to play "Download versions" of songs from old projects like Skinny Puppy. He said, "we don't sing Ogre's lyrics. We do instrumental versions of key segments of some of the older material". Charlie's Family, produced by the band as the soundtrack for Jim Van Bebber's film of the same name, was given a limited release before the film's completion. Van Bebber, who had done video work for Skinny Puppy, approached Key to write music for the film; Key's goal in making the soundtrack was to create something that was "uneasy, unsettling, just plain old uncomfortable". The album III was released on October 21, 1997, and acted as a companion piece to The Eyes of Stanley Pain. With III, Key began to tone down the industrial aspects of his style for a more electronica sound.

The band continued into the new millennium with the release of Effector in 2000 and Fixer in 2007. In late 2018, Key announced that he and Western had finished work on a new album titled Unknown Room and that it would be released March 8, 2019, through Artoffact Records. According to a press release, the album resulted from "an intense two month studio session" following several years of on-off production.

=== The Tear Garden ===
Key came in contact with The Legendary Pink Dots by way of The Elephant Table, a compilation tape shared within the tape trading community. He met Pink Dots singer Edward Ka-Spel in 1985 while working as a sound engineer on Ka-Spel's solo tour. Key presented Ka-Spel with some recordings he had made, believing that Ka-Spel's voice would work well with them; Ka-Spel agreed after listening to the tapes. The pair formed The Tear Garden soon after and, with Dave Ogilvie as producer, released a self-titled EP later in the year. Goettel joined Key and Ka-Spel for the release of Tired Eyes Slowly Burning in 1987. The album featured the song "You and Me and Rainbows", which ran close to 17 minutes long. The album was noted for using a mixture of psychedelia and electronic influences.

The band released the albums The Last Man to Fly and Sheila Liked the Rodeo in 1992, both the product of a single five hour recording session. Key said that most of the material from Sheila Liked the Rodeo was recorded by engineers in secret while the band was in the midst of a jam session. Key said of the recording session:

There's a certain greatness to knowing that the tape isn't rolling and knowing that the song that you're playing is simply the last time you'll ever hear it, if your in a jamming, improvisational mode. And then going in and hearing that somebody actually recorded it is just ... the ultimate gift I guess.

Their 1996 album To Be an Angel Blind, the Crippled Soul Divide featured a more subdued style in the wake of Goettel's death, and they returned in 2000 to release Crystal Mass. Starting in 2016, the band ran a successful PledgeMusic campaign to support their new album, The Brown Acid Caveat, which was released on July 7, 2017.

=== Subconscious Communications and solo work ===
Goettel and Western had created the label Subconscious Communications in 1993 as a means of releasing material for the aDuck project. Following Goettel's death, Key took control of the label and initially used it to release Download and Tear Garden albums. He later opened the label to other musicians, particularly those he had worked with in the past. The unsupportive attitude taken by American Recordings during the production of The Process led to the construction of the Subconscious studio, where most of Key's projects are recorded and manufactured. He believed the creation of the label was a natural consequence to being involved in the music industry and used it to "license the appropriate releases to the appropriate labels". The labels Subconscious Communications worked with included Cleopatra Records, Metropolis Records, and Nettwerk, among others.

Key's first solo album, Music for Cats, was released on February 3, 1998. The album's subtitle read "Subconscious Music Orchestra under the direction of CEvin Key". The album was made by assembling unused music from The Process into "collages of free-form ambience". He used his pet cats to help make portions the album, sometimes allowing them to walk across keyboards to see what sounds they would come up with. He moved Subconscious Communications to Los Angeles in 1998 and worked on his next solo album, The Ghost of Each Room, which was released on August 14, 2001. The album featured vocal work by Ogre on the track "Frozen Sky". The artwork for his next album, The Dragon Experience, featured Spencer Elden who had been featured on the cover of Nirvana's Nevermind. The photo, taken by Key's girlfriend, was inspired by a dream he had at age 11.

In 2011, Key held the SUBcon Beyond Fest in Santa Monica which featured a number of artists signed Subconscious Communications, including Phil Western, Mark Spybey, Download, PlaTEAU, and Tokyo Decadence, and local talent such as Cyrusrex and Wet Mango. Using the name Scaremeister, Key released 31 Spirits in 2014, a compilation of musical pieces he produced for horror film trailers. The name Scaremeister came when Arnold Schwarzenegger referred to Key as "the scare meister" while he finished work on the score for End of Days. In 2018, Key released Brap and Forth vol. 8, a collection of early musical experiments from before Skinny Puppy.

=== Other projects ===
Cyberaktif is a collaboration between key and Bill Leeb from the band Front Line Assembly, Their first album, Tenebrae Vision, was released in 1991 through Wax Trax! Records. featuring Dwayne Goettel acting predominantly as a support musician. The song "Paradiessets" featured vocals from Blixa Bargeld of Einstürzende Neubauten. In February 2024, Cyberaktif released a new album titled eNdgame, featuring the lineup of cEvin Key, Bill Leeb, and Rhys Fulber. The band Hilt, a collaboration between Key and Geottel, and Al Nelson, started when Nettwerk challenged the group to produce an album for as little money as possible. The group released two albums, Call the Ambulance Before I Hurt Myself and Journey to the Center of the Bowl, in 1990 and 1991, respectively, before Nelson's death in 2000. In 2018, Key released a number of rediscovered recordings from when the band was called "The Flu". Another collaboration started by Key and Goettel in 1990 was Doubting Thomas, the purpose of which was to produce "soundtracks for movies that never existed". They released their sole album, The Infidel, in 1991 through Wax Trax! Records.

Following the disbandment of Skinny puppy in 1995, Key formed PlaTEAU with Western and Valic. PlatEAU, which signed to Cleopatra subsidiary Hypnotic, released their first album, Music for Grass Bars, on May 20, 1997. The band's follow-up, 1999's SpacEcake, was described by Exclaim!'s Matt Mernagh as being more akin to Aphex Twin and Autechre than any of Key's previous work. 2007 saw the release of Kushbush + Music for Grass Bars, the first disc of which contained new music while the second disc featured a special edition of Music for Grass Bars.

== Musical style ==
Key's initial interest in experimenting with electronic music came from a dream he had as a kid; this dream was depicted on the cover of his 2003 album The Dragon Experience. Later on, he discovered a publication called Contact List for Electronic Music by Alex Douglas, which introduced him to the tape-trading community. He named Throbbing Gristle, Cabaret Voltaire, Portion Control, and the album The Bridge by Thomas Leer and Robert Rental as early influences on Skinny Puppy. In an interview with Alternative Press, he mentioned Fad Gadget, The Human League, John Foxx, Bourbonese Qualk, and Mark Stewart as having a large impact on him in his youth. He credits his style of drumming to an interest in Latin and African percussion, as well as rap music, industrial music, and early 70s rock.

Key's improvisational method for creating Skinny Puppy music was done through what was called "brap", which means "getting together, hooking up electronic instruments, getting high, and recording". His approach to Download differed from Skinny Puppy in that he intended to create a "centre-less musical entity, unanchored by the presence of a frontman" and explore the more experimental characteristics of his previous work. He said "I don't think I strive to be unsettling. I think that that's simply what attracts me to make the sound and hopefully achieve the result that will make that journey interesting for me". He told Chart magazine in 1998 that he considered acts such as The Prodigy, Aphex Twin, and Basic Channel to be at the forefront of the electronica scene.

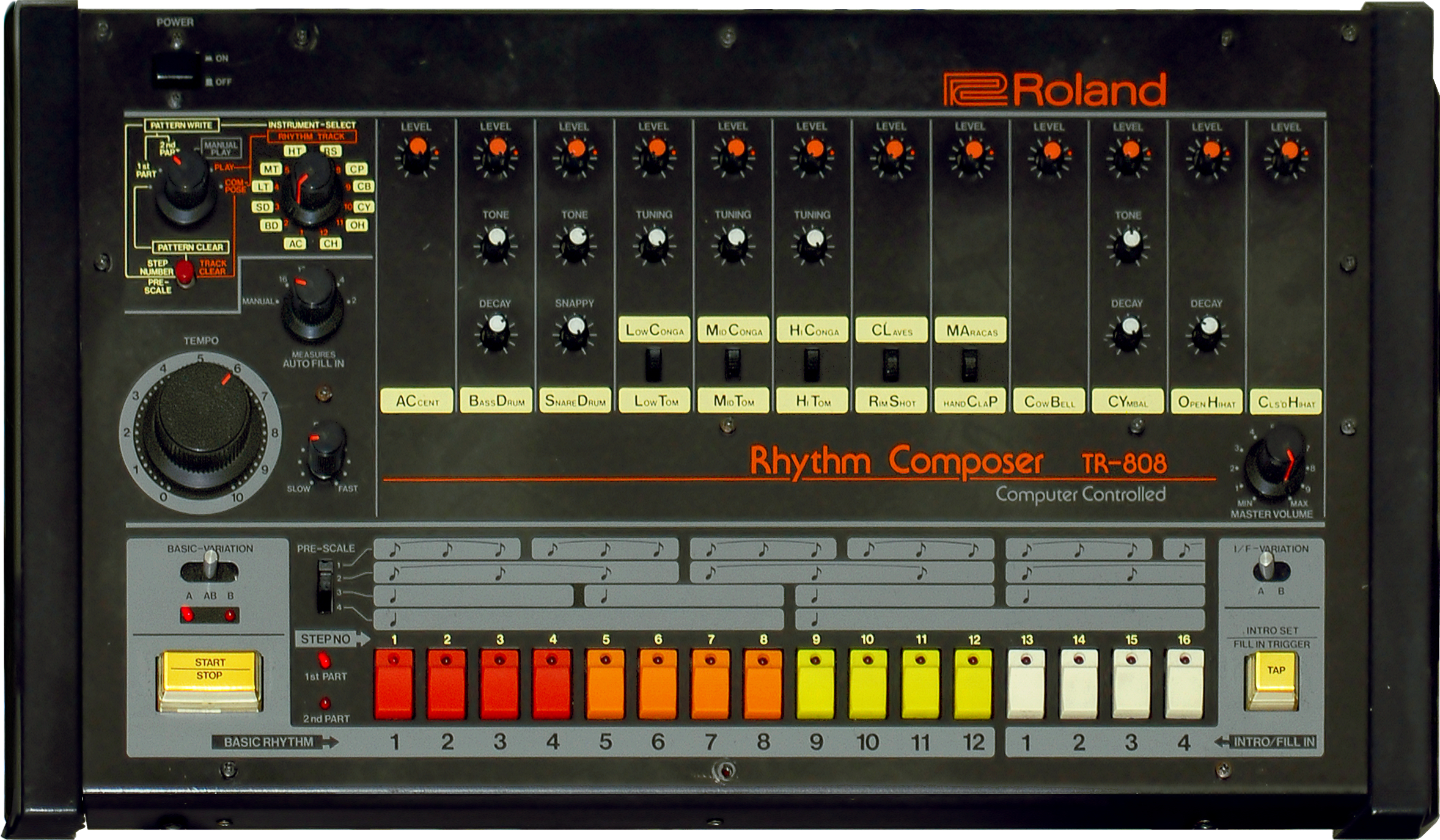
The Roland TR-808 was an integral part of Key's original Skinny Puppy rig

Key mentioned that the intention behind Skinny Puppy's music was to create something that had its own unique and original sound, set apart from groups such as Nitzer Ebb, which he considered "all beat and no music, with lyrics that don't capture what Ogre does". In a 1990 interview with The Pittsburgh Press, Key was apprehensive in classifying his music as industrial, saying that the success of Ministry and Nine Inch Nails had caused the scene to lose sight of its original goal and identity:

[The scene started as] a cool artsy kind of thing and it's sort of grown into something more mainstream ... They're just doing what they can to get themselves in the position of being seen as cool ... For me to say that it shouldn't exist would be censorship and would be completely everything I'm against. But be sure there are people trying to use this as a step ladder to crotch-rock riviera.

Key considered the Lexicon PCM 41 delay to be an essential piece of equipment for his early music, and said that he didn't believe "any of our music could be in existence without a digital delay". He made frequent use of instruments such as the Roland TR-808 and Roland TR-909 drum machines, which proved central to his original setup for Skinny Puppy, and the ARP 2600. His first experience with modular synthesizers was when a member of Psychic TV brought in a Serge panel for the recording of The Process. For live performances, he uses a Moog synthesizer, Roland V-Synth, Ashun Sound Machines Hydrasynth, Teenage Engineering OP-1, and an array of analog effects triggers such as a Pearl Syncussion SY-1.

== Personal life ==
Key considers himself a pacifist and is a supporter of animal rights. He made a dedication to cats on his 1998 solo album Music for Cats, claiming they played a major role in his upbringing, noting "I'm a cat lover, and cats have basically been keeping me my whole life". His affection for cats came from his mother, who was a cat trainer and breeder. He stopped using hard drugs in 1994 and supports the decriminalization of marijuana. In a 1998 interview with Chart magazine, he said his choice to stay away from drugs had been a relatively easy decision in light of Goettel's death.

Key endured several injuries while performing a stunt on the set of Gregg Araki's The Doom Generation. According to Ogre, Key fell from the top of a car, landing face first on the pavement. He suffered a broken kneecap, and required 31 stitches, eight of which were on his face.

In 2016, Key had reconstructive surgery on his nose and face following the removal of a basal-cell carcinoma. He said in a Facebook update that the cancer had started in his nose before spreading up to his eye and down to his lip. He had a similar surgery 15 years before which left a large scar on his nose.

== Discography ==
with Skinny Puppy

- Remission (1984)
- Bites (1985)
- Mind: The Perpetual Intercourse (1986)
- Cleanse Fold and Manipulate (1987)
- VIVIsectVI (1988)
- Rabies (1989)
- Too Dark Park (1990)
- Last Rights (1992)
- The Process (1996)
- The Greater Wrong of the Right (2004)
- Mythmaker (2007)
- HanDover (2011)
- Weapon (2013)

with Download

- Furnace
- Microscopic
- Charlie's Family
- Sidewinder
- The Eyes of Stanley Pain
- III
- Effector
- Inception
- III Steps Forward
- Fixer
- HElicopTEr
- LingAM
- Unknown Room

with platEAU

- Music For Grass Bars
- Spacecake
- Iceolator
- Kushbush
- Gort Spacebar

with The Tear Garden

- Tired Eyes Slowly Burning (1987)
- The Last Man to Fly (1992)
- To Be An Angel Blind, The Crippled Soul Divide (1996)
- Crystal Mass (2000)
- The Secret Experiment (2007)
- Have a Nice Trip (2009)
- The Brown Acid Caveat (2017)
- Astral Elevator (2025)

with Images in Vogue

- In the House

with Doubting Thomas (Canadian band)

- The Infidel

with Hilt

- The Flu, 1987, EP (as the Flu)
- Patsy: A Collection Of Absolute Insanity, 1988, LP (as the Flu)
- Call the Ambulance (Before I Hurt Myself), 1989, LP
- Orange Pony, 1991, EP
- Journey to the Center Of the Bowl, 1991, LP
- The Worst Of the Flu, 2003, LP
- Minoot Bowl Dropped the Ball, 2007, LP

with Cyberaktif

- Tenebrae Vision (1991)
- eNdgame (2023)

with Twilight Circus

- DUBCON - UFO Pon Di Gullyside, 2013, LP

Solo

- Music for Cats (1998)
- The Ghost of Each Room (2001)
- The Dragon Experience (2003, with Ken Marshall)
- Brap and Forth Vol. 8 (2018)
- Resonance [formerly X̱wáýx̱way] (2021)
- bRap and fOrth, vol. 9 (2023)
