= Notes from Thee Underground =

Studio album by Pigface
- Released: May 17, 1994
- Recorded: Two Guys from the Valley, Estudio Parades, Chicago Trax, Warzone, the Stairwell at Invisible Records
- Genre: Industrial
- Length: 48:37
- Label: Invisible
- Producer: Martin Atkins

Pigface chronology
Truth Will Out (1993)	Notes from Thee Underground (1994)	Feels Like Heaven (1995)

Notes from Thee Underground is a 1994 album by Pigface. The following album Feels Like Heaven is a remix EP of this one.

== Releases ==
- Invisible/Devotion CDDVN 29 - CD

== Track listing ==
No.	Title	Music	Length
1.	"Asphole"	Ogilvie, Atkins, Levi, Marcus	5:32
2.	"Divebomber"	Flea, Atkins, Rankine, Weiss	4:07
3.	"Your Own You Own"	P-Orridge, Ogilvie, Atkins, Joyce, Levi	4:00
4.	"Fuck It Up"	Atkins, Flanigan, Weiss	4:05
5.	"Hag-Seed"	Walk, Atkins, P-Orridge	3:28
6.	"Chikasaw"	Atkins, Ferguson, Walk, Rankine, Gira	5:35
7.	"Empathy"	Atkins, Gira, Ferguson, Svitek, Kizys	4:01
8.	"Magazine"	Atkins, Ferguson, Kizys, Svitek, Nicholls, Ruchoft	2:01
9.	"Think"	Atkins, Ferguson, Kizys, Svitek, Flanigan	3:38
10.	"Trivial Scene"	Atkins, Kizys, Marcus	2:58
11.	"Slut/Blood/Pain - The Attempted Restraint Of The Cosmos"	Atkins, Denison, Nicholls, Svitek	2:37
12.	"Psalm Springs Eternal"	Atkins, Walk	1:06
13.	"Steamroller"	Svitek, Marcus, Kizys, Atkins, Ferguson	2:26
14.	"Your Music Is Garbage"	Atkins	3:03

The song "Chikasaw" later appeared in a different version on the 1995 Ruby album Salt Peter with the title "Carondelet".

== Personnel ==
- Patti Adachi – taiko drumming on 1
- Martin Atkins – production, editing, mastering, mixing on 2–4, 6–11, 13, drums, triggered percussion on 1, clavinet on 1, huge drum thing on 1, vocals on 12, background vocals on 1, 4, 5, chorus vocals on 1, tapes on 2, ambient tapes on 5, record and tape scratching on 3, 4, 9, 11, Naga Baba trumpet on 3, hi hat on 7, 1/4" loops on 9, 11, phone call on 10, timbales radio on 11, artwork, collage
- Jello Biafra – "mental illness" on 5
- Scott Crane – engineering assistance on 5, 6
- CVC3 – engineering on 3, 6, 7
- Duane Denison – guitar on 11
- Mike Dillon – drums on 5
- Paul Ferguson – drums on 6–9, 13
- Dirk Flanigan – vocals on 4, 9
- Flea – bass on 2
- Michael Gira – vocals on 7, 12 string guitar on 6
- Laura Gomel – background vocals on 4
- Julian Herzfeld – engineering on 1, 3, 4, 6–9, A-DAT transfer on 2, editing on 4, mixing on 8, 9
- Kenny Jackson – engineering on 1–3
- Sean Joyce – samples on 3, "wanna come get some" vocals on 6, ambient tapes on 5
- Algis Kizys – bass on 7–10, 13
- Charles Levi – vocals on 1, bass on 1, 3, background vocals on 1
- Jim Marcus – package design, taiko drumming on 1, huge drum thing on 1, vocals on 13, background vocals on 1, backing vocal direction on 1, percussion loops on 1, 10, congas on 7
- Jason McNinch – engineering on 11, 13, guitar on 2, PZM microphone operator on 7
- Brad Miller – photography
- Jason More – taiko drumming on 1, huge drum thing on 1
- Michie Nakatami – "fuck it up" sample on 4
- Hope Nicholls – vocals on 8, 11
- Ogre – vocals on 1, 3, chorus vocals on 1
- Jay O'Rourke – editing, mastering
- Genesis P-Orridge – vocals on 3, 5, chorus vocals on 1, Naga Baba trumpet on 3
- Chris Randall – background vocals on 1
- Lesley Rankine – vocals on 2, 6
- Barb Ruchoft – cello on 8
- Louis Svitek – guitar on 3, 7–9, 11, 13
- James Teitelbaum – editing on 9
- Third Function – package design
- Danny Torres – engineering assistance on 1–3
- Dave Trumfio – sitar on 7
- Mark Walk – engineering on 2, 5–8, 12, editing on 6, mixing on 2–4, 6, 7, 11, horns on 5, bass on 5, moog bass on 6, samples on 5, 7, background vocals on 5, piano on 12, orchestra on 12, percussion on 12
- Scott Watanabe – taiko drumming on 1
- Andrew Weiss – bass on 2, 4, keyboards on 4
- Naoko and Atsuko Yamano – "fuck it up" sample on 4
