= Female Werewolf =

- Directed by: Chris Alexander
- Written by: Chris Alexander
- Produced by: Derek Curl
- Starring: Carrie Gemmell; Shauna Henry; Cheryl Singleton
- Cinematography: Chris Alexander
- Edited by: Chris Alexander
- Music by: Chris Alexander
- Production company: Artsploitation Films
- Distributed by: Artsploitation Films
- Release date: October 16, 2015 (Festival de Cine de Sitges)
- Countries: Canada; United States
- Language: English

Female Werewolf is a 2015 independent horror film that was written and directed by Chris Alexander. The film stars Carrie Gemmell as a woman known only as "She", who believes that she is turning into a werewolf. Female Werewolf marks Gemmell’s third film with Alexander, as she had previously appeared in his prior two movies Blood for Irina and Queen of Blood.

== Synopsis ==
The film follows "She" (Carrie Gemmell), an office woman that initially appears to lead a dull life working at an uninspiring office job. At night, however, she has several surreal fantasies involving sex, blood, and a young woman (Cheryl Singleton) she works with at the office. "She" will occasionally wake up in strange places and is convinced that she's turning into a werewolf - something that she believes is evidenced by her teeth elongating.

== Cast ==
- Carrie Gemmell as She
- Shauna Henry
- Cheryl Singleton

== Reception ==
DVD Talk praised Gemmell's performance in Female Werewolf while also stating that the movie would not appeal to all audiences, as it was "a slow moving, deliberate film that is going to appeal to genre nerds of a very specific type, especially those with a soft spot in their hearts for the films of Jean Rollin and Jess Franco." Dread Central made similar comments, also comparing it to Franco while also drawing comparisons to Hélène Cattet and Bruno Forzani.
