= Roman Dirge =

American comic book writer

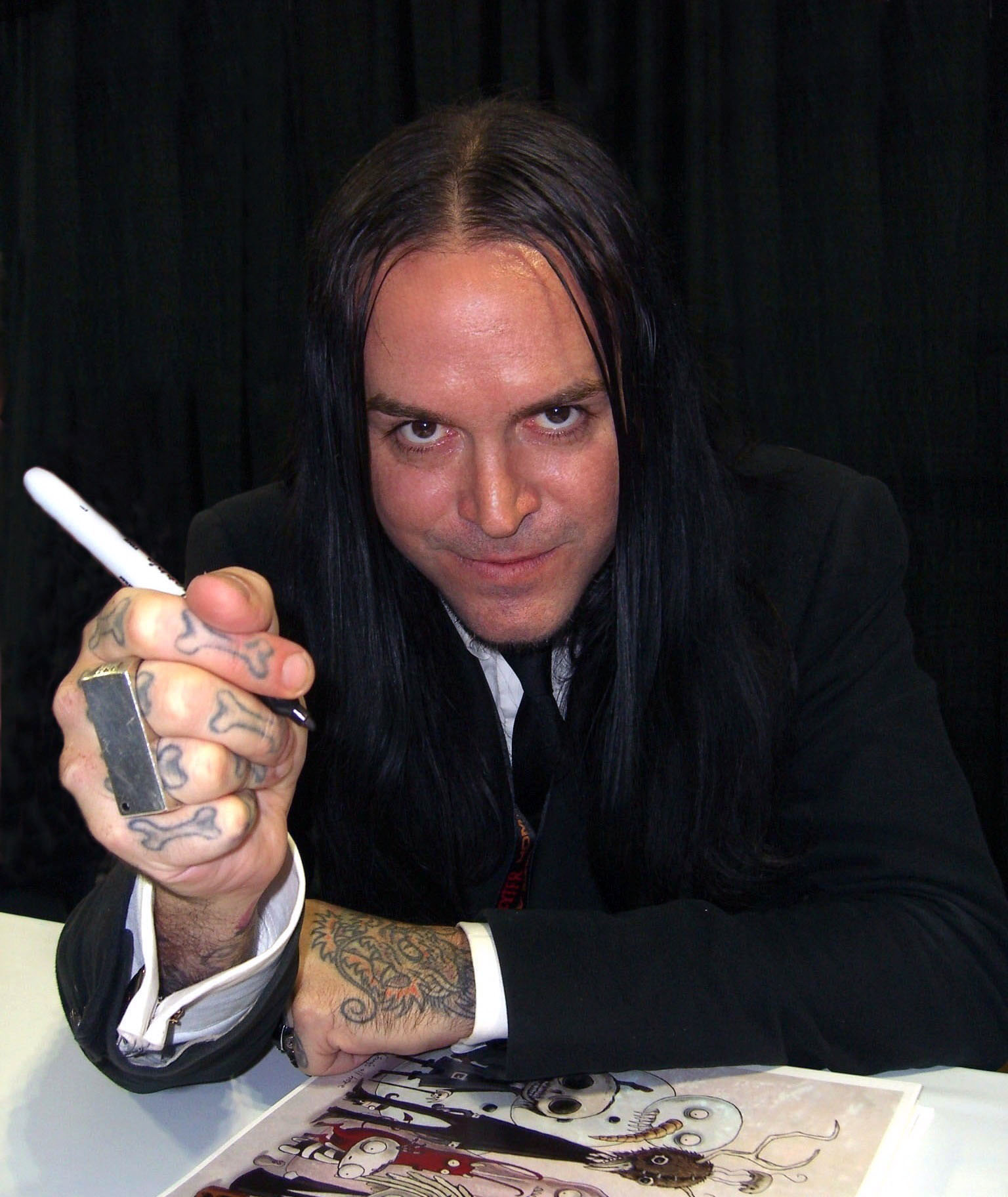
- Dirge at the 2011 New York Comic Con
- Born: Roman Elliot; April 29, 1972 (age 54)
- Areas: Artist and magician

Roman Dirge (born Roman Elliot; April 29, 1972) is an American comic book writer, artist, and former magician. He is best known as the creator of the comic book series Lenore, the Cute Little Dead Girl.

== Career ==
Told by his art teachers that he would never make it as an artist due to his crude style, he quit art and became a full-time magician. After a few years, his passion for art overtook him and he created the comic Lenore, the Cute Little Dead Girl for Xenophobe magazine. The comic strips were later seen by Dan Vado, president of Slave Labor Graphics.

Dirge has also written books such as Something At The Window Is Scratching, The Monsters In My Tummy, The Cat With A Really Big Head: And One Other Story That Isn't As Good and has done work for The Haunted Mansion comics. He has over 75 tattoos.

On February 26, 2013, Dirge and his then girlfriend were injured in a hit-and-run accident in Hollywood, California, while crossing the street. One of Dirge's legs was severely injured and had to be rebuilt with a metal rod, but he was said to be in good spirits despite facing a long recovery.

== Animation ==
26 episodes of a Lenore Animation were created for Sony's website ScreenBlast, these are no longer available on Screenblast, but can now be seen on Dirge's site Spooky Land. Roman Dirge wrote for his friend, and fellow Slave Labor Graphics artist Jhonen Vasquez's Invader ZIM, and on the back of the second Invader ZIM DVD it says "Made with 100% more Dirge" with a picture of him on it, Invader Zim style.

== Music ==
Dirge was in a band during high school named Of Worlds Long Dead.

Dirge provided original art for Scarling's tour posters in 2003.

Dirge provided the cover, booklet and CD art for the 2001 album Welt as well as the cover art for the 2018 album Tricks by ohGr.

== Selected bibliography ==
- Lenore
- Something at the Window is Scratching
- The Monsters in My Tummy
- The Cat With a Really Big Head: And One Other Story That isn't As Good
- Peter The Pirate Squid (writer, art by Steven Daily)
- It Ate Billy On Christmas (writer, artist, paintings by Steven Daily)
- Haunted Mansion (Art covers and stories)
- Lenore: Pink Bellies
