= SunnyPsyOp =

Studio album by ohGr
- Released: July 1, 2003
- Genre: Post-industrial, electro-industrial
- Length: 49:08
- Label: Spitfire
- Producer: Mark Walk; Ogre

OhGr chronology
Welt (2001)	SunnyPsyOp (2003)	Devils in my Details (2008)

Professional ratings
Review scores
Source	Rating
AllMusic	2.5/5 stars

SunnyPsyOp (2003) is the second studio album by industrial band ohGr.

== Track listing ==
All songs written by Ogre and Mark Walk.

No.	Title	Length
1.	"HiLO"	4:56
2.	"maJiK"	3:41
3.	"JaKO"	3:55
4.	"ChemTale"	4:27
5.	"WaTergaTe"	3:29
6.	"DoG"	4:26
7.	"iOvNoW"	7:16
8.	"ShiTe"	3:54
9.	"SunBurn"	4:10
10.	"EnDai"	3:40
11.	"Untitled"	0:04
12.	"Untitled"	0:04
13.	"PawSee"	5:06
Total length:		49:08

Note: "PawSee" is a hidden track that begins 23 seconds into track 13.

This is an Enhanced CD, it includes a video for the song "maJiK".

== Personnel ==
- Ogre
- Mark Walk
- Scott Crane – Additional programming
- Loki der Quaeler – Additional keyboards
- Camille Rose Garcia – Cover artwork

== Notes ==
- An endai is a small bench in a Japanese Garden.
- The video for "maJiK" features stop motion animation and the following phrase written in a book near the beginning of the video: "Very Soon/Forever More/The Way to Be/Will Be Attached/Forever Matched/Through What U See". This is most likely a reference to commercialism's grip on pop culture as the video also features parodies of several popular brand logos including GAP, Nike, General Electric and Starbucks.
