= Nivek Ogre =

Canadian musician, artist and actor

- Ogre at Dragon Con in 2026

Background information
- Also known as: Ogre; ohGr
- Born: Kevin Graham Ogilvie; December 5, 1962 (age 63); Calgary, Alberta, Canada
- Origin: Vancouver, British Columbia, Canada
- Genres: Industrial; electro-industrial; industrial rock; experimental
- Occupations: Vocalist; musician; performance artist; actor
- Instruments: Vocals; keyboards; synthesizers; guitar
- Years active: 1982–present
- Labels: Nettwerk Records; American Recordings; Spitfire Records; SPV GmbH; Metropolis Records
- Website: ohgr.bandcamp.com

Kevin Graham Ogilvie (born December 5, 1962), known professionally as Nivek Ogre, is a Canadian musician, performance artist and actor, best known for his work with the industrial music group Skinny Puppy, which he co-founded with cEvin Key. From 1982 to 1996, and again from 2003 to 2023, he served as Skinny Puppy's primary lyricist and vocalist, occasionally providing instrumentation and samples. Ogre's charismatic personality, guttural vocals and use of costumes, props, and fake blood on stage helped widen Skinny Puppy's fanbase and has inspired numerous other musicians.

In 2001, he formed the electronic music group ohGr along with longtime collaborator Mark Walk. Originally named W.E.L.T., ohGr has released five studio albums since 2001, three of which have placed on Billboard's Dance/Electronic Albums chart. Ogre has also been involved with several other musicians including the Al Jourgensen bands Ministry and Revolting Cocks, Pigface and Rx with Martin Atkins, and KMFDM.

Ogre has on several occasions worked as an actor in low-budget horror films. He appeared as Pavi Largo in the rock opera film Repo! The Genetic Opera, as well as Harper Alexander in the comedy-horror film entitled 2001 Maniacs: Field of Screams. Ogre was reunited with Repo! director Darren Lynn Bousman for the 2012 musical short film The Devil's Carnival and its sequel Alleluia! The Devil's Carnival. In 2014, he starred in the Canadian film Queen of Blood.

== Early life ==
Ogre was born on December 5, 1962, in Calgary, Alberta, Canada. From a young age, he had imagined working in a studio as a singer, believing it was his own "manifest destiny". He was also interested in magic and had attempted to become a magician, joining the International Brotherhood of Magicians. He entertained his parents with magic shows, during which his tricks would often fail humorously. He described his childhood as "introverted", and that he would take refuge in watching monster movies; he also enjoyed the horror fantasy writings of H. P. Lovecraft and Edgar Allan Poe.

As a child, he was fascinated with words and would spend time in his basement writing poetry. He would write several pages at a time and then play around with what he had written. "From that, I developed a keen sense of how words sound, how they can phonetically sound and be changed. How words obviously have different meanings and with a slight displacement can take on almost a surreal meaning". This interest in language and vocabulary stemmed from his love of music and lyrics. His subsequent musical stylings were informed by the likes of Brian Eno, Syd Barrett, and Kraftwerk. He has cited the Cure's Pornography, David Bowie's Scary Monsters (and Super Creeps), and Orchestral Manoeuvres in the Dark's Organisation as pivotal records during his youth. Ogre said that Joy Division's Unknown Pleasures introduced him to "the dark side of music"; he soon found himself gravitating towards musicians such as Throbbing Gristle, Portion Control, and Front 242.

Ogre left Calgary for Vancouver, British Columbia at the age of twenty. "Vancouver has an edge to it; an attitude; an arrogance when it comes to music. I came there as a young 20-year-old from Calgary and entered into a world I’d never seen before". In 1982, he attempted to start a record distribution company using borrowed money, a venture that ultimately failed. He was further troubled by the death of his father and a divorce from his wife. Ogre was roommates with Images in Vogue member Gary Blair Smith when he met cEvin Key (Kevin Crompton), the drummer for Smith's band, at a party. He also met future collaborator Steven Gilmore, whom he learned had also attended Ernest Manning High School in Calgary. Key asked Ogre to join his project, Skinny Puppy, an invitation he accepted. Images in Vogue recording engineer Dave Ogilvie also signed up. The pair adopted stage names to avoid the confusion brought by having two people named Kevin in one group. (cEvin Key and Nivek (Kevin spelled backwards) Ogre)

== Music career ==
=== Skinny Puppy ===
Ogre's work with Skinny Puppy has primarily been as the lead singer, though he would occasionally contribute work with percussion and synthesizers. The first song he wrote for the group was titled "Canine" and helped establish the philosophy of writing songs about the world as seen through a dog's eyes. "It was about a dog watching his master beat his wife and then questioning himself - should he be loyal to the man or rip his head off?" Along with Bill Leeb (Wilhelm Shroeder), Ogre and Key produced the EP Remission in 1984 and released it through the newly established Nettwerk label. Next to follow were two full-length albums, Bites in 1985 and Mind: The Perpetual Intercourse in 1986, the latter of which spawned their first single, "Dig It".

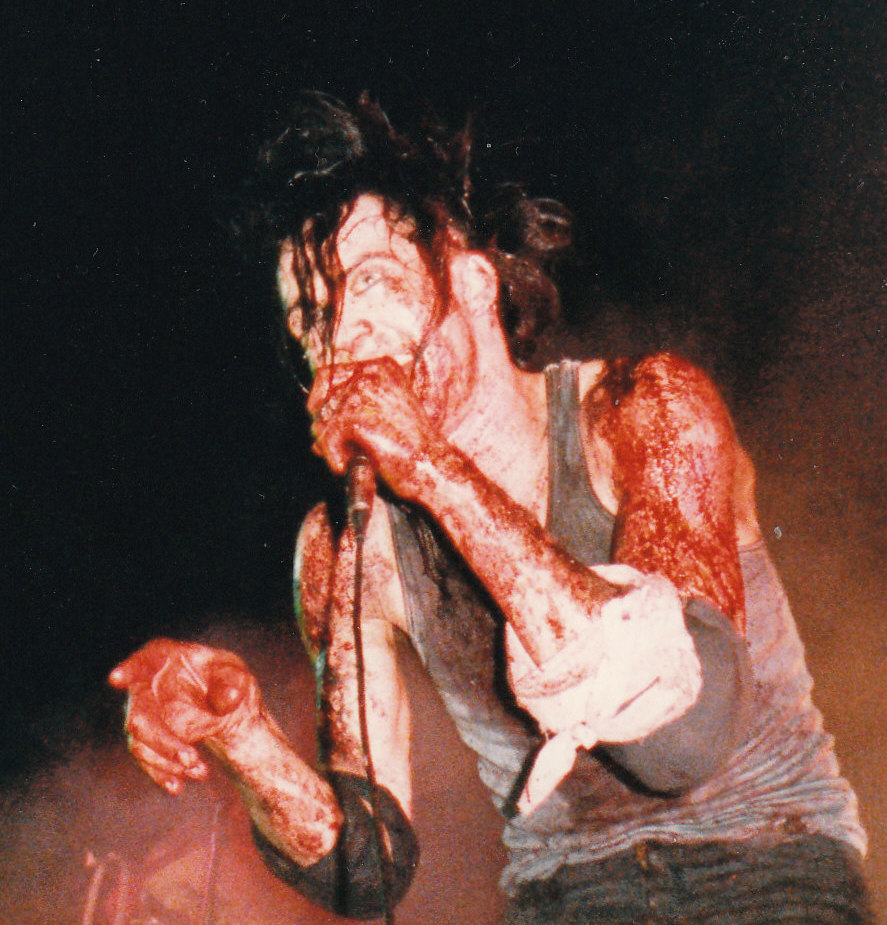
Nivek Ogre performing with Skinny Puppy in 1987

Many of Ogre's early songs, specifically from the album Bites, were about his ex-wife. Following Bites, Ogre began to construct more politically and socially minded lyrics such as those for the song "Dig It", which he says describes "a fight to rise above in the work force/ which can turn into your early grave". Ogre's writing would gradually become more "worldly" and "ecology-minded". Animal rights and environmental degradation would become recurring elements in Skinny Puppy's music. 1988's VIVIsectVI, written as "a biting commentary on animal rights", spawned the single "Testure" which peaked at no. 19 on Billboard's Dance Club Songs chart.

Skinny Puppy became known for their performance art laden live shows, a result of Ogre's use of costumes, props, and fake blood. The set design for a live show often falls to Ogre, who usually builds the sets himself. Ogre described the Too Dark Park tour as his career high point, during which he ran off what he called "car-crash energy".

While recording the Skinny Puppy album The Process in Los Angeles, a split began to grow between the band members with Ogre on one side and the other two band members, Key and keyboardist Dwayne Goettel, on the other. In 1994, Skinny Puppy completed the master tapes for the album. Key and Goettel returned to Vancouver with the tapes while Ogre decided to stay in Los Angeles. Ogre quit Skinny Puppy in June 1995, two months before Goettel died from a heroin overdose.

He joined the Banff Centre as an artist-in-residence in spring 2000 before reuniting with Key to perform at the Doomsday Festival in Dresden as Skinny Puppy. Relations improved between the two band members after the performance and they released The Greater Wrong of the Right in 2004; they followed this up with the release of Mythmaker in 2007 and hanDover in 2011. In 2013, inspired by the news that their music had been used for torture at Guantanamo Bay detention camp, they released the album Weapon. In early 2014, Ogre and Key sent the US government an invoice for $666,000 for the use of their music at the camp. Ogre told the San Francisco Examiner that "they didn’t even use our actual recordings – they used bootlegs, so there was all sorts of hiss and distortion in the mix, which was probably even more disturbing to the person who was having it done to them". In 2015, they embarked on the Down the Sociopath tour with Youth Code through North America. A follow-up tour in Europe entitled Down the Sociopath too Euro 2017 began in May 2017.

=== ohGr ===
In 1989, Ogre and Al Jourgensen started the side project W.E.L.T. (When Everyone Learns the Truth). Some material was recorded, but the only song they released was turned into Ministry's 1996 song "The Fall", from Filth Pig. During the recording of The Process in Malibu, Ogre befriended Ruby member Mark Walk. They revived the W.E.L.T. project by producing a 14-track album, but this was eventually shelved by their label, American Recordings. Ogre became depressed as a result of the labels decision; he told Exclaim! in 1998 that to relieve the situation, he picked up a book on Pink Floyd and started playing the guitar. "That was really good for me, it was really good therapy. It took hours and hours of time that would have been spent fixating on a problem that there was really nothing I could do about".

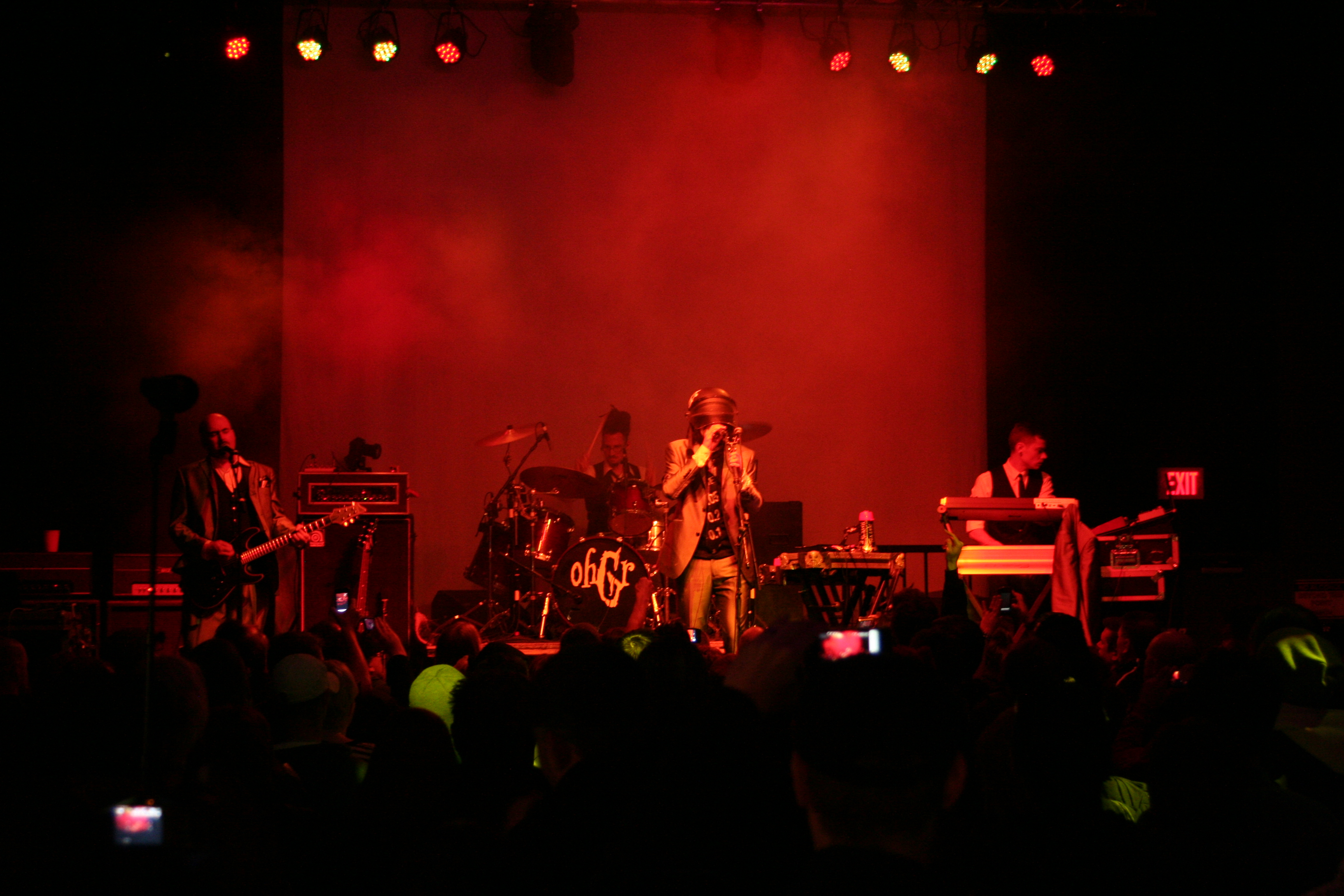
Nivek Ogre on stage with ohGr in 2011

Ogre was kept on the label for three years, unable to do anything with the recordings. "It wasn’t until about 2000 that I pulled myself up by the bootstraps and went to see what was going on. I found out that all that time, I could have just walked away from it because no one was going to do anything". Ogre and Walk landed a deal with Spitfire Records, but were unable to retrieve their original master recordings from American. This meant they had to rerecord the entire album, a feat which took them roughly three to four months. Using the new moniker ohGr, the album was released as Welt in February 2001. A video for the song "Cracker" was produced by Skinny Puppy collaborator William Morrison, who would join the group on tour. Also joining the tour was cEvin Key, who performed drums.

ohGr would produce three more albums including SunnyPsyOp in 2003, Devils in my Details in 2008, UnDeveloped in 2011, all of which landed on Billboard's Dance/Electronic Albums chart. "What makes ohGr different from Skinny Puppy", Ogre explained to Westword in 2011, "is that Skinny Puppy focuses on sound design with lyrics laid on top, while ohGr bases its music around lyrics". He stated further: "When we're performing live, with ohGr, we strip back a lot of the electronics and the stuff that doesn't need to be there...All the guitars out, all the bass out, when it's played live, and a lot of the keyboards are played live, too".

ohGr released their fifth album, Tricks, on June 18, 2018. The album was funded by a PledgeMusic campaign. The album had been intended for release on October 31, 2017, but the release date was pushed back due to a mastering error. The band promoted the album with a 32 date North American tour and included three dates for the 2018 Cold Waves festival, which they had performed in the year prior while supporting KMFDM. The tour was the first time in 25 years Ogre performed in his hometown of Calgary. The band was supported by Paul Barker's Lead into Gold and Omniflux.

In January 2019, amid similar stories from other bands, Walk told Billboard that PledgeMusic had owed the band $100,000 in funds raised during the campaign. The company had been unresponsive with regards to when the band would be paid, which had forced them to release the album digitally and tour without merchandise to sell.

=== Collaborations with Al Jourgensen ===
Ogre's first collaboration with Al Jourgensen was in 1987 during the recording of the song "Show Me Your Spine" for the film RoboCop. The song was recorded by PTP, a side project of Jourgensen's alongside Ministry cohort Paul Barker. Jourgensen explained that he "didn't even know who he [Ogre] was, but somebody said he was some singer from somewhere, so I just said "hey man, make yourself useful, get in here and sing". Ogre would later go on tour with Ministry to promote their album The Land of Rape and Honey in 1988. Ogre asked Jourgensen if he would produce the 1989 Skinny Puppy album Rabies, a job he accepted. Jourgensen described his experience with Skinny Puppy as tumultuous since it had been Ogre, not Key and Goettel, who asked for assistance on the record; "Sometimes bad vibes make for great, tension-filled music, and that's what Skinny Puppy thrived on".

Ogre next worked with Jourgensen on the Ministry album The Mind Is a Terrible Thing to Taste, receiving credit as a writer on the song "Thieves". Ogre introduced Jourgensen to Toronto native Angelina Lukacin whose voice was recorded for the album closer "Dream Song". Ogre joined Ministry on tour contributing guitars, keyboards, and vocals. He said that "Playing with Ministry was insane everywhere, especially during the tour for The Mind Is a Terrible Thing to Taste, which had the cage set up at the front of the stage. It became all you saw, the cage separating you from the raging mass of people in front of you". The single "Burning Inside" featured a live cover of the Skinny Puppy song "Smothered Hope", with Ogre contributing vocals.

Ogre had also worked with Jourgensen in the industrial group Revolting Cocks, originally as a touring member. Ogre mentioned that he "had a gas" while on tour, referring to it as an initiation; "My brain was rotating about four feet above my head". He continued to work with the group by providing vocals for their 1990 effort Beers, Steers, and Queers. When Ogre was again invited to tour with the band, he declined, explaining that his friendship with Jourgensen had become strained. "There were a few things that happened between me and him [Jourgensen] that really made me question our whole friendship and his reason for having me down there. So I decided to bow out of the Revolting Cocks tour. If I hadn't, I would have come back totally addicted to heroin".

=== Other musical ventures ===
Ogre became involved with Pigface, an industrial music collective formed by Martin Atkins, on their 1990 debut Gub. He sang on the song "Tapeworm" and was featured on the 1991 live album Welcome to Mexico... Asshole. Ogre also contributed to the studio albums Fook (1992) and Notes from Thee Underground (1994), and the live album Truth Will Out (1993) as a guitarist. Ogre again teamed up with Atkins to form the band Ritalin, later renamed Rx. The duo's only release, 1998's Bedside Toxicology, provided a showcase for Ogre's singing, something which he had worked on while spending time in Seattle. Ogre also made several contributions to KMFDM, providing vocals for the song "Torture" on their 1997 album Symbols. He joined the band as a guest musician for their Symbols tour. He said of his experience: "There was a really great vibe on that tour and I really got along with all the people and it gave me a chance to laugh maniacally". He worked with KMFDM again in 1999, singing on the songs "That's All" and "Full Worm Garden" for the album Adios.

Ogre appeared on The Final Cut's 1991 debut album, Consumed, alongside Chris Connelly, and provided Monster Voodoo Machine a remix of the song "Copper Theft" on their 1994 album Defense Mechanism. Ogre worked with Mark Walk on several tracks for the 1996 video game Descent II and later on a remix of "Smothered Hope" for the album Remix dystemper in 1998. The pair also provided a remix of the song "Edge of the World" by The Crüxshadows on their release Shadowbox. He covered the song "Borderline" by Madonna for the album Virgin Voices 2000: A Tribute to Madonna and appeared on cEvin Key's 2001 solo album, The Ghost of Each Room. Ogre supplied a remix of the track "Wraith" for John Carpenter's 2014 album Lost Themes and also contributed to the 2015 Demons (1985 film) remix album.

== Style ==
=== Vocals and lyrics ===
Described by Bill Henderson of The Orlando Sentinel as "disturbing, distorted and disconnected from anything real", Ogre's vocal style took influence from the likes of Stephen Mallinder of Cabaret Voltaire and Ian Sharp of Portion Control, and has in turn influenced a number of subsequent artists. "If I can do it and can emote, then anyone has a chance. And you don’t need to be a vocal acrobat to get an emotion across". He started off his career as a "non-singer", with his vocals often heavily treated with effects. His guttural and oftentimes unintelligible delivery became a hallmark of Skinny Puppy's music. His lyrics, usually delivered as a stream of consciousness meant to invoke certain images to the listener, range from surrealistic to overtly sociopolitical, and explore topics such as vivisection, war, disease, the environment, addiction, and self-determination. The meaning behind his lyrics is often obscured by the cacophony of music surrounding them. "We're more into creating moods, and within them there's a lot more freedom for people to make up their minds and apply the lyrics to themselves and different situations". When asked if he was bothered by people misinterpreting his lyrics, he replied "art is for interpretation, and interpretation can take on whatever form it wants".

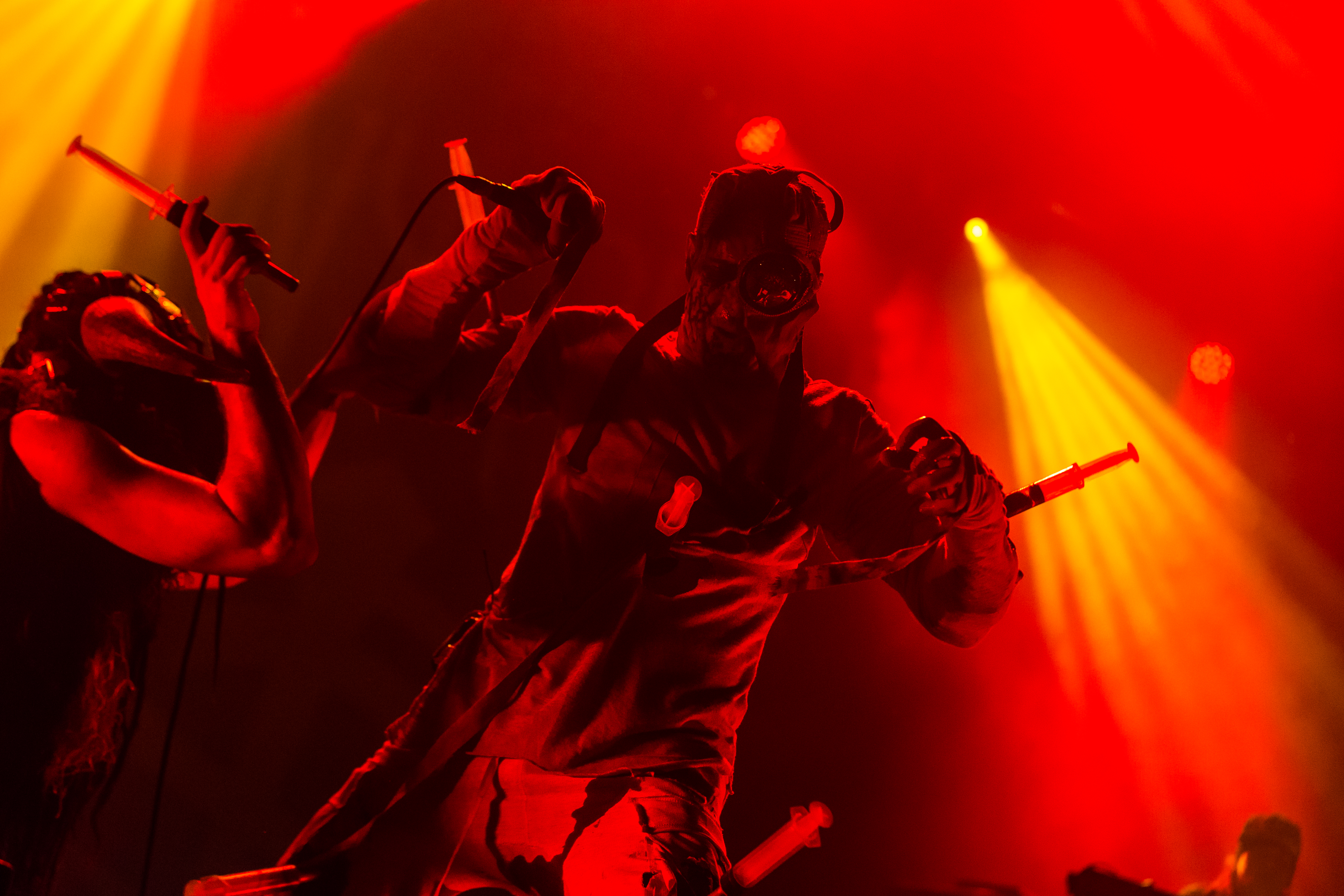
Ogre (right) performing onstage at Wave-Gotik-Treffen, 2017

In the mid 90s, fearing that after years of strain he was beginning to lose his voice, he started receiving vocal training and implemented various exercises to save it. For the W.E.L.T. project, producer Mark Walk encouraged Ogre to sing without vocal effects, a prospect which initially terrified Ogre, who said the effects were like a protective shield. To boost his confidence, he spent eight months working with his voice to test its capabilities. He later said that singing without treated vocals allowed him to express himself in ways he'd never been able to with Skinny Puppy. He continued this method with Bedside Toxicology, during the production of which he said he learned that not only could he compose music, but he could also harmonize with his voice. "I have more control over harmonies. In these incremental ways you like grow as an artist, hopefully".

=== Live performances ===
Ogre's live performances have been referred to as performance art, and are influenced by his interest in the horror films, the work of Alice Cooper, and his childhood love of magic tricks. The Los Angeles Times attributed Ogre's theatrics to him becoming "the first industrial rock star". On stage, he employs a wide range of props and costumes, and uses liberal amounts of fake blood despite an allergy to red food dye. He considered the Too Dark Park tour to be a career high point and one of his favorites, and included several large set pieces, one of which, the stilt-man, involved Ogre walking on stilts while operating a pair of hydraulic crutches as he lurched towards the audience. When asked if he felt Marilyn Manson had stolen parts of his old stage show for himself, Ogre insisted that Manson had only ever used the stilt-man character, incorporating it into his own show.

Despite his work being labeled shock rock, he says that his performances are meant to get the audience to think and see different viewpoints rather than simply gross them out. He toned down the use of props for his performances with ohGr, wanting the shows to instead focus on music. He clarified his stance while touring in support of Devils in My Details: "For me, ohGr is not a way to reinvent the wheel but to be open to anything. So it doesn't mean, necessarily, that there's going to be a lot of flash on this tour, because that's more of a Skinny Puppy trademark". He told the San Francisco Examiner that he had disliked his early work with Skinny Puppy, saying that he thought of himself as a "ham-fisted hack". It wasn't until he revisited old concert footage that he changed his mind. "I recently watched a concert video of me cutting a smile into my face during 'Assimilate', and I was creating tension even though I didn't know I was doing it. It all came from my love of magic".

== Acting career ==
Ogre's first attempt at acting came in the form of an audition for the role of Funboy in The Crow, an experience which he described as being dreadful. "That's where for the first time I really hit that wall of 'whoa, this is very different than being on stage'. The read was with [the] male assistant director who was playing the female opposite me in a kind of sexy situation [...] I just lost my shit trying to make this work and thought, 'this isn’t for me'". Skinny Puppy were to appear on the soundtrack with the song "Outafter" (which later appeared on the Download album The Eyes of Stanley Pain). However, Ogre nixed the idea as he felt the song sounded too "techno-y"; he later regretted this decision when he found out the film's star Brandon Lee liked the song.

Ogre's first experience acting was alongside his Skinny Puppy cohorts in the film The Doom Generation. The film's director Gregg Araki, a Skinny Puppy fan, invited the band to play as a group of goons who attack a car. cEvin Key sustained several injuries from falling off the car; "[He] landed right on his face. Literally faceplanted into cement". Ogre later stated that, "I don't think we ever heard back from Gregg Araki after that, unfortunately. He's a great director, and it wasn't anything weird between us and him; it was just an odd thing that happened".

Ogre returned to the screen in the 2008 Darren Lynn Bousman film Repo! The Genetic Opera as Pavi, a frequent partier who wears a mask of flesh. The film was released in 11 theaters worldwide and received mostly negative reviews from critics. Ogre responded to the criticism, telling Arielle Castillo of the Miami New Times, "I'm not saying it's not without problems, it was a low-budget film [...] There are a few things like editing and connecting things, but it still works, it's still got a lot of heart". Ogre later appeared as Harper Alexander in the Tim Sullivan film 2001 Maniacs: Field of Screams, replacing Giuseppe Andrew who had played the character in the film's 2005 predecessor.

Ogre reunited with Bousman for the 2012 horror musical short The Devil's Carnival and its accompanying road tour as The Twin. He returned for the full-length feature sequel, 2015's Alleluia! The Devil's Carnival. In 2014, he starred in Scream Park alongside Doug Bradley. In the film, he plays psychotic killer Iggy, who, alongside his partner Ogre (played by Ian Lemmon), hunt down crew members of a decommissioning amusement park. He also appeared in the 2014 film Queen of Blood, the spiritual successor to director Chris Alexander's debut film. Ogre was also featured in the 2016 documentary Diary of a Dead Beat, which follows the career of filmmaker Jim Van Bebber.

== Personal life ==
Ogre is known for being a supporter of animal rights, often condemning animal testing as being "pointless". He has more specifically explained his grievances with cases such as monkeys faces being crushed in laboratories to test car crash physics models or vivisections performed on dogs. He explained his viewpoint in a 2000 interview with Zillo magazine: "No human being would want to endure that kind of torture. Who would want to be locked up in some sterile laboratory? I love animals more than anything." This stance culminated in the 1988 Skinny Puppy album VIVIsectVI and its accompanying stage show, which featured re-enactments of animal experiments with a prop dog. These recreations were so provocative that the band was arrested and fined for being a nuisance to the public. In addition, he opposes factory farming and was a vegetarian for fourteen years, but abandoned the diet citing health problems.

In the period between the production of the albums VIVIsectVI and Last Rights, Ogre struggled with substance abuse. His addiction to drugs, coupled with his preference for working with Al Jourgensen, led to him often being the odd one out. Ogre was admitted into hospital while touring with Pigface in Sweden. While there he learned he had contracted hepatitis A, and later went to seek treatment from a rehab center in Edmonton. Reflecting on the turbulent production of 1996's The Process, Ogre said: "We all had drug problems but didn't know it from each other [...] I was in Los Angeles getting clean while the others were doing drugs in Vancouver." Ogre remains a supporter for the legalization of marijuana.

Writer Jolene Siana had sent Ogre numerous letters over a span of three years during the 1980s. Following a chance meeting with Siana a decade later, Ogre returned these letters, which he had stored away in a box. Siana then compiled the letters and published them in the book Go Ask Ogre: Letters From a Deathrock Cutter in 2005.

== Discography ==
Skinny Puppy

- Remission (1984)
- Bites (1985)
- Mind: The Perpetual Intercourse (1986)
- Cleanse Fold and Manipulate (1987)
- VIVIsectVI (1988)
- Rabies (1989)
- Too Dark Park (1990)
- Last Rights (1992)
- The Process (1996)
- The Greater Wrong of the Right (2004)
- Mythmaker (2007)
- HanDover (2011)
- Weapon (2013)

ohGr

- Welt (2001)
- SunnyPsyOp (2003)
- Devils in my Details (2008)
- UnDeveloped (2011)
- Tricks (2018)

== Filmography ==
Year	Title	Role	Notes
1995	The Doom Generation	Goon	Uncredited; alongside cEvin Key and Dwayne Goettel
2008	Repo! The Genetic Opera	Pavi Largo	Credited as Ogre
2010	2001 Maniacs: Field of Screams	Harper Alexander	
2011	Fix: The Ministry Movie	Himself	Ministry documentary
2011	The Key to Annabel Lee	The Narrator	Short film
2012	The Devil's Carnival	The Twin	Short film
2013	Scream Park	Iggy	
2014	Queen of Blood	Preacher	
2015	Alleluia! The Devil's Carnival	The Twin	
2016	Diary of a Dead Beat	Himself	Documentary film
2016-2017	Teen Wolf	Ghost Rider	Television series
2020	Evil	Ghoul Orderly #2	Television series
