= Tormentor (song) =

Song by Skinny Puppy

Single by Skinny Puppy

from the album Too Dark Park
- Released: 1990
- Genre: Electro-industrial
- Length: 17:27
- Label: Nettwerk; Capitol Records
- Songwriter(s): Ogre/Key/Goettel
- Producer(s): Dave Ogilvie; cEvin Key

Skinny Puppy singles chronology
"Worlock" (1990)	"Tormentor" (1990)	"Spasmolytic" (1991)

Audio sample
- file; help

Professional ratings
Review scores
Source	Rating
AllMusic	3/5 stars

"Tormentor" is a single by the band Skinny Puppy. It is the first single from their album Too Dark Park, released in 1990.

== Track listing ==
No.	Title	Length
1.	"Tormentor" (Ext. Re Edit)	7:38
2.	"Bark"	4:40
3.	"Nature's Revenge" (Dub)	5:09
Total length:		17:27

== Personnel ==
All credits adapted from liner notes.

Skinny Puppy

- Nivek Ogre – vocals
- cEvin Key – synthesizers, programming, engineering, production, mixing
- Dwayne Goettel – synthesizers, programming, engineering, production, mixing

Additional personnel

- Dave Ogilvie – production, mixing
- Ken Marshall – recording, mixing
- Greg Reely – mixing (1)
- Chris Sheppard – editing
- Anthony Valcic – editing
- Jim Cummins – artwork
