= W.E.L.T. =

W.E.L.T. was a briefly extant side project between members of industrial bands Skinny Puppy (Nivek Ogre) and Ministry (Al Jourgensen and Michael Balch). The project was active for a short while in 1989.

"Noreen" is the only W.E.L.T. song to have ever surfaced. Various elements of the song were subsequently incorporated into the song "The Fall" which appears on Ministry's album Filth Pig.

W.E.L.T. "Noreen" (1995)
29 second sample from W.E.L.T.s "Noreen".

The track "Noreen" appears on a Skinny Puppy bootleg compilation album Ain't Enough Damn Puppy released in 1995 in cassette format only. The track is not listed on the cover but does appear as a song on the cassette itself and is also listed on the cassette shell. The track is currently still available for purchase from certain Russian 'legal' MP3 download sites, despite the track being officially unreleased.

In 2001, Nivek Ogre reformed W.E.L.T. project under the new name ohGr, and under this name the band has released further material.
