= UnDeveloped =

unDeveloped

Studio album by ohGr
- Released: May 10, 2011
- Genre: Electronic, electro-industrial, industrial rock
- Length: 52:57
- Label: Metropolis - (U.S.A.); Synthetic Symphony - (Germany)

OhGr chronology
Devils in my Details (2008)	unDeveloped (2011)	Tricks (2018)

Professional ratings
Review scores
Source	Rating
ReGen Magazine	4/5 stars

unDeveloped is the fourth studio album by electro-industrial band ohGr.

== Track listing ==
From Metropolis Records

No.	Title	Length
1.	"101 (Intro)"	1:11
2.	"101"	4:36
3.	"Crash (Intro)"	1:47
4.	"Crash"	3:29
5.	"Pissage"	3:47
6.	"Comedown"	4:47
7.	"Typer"	4:10
8.	"screwMe"	4:09
9.	"Bellew"	4:19
10.	"Hollow"	3:29
11.	"traGek"	3:47
12.	"Animist"	3:33
13.	"Nitwitz"	9:54
Total length:		52:57

== Personnel ==
From unDeveloped liner notes

- Ogre - vocals, instrumentals
- Mark Walk - instrumentals, production
- Ken Marshall - additional mixings, writing, mastering and production
- Steven R. Gilmore - sleeve design

== Notes ==
- Track 13 includes the song "Welcome to Collidoskope" as a hidden track. "Welcome to Collidoskope" begins at the 4:58 mark.
- "Crash (Intro)" and "Crash", tracks 3 and 4 respectively, include the actual audio from the 911 call reporting Michael Jackson's death.
