= Adrienne Pierce =

Canadian musician

- Born: West Vancouver, British Columbia; Canada
- Occupation: Musician

Adrienne Pierce (born 1977), is a Canadian singer from West Vancouver. She has released several albums and EPs. Her songs were featured in Grey's Anatomy, and on Veronica Mars and was released on the original soundtrack for the series. She has also had songs on The Hills, The L Word, The Chris Isaak Show, Army Wives, Greek and Dirt. She is married to fellow musician/songwriter Ari Shine and lives in Los Angeles.

Her second album, Faultline, was released in 2007, her third, Oh Deer in 2010, and her fourth, My Heavens in 2013. In 2015, she and Ari Shine released an eponymous album of their new duo, The Royal Oui.

== Discography ==
=== Albums ===
- Small Fires (2004)
- Faultline (2007)
- Oh Deer (2010)
- My Heavens (2013)
- The Royal Oui (2014) (as part of The Royal Oui)
- This is Someday (2018) (as part The Royal Oui)

=== EPs and Singles ===
- Hors d'Oeuvres EP (2006)
- Exit (2006)
- Making Angels (2006)
- Winter (2008)
- Spring (2009)
- Fall (2011)
- Summer (2011)
- Animals (2021) (as part of The Royal Oui)

=== Compilations ===
- "Lost and Found" on the Veronica Mars: Original Television Soundtrack
- "Pocahontas" on Broken Tunes 2 (covers of Neil Young songs, proceeds go the charity). Sirius/Universal
- "Reaching For Me" on MPress Records New Arrivals 3, 2008

=== Music Videos ===
- Arizona (directed by William Morrison 2003)
- Museum (directed by Allison Beda 2010)
- Arc De Triomphe (directed by Allison Beda 2012)
- All About You (directed by Allison Beda 2017)
