= Tricks (album) =

Studio album by ohGr
- Released: June 18, 2018 (digital)
- Genre: Electro-industrial; synthpop
- Length: 45:43
- Producer: Mark Walk

OhGr chronology
UnDeveloped (2011)	Tricks (2018)

Tricks (stylized as TrickS) is the fifth studio album by electro-industrial band ohGr. The album was funded via a PledgeMusic campaign and was released on June 18, 2018, after a number of delays. The band raised $20,000 within a few days of announcing their campaign. The band embarked on a North American tour alongside Paul Barker's Lead into Gold and Omniflux.

In January 2019, producer Mark Walk told Billboard that PledgeMusic had owed the band $100,000 and that they had been unable to manufacture merchandise and fulfill orders since the album's release.

== Background ==
Work on Tricks began as early as 2011, directly after the release of the band's fourth album, UnDeveloped, and continued through 2018. The album was officially announced on May 13, 2017 and was originally intended for release in October, 2017. When it became clear that the album still needed post-production refinement and would not be ready for October, Ohgr announced a tour co-headlining with fellow industrial band KMFDM. Ultimately, the album was released digitally on June 18, 2018. It was immediately followed by the announcement of a full North American tour with Lead into Gold as the opening act.

=== PledgeMusic controversy ===
Producer Mark Walk said that they chose to use PledgeMusic because it appeared to be "a safe place for supporters’ funds to be held while the project was being produced". They raised $20,000 within the first few days of the campaign and delivered the finished album to the company, who remained silent regarding payments. In a January 2019 article for Billboard, Walk explained that PledgeMusic owed the band $100,000 of their funds and that, due to the lack of money, had been unable to manufacture merchandise that had been promised during the campaign. They had only been paid $40,000. The band was forced to release the album digitally and go on tour without physical media to sell. When Walk threatened that he would take the issue to the press, a company employee reportedly asked "if anyone would care."

The band suspended their campaign and told fans that they were looking into alternative platforms and refunds. In February 2019, Sound Royalties, a music-finance firm, announced they had devoted $3 million in loans to help the dozens of artists affected by PledgeMusic's financial issues.

== Track listing ==
All songs written by Nivek Ogre and Mark Walk.

No.	Title	Length
1.	"Freaky"	4:09
2.	"Subject"	4:31
3.	"Tricks"	3:55
4.	"Due They Know"	5:04
5.	"Blowby"	4:54
6.	"Toxick"	4:31
7.	"Resolute"	4:22
8.	"Mind Made God"	5:16
9.	"Muddle"	4:59
10.	"Lye"	3:58
Total length:		45:43

CD-only bonus track
No.	Title	Length
11.	Untitled (hidden track begins after 9:09 of silence)	13:31
Total length:		59:14

Notes

- The following are the album's stylized track titles: "FreAky", "SubjecT", "TrickS", "dUe they kNow", "BlowBy", "ToxicK", "ResoLuTe", "Mind made goD", "MudDle", "LYe", and "uNtitleD".

== Personnel ==
All credits adapted from Tricks liner notes.

Ohgr

- Nivek Ogre – writing, vocals
- Mark Walk – writing, production

Additional personnel

- Rob Robinson – additional mixing, writing, mastering, and production
- Roman Dirge – artwork
