= Devils in my Details =

2008 album by OhGr

Studio album by ohGr
- Released: November 4, 2008 (Germany); November 4, 2008 (U.K.); November 5, 2008 (U.S.A.)
- Genre: Electronic, electro-industrial, industrial rock
- Length: 42:12
- Label: Synthetic Symphony (SPV GmbH)

OhGr chronology
SunnyPsyOp (2003)	Devils in my Details (2008)	unDeveloped (2011)

Professional ratings
Review scores
Source	Rating
Alternative Press	4/5
ChartAttack	3.5/5 stars
ReGen Magazine	4/5 stars
PopMatters	6/10
Sputnikmusic	4/5 stars

Devils in my Details is the third studio album by the electro-industrial band ohGr. It was released in the U.K. and Europe on November 4, 2008, and in the United States on November 5, 2008. It was the only ohGr release through the German label SPV. The album has the actor Bill Moseley providing spoken word poetry during various songs.

The original album title was purportedly Blurry Dotted I's, after Ogre's dog.

During an October 4, 2008, album streaming and discussion, Ogre announced that unreleased songs created during the production of Devils In My Details might be released as an album titled Dsides, though this material has yet to surface.

== Track listing ==
No.	Title	Length
1.	"Shhh"	4:40
2.	"Eyecandy"	6:04
3.	"Three"	2:53
4.	"Feelin' Chicken"	3:48
5.	"Pepper"	3:18
6.	"D.Angel"	1:23
7.	"Psychoreal"	3:20
8.	"Whitevan"	4:32
9.	"Timebomb"	4:46
10.	"Smogharp"	2:41
11.	"Witness"	4:47
Total length:		42:12

== Personnel ==
- Nivek Ogre - voice, keyboards, synthesisers
- Mark Walk - guitar, bass guitar, drums
- Bill Moseley - poetry/spoken word on tracks 4, 7, 9, 10, & 11
