= Tiny Meat =

Single by Ruby

from the album Salt Peter
- Released: 1995 (U.S.)
- Recorded: 1994–1995
- Genre: Alternative rock
- Length: 4:03
- Label: WORK/Creation
- Songwriters: Lesley Rankine, Mark Walk
- Producers: Lesley Rankine, Mark Walk

Ruby singles chronology
| "Paraffin" (1995) | "Tiny Meat" (1995) | "Hoops" (1996) |

"Tiny Meat" is the second single from the debut album Salt Peter by the trip hop/Industrial band Ruby. It is the band's best known song, and was released in 1995 in the United States by the WORK/Creation labels. "Tiny Meat" is the only single from Ruby that has charted in the U.S., reaching #22 on Billboard's Modern Rock Tracks in the spring of 1996. The single also charted in the United Kingdom, reaching #96.

== Track listing ==
The CD single came in two parts, each with three tracks on them:

- part one
1. "Tiny Meat" (album version) (4:03) -Rankine, Walk
2. "Tiny Meat" (Danny Saber Mix) (5:06) -Rankine, Walk
3. "Heidi" (Scream Team Remix) (7:48) -Rankine, Walk

total length: (16:57)

- part two
1. "Tiny Meat" (meat for the feet mix) (6:24) -Rankine, Walk
2. "Tiny Meat" (Mark Walk mix) (4:28) -Rankine, Walk
3. "Scunner" (4:02) -Rankine, Walk

total length: (14:54)

== Chart performance ==
=== Singles ===
| Date | Name | Chart | Country | Peak position |
|---|---|---|---|---|
| February 24, 1996 | "Tiny Meat" | UK Singles | United Kingdom | #96 |
| May, 1996 | "Tiny Meat" | Billboard Modern Rock Tracks | USA | #22 |

== Production and personnel ==
part one:

- track one

Produced by Mark Walk and Lesley Rankine, and mixed by Walk.

- track two

Produced by Walk and Rankine.
Remixed by Danny Saber, engineering and livestock mutilation by John X.

- track three

Produced by Walk and Rankine.
Remix produced by The Scream Team for Worldwide Scream Team Productions, engineered and mixed by Tim Holmes.

Artwork for the CD single by Rankine, photographs by Matthew Donaldson, and layout by Toby Egelnick.

part two:

- track one

Produced by Walk and Rankine.

- track two

Produced by Walk and Rankine.

- track three

Produced by Walk and Rankine.

== Music video ==
As with all of Ruby's singles, this track had a promotional video made for it.
