= Thee Temple ov Psychick Youth =

Network of occultists and chaos magic practitioners

Thee Temple ov Psychick Youth, abbreviated as TOPY, was a British magical organization, fellowship and chaos magic network founded in 1981 by Genesis P-Orridge, lead member of multimedia group Psychic TV. The network, including later members of Coil and Current 93, was a loosely federated organization of members and initiates operating as an order of ceremonial magic and sex magic, as well as an experimental artistic collective.

== Creation and influence ==
Their early network consisted of a number of "stations" worldwide including TOPY-CHAOS for Australia, TOPYNA for North America and TOPY Station 23 for the United Kingdom and Europe. Smaller, "grass-roots"-level sub-stations called Access Points were located throughout America and Europe. Throughout its existence, TOPY has been an influential group in the underground chaos magic scene.

== Theory and praxis ==
The Psychick Cross was a symbol frequently used by the organization

Potential TOPY members were encouraged to make magical sigils of a certain prescribed nature. These acts were to be performed on the 23rd hour (11:00pm) of the 23rd day of each month. If an individual chose to do so, they were invited to mail their sigils to a central location where the magical energy in them could be used to enhance others.

== Schisms ==
In the early 1990s, a rift occurred within the network when Genesis P-Orridge of Psychic TV, one of the few founding members still involved at that time, and probably the best known public face of TOPY during the 1980s, announced their departure from the organization. This was later exacerbated with Genesis P-Orridge claiming to have shut down the network upon leaving and requesting that the group no longer use the registered trademark of the Psychick Cross. Some remaining members of the network chose not to go along with this and carried on with TOPY which continued to grow and evolve throughout the 1990s and into the 21st century. Meanwhile Genesis P-Orridge moved on to other projects such as The Process, as well as a similar project called Topi.

Genesis P-Orridge's TOPY has been criticized by Dan Siepmann as being a front for abuses of power and developing a cult of personality.

== Key texts ==
There have been a number of texts produced by Thee Temple ov Psychick Youth to expound its philosophies. Some of the key texts produced over the years have been:

- Axiom 23
- Thee Sigilizers Handbook
- Thee Grey Book (which was important during the 1980s but is no longer distributed by TOPY)
- Thee Black Book
- Broadcast (the journal of TOPY)
- Thee Psychick Bible is a compilation of TOPY literature, with updates and personal additions by Genesis P-Orridge, edited by Jason Louv with foreword by Carl Abrahamsson.
- Dreamachine Plans created by Brion Gysin, T.O.P.Y. Document B-4 (1986); OV Press, Denver

== See also ==
- Dreamachine
