= Paraffin (song) =

Single by Ruby

from the album Salt Peter
- Released: September 4, 1995 (UK); November 7, 1995 (US)
- Recorded: 1994–1995
- Genre: Trip hop; Industrial
- Length: 3:38
- Label: WORK/Creation
- Songwriters: Lesley Rankine; Mark Walk
- Producers: Lesley Rankine; Mark Walk

Ruby singles chronology
"Paraffin" (1995)	"Tiny Meat" (1995)

"Paraffin" is the first single by British trip hop/industrial band Ruby, from their debut album, Salt Peter (1995). It was released in the United Kingdom on September 4, 1995, and in the United States on November 7, 1995, by the WORK/Creation record labels. The song was written and produced by Lesley Rankine and Mark Walk, and only charted in the UK and Australia, not in the US. As with all of Ruby's singles, "Paraffin" had a promotional video made for it.

== Release ==
The inside of the single jacket contains the following words:

"A craving for singularity... I can speak so softly because I hold so much power LISTEN FEEL SMELL There's so much more power in subtlety"

The phrase "I can speak so softly because I hold so much power" is the last lyric from the song "Heidi" on Ruby's first album Salt Peter. It also has three small pictures around the words, two of which would be the cover art for the follow-up singles "Tiny Meat" and "Hoops."

== Critical reception ==
Everett True from Melody Maker felt that "Paraffin" "does possess a certain unsteady grace, a certain velveteen charm". Another Melody Maker editor, Taylor Parkes, called it "a pretty little modern pop thing, chukka-chukka-bang and a sweet sloping chorus and halfway-intriguing, probably half-baked lyrics about flower thieves in the back yard and old men poking bony fingers in people's eyes; elsewhere things are deeper and more unlikely."

Simon Williams from NME wrote, "'Paraffin' is a stupendously contemporary record for someone who was last spotted hanging out with Ministry in Chicago, flirting as it is with appropriate remixes, and all manner of groovy chilled-out tinklings. A crucial shame then that it has all the atmosphere of a Lenny Kravitz B-side and thus slopes by like a rather embarrassed badger." Gareth Grundy from Select described it as "more Bomb the Bass than Big Black."

== Track listing ==
1. "Paraffin" (Red Snapper mix) (4:25) -Rankine, Walk
2. "Paraffin" (single mix) (3:35) -Rankine, Walk
3. "Paraffin" (Richard Fearless Dub) (8:05) -Rankine, Walk
4. "Paraffin" (Harpie mix) (3:53) -Rankine, Walk
5. "Heidi" (album version) (4:04) -Rankine, Walk

total length: (24:08)

== Production and personnel ==
The CD single was produced and written by Mark Walk and Lesley Rankine. It was mixed and engineered by Walk, with Scott Crane as assistant engineer. The object photos in it were by Matthew Donaldson, and artwork and the other photos by Rankine, except the one of Rankine which was by Joseph Cultice.

== Charts ==
Date	Name	Chart	Country	Peak position
September 16, 1995	"Paraffin"	UK Singles Chart	United Kingdom	#81
1995	"Paraffin"	ARIA Singles Chart	Australia	#179
