= Monster Voodoo Machine =

Canadian metal band

- Origin: Toronto, Ontario, Canada
- Genres: Industrial metal; groove metal
- Years active: 1991–1998, 2007–2014
- Labels: Epidemic, RCA
- Members: See below

Monster Voodoo Machine was a Canadian metal band formed in 1991 within Toronto, Ontario. They released two studio albums and three studio EPs in the 1990s, followed by a disbandment in 1998. The band then reformed for various one-off shows between 2007 and 2014.

== History ==
Monster Voodoo Machine was formed in Canada in 1991 by Toronto musician and vocalist Adam Sewell, inspired by bands like Quicksand, Black Flag and Discharge. The original line-up included guitarist Mark Gibson, bassist Terry Landry and drummer Drew Gauley. In their first six months together the band recorded one EP (Burn – released on Epidemic Records in 1992) and one full-length album (Turbine, which was not released) and filmed two promotional videos: "3 Year Plan" and "Bastard Child". The band also collaborated with techno group BTK ("Bastard Child – Techno Storm Mix") and begin recording sessions with soul singers.

Over the next year, the band added second guitarist Dave Rose and keyboardist Stacey Hoskin to the line-up, but the intense pace of touring and writing led to both guitarists Gibson and Rose leaving, replaced by Jason Cuddy (previously of Mundane) and Darren Quinn. Drummer Gauley also left after several tours, later himself joining Mundane. At first he was replaced by Dylan Huziak, followed shortly after by Dean Dallas Bentley.

In late 1993, the band recorded their second EP and major-label debut State Voodoo/State Control (released in 1994 on RCA Records). Produced by Paul Raven (of Killing Joke and Prong) and Walter Sobczak, the EP's title was a reference to the Discharge track "State Violence State Control". Musically, the EP saw the band move in a heavier and darker direction, similar to bands like White Zombie and Ministry. The EP also featured remixes from producers including Danny Saber (U2).

In late January 1994, the band relocated to Chicago to record their first full-length album Suffersystem, produced by Critter and Howie Beno at Chicago Trax studios. The album featured several guest appearances including Roddy Bottum of Faith No More, Leslie Rankin of Silverfish and Ruby, and Wesley Willis. On completing the album in the late spring, the band set out on a tour of around 500 shows, touring with Carcass, Life of Agony, Skrew, and Fight, before touring with Marilyn Manson in early 1995, on the two and a half month "Portrait of an American Family Tour".

Suffersystem won the 1995 Juno Award for "Best Hard Rock Album Of The Year". Around this time, the band also released a number of singles and EPs featuring remixes by artists such as Biohazard, DJ Muggs, KMFDM and Pigface. Sewell asked RCA to have the Chemical Brothers or Liam Howlett of The Prodigy produce the next album, but RCA declined, asking the band instead to consider Butch Vig. Disillusioned with RCA, Sewell asked to be released from their recording contract. In late 1995, the band was put "on hold" for the next year.

The band returned in 1996, joined by Soulstorm members Nick Sagias (keyboards) and bassist Chris Harris. They released 1,000 numbered copies of Pirate Satellite. However, shortly after that, the band announced that they were breaking up, and on October 4, 1996, they played a farewell show at the Volcano Club in Kitchener, Ontario.

Less than a year later, while on tour with def.con.sound.system. in 1997, Sewell was offered a record deal by Dr. Dream Records (a subsidiary of Polygram / Mercury) who suggested that the group use the Monster Voodoo Machine name. At the time def.con.sound.system. featured Sewell, Cuddy, Sagias, Harris, and occasionally Quinn and Bentley, so they agreed and began planning a new album.

As the group began working on new material, Sewell decided to record the album without the use of samplers, keyboards, or drum loops (Sagias, the band's keyboardist, was still credited for backing vocals however). The resulting album Direct Reaction Now! featured several def.con.sound.system. songs reworked into a rock format. The album was released in early 1998, just as Dr. Dream Records was shut down due to the Polygram and Universal Records merger, although the band had been invited to play the side stage on the Ozzfest Tour that year. Around the same time, Jason "Junior" Smith replaced Quinn on guitars and Dan Cornelius replaced Bentley on drums. After a few short tours with Queens of the Stone Age and Sevendust, the band played their final show in Montreal, Quebec.

In 2007, Monster Voodoo Machine reunited after a nine-year hiatus. The lineup consisted of Sewell, Landry, Cuddy, Quinn, and Bentley, in addition to Victor Rebelo on keyboards. The band then played various one-off shows afterwards. In October 2013, it was reported that original guitarist Gibson died at the age of 42 in his sleep.

== Discography ==
=== Albums ===
- Burn (1992, Epidemic)
- State Voodoo/State Control (1994, BMG/D-Tribe)
- Suffersystem (1994, BMG/D-Tribe)
- Pirate Satellite (1996, 45 Revolutions)
- Direct Reaction Now (1998, Doctor Dream)

== Members ==
=== Final members ===
- Adam "Doom" Sewell – vocals (1991–1998, 2007–2014)
- Terry Landry – bass (1991–1995, 2007–2014)
- Jason Cuddy – guitars (1993–1998, 2007–2014)
- Darren Quinn – guitars (1993–1998, 2007–2014)
- Dean "Dallas" Bentley – drums (1993–1998, 2007–2014)
- Victor Rebelo – keyboards (2007–2014)

=== Former members ===
- Mark "Gibson" Klucznyk – guitars (1991–1993; died 2013)
- Drew Gauley – drums (1991–1993)
- Stacey Hoskin – keyboards (1992–1995)
- Dave Rose – guitars (1992–1993)
- Dylan Huziak – drums (1993)
- Nick Sagias – keyboards (1995–1998)
- Chris Harris – bass (1995–1998)
- Jason "Junior" Smith – guitars (1998)
- Dan Cornelius – drums (1998)

=== Timeline ===
Color denotes main live duty.

== See also ==
- Canadian rock
- List of Canadian musicians
- List of bands from Canada
