= Rx (band) =

℞
- Genres: Industrial
- Years active: 1998
- Labels: Invisible Records
- Members: Nivek Ogre; Martin Atkins
- Website: Invisible Records

℞ or Rx was a one-off side project by Skinny Puppy band member Nivek Ogre, in collaboration with Invisible Records founder Martin Atkins. The project was originally called Ritalin, but the name was changed for legal reasons.

Rx released an album of industrial rock music, Bedside Toxicology, in 1998.

== Discography ==
- Bedside Toxicology (1998)
- Dubs (2006, Limited to 500 copies)

== See also ==
- Pigface, a band featuring Martin Atkins
- Skinny Puppy, a band featuring Nivek Ogre
