= Lenore, the Cute Little Dead Girl =

Comic by Roman Dirge

Lenore
- Original cover of issue 1 (1998)
- Created by: Roman Dirge

Publication information
- Publisher: Slave Labor Graphics, Titan Books
- Schedule: Yearly
- Formats: Ongoing series
- Genre: Macabre, Dark comedy
- Publication date: February 1998 – July 2007; July 2009 -present
- Main character(s): Lenore, Ragamuffin, Pooty

Lenore, the Cute Little Dead Girl is a black comedy comic series created by Roman Dirge, inspired by the poem "Lenore" by Edgar Allan Poe. Lenore has appeared in several comic books by Dirge. From 1998 to 2007, she featured in her own series published by Slave Labor Graphics. Twenty-six flash-animated shorts were also produced for Sony's ScreenBlast website in 2002. In July 2009, a new comic series started, now published by Titan Books and called Lenore Volume II. Previous issues were made into colored edition trade paperback called Lenore Volume I, which is separated into three books.

On 31 July 2013, Lenore Volume II #8 was released, marking the start of a plotline that continued for six issues.

== Plot outline ==
The comic tells of the unlife and adventures of the title character and her similarly odd (if not odder) friends. The story takes place in a small town called Nevermore (taking its name from "The Raven", another of Poe's poems) and the surrounding wilderness where Lenore's mansion and a nearby graveyard are situated.

The primary focus of the graphic novel is dark humor, with many of the stories having twist endings. Common themes are the reinvention of children's songs, games, and nursery rhymes to something more macabre, and subverting all sorts of pop culture icons and cultural figures into topics of dark comedy. In one story, for instance, Lenore accidentally kills the Easter Bunny. Lenore's actions often result in the death or injury to those around her and in various forms of chaos. Lenore is a character who is a mystery. She often thinks she is doing good and occasionally shows good intentions, although in later issues the character has shown a change in personality. When she is asked of what her dream is, she replies that it is to rule the world. To further question this, it should also be mentioned that whenever Lenore gets really upset or angry, she can be very violent and often takes her anger out on whoever made her angry even if it is one of her friends. This results in most of her friends (except for Mr. Gosh) being very fearful of her. She can also be spiteful. All of this results in Lenore being an enigma due to her at times thinking that she is doing good with a meaning to do good and at other times wanting to do something more along the lines of being evil.

The comic also featured various one-time side stories (one of these characters, Samurai Sloth, is set to star in his own series) and occasionally guest strips from other artists (with Jhonen Vasquez being the most frequent). A recurring comic strip called "Things Involving Me" tells about the author's life and experience in an exaggerated, semiautobiographical manner.

== Animated shorts ==
A series of 2–4 minute shorts produced by Adelaide Productions and Sony Pictures Digital Entertainment was created for Sony's ScreenBlast website. Any other website distributing these is doing so without Sony's permission, although Dirge has given permission for people to distribute them as they see fit.

All films begin with a line from Edgar Allan Poe's Lenore: "A dirge for her the doubly dead in that she died so young". "Dirge" also happens to be the pseudonymous surname of Lenore's creator.

No.	Title
1	"The New Toy"
Looking for a squeeze toy, Lenore walks into a pet shop, where she "accidentally" kills some hamsters. After telling the manager that they are all "broken", she walks out while the manager looks at the hamsters himself and vomits.
2	"Ragamuffin"
While searching through her toy collection, Lenore finds a rag doll which she attempts to sew up. However, when she prick herself, a drop of blood falls onto the doll, which gains consciousness. The doll, known as Ragamuffin, explains that 100 years ago, he was a vampire. After killing his last victim, he was cursed by her sister. Ragamuffin tries to attack Lenore. As her blood has been mixed with embalming fluid, Ragamuffin realises that he will remain a doll forever. Although distraught at first, he starts to settle into this new lifestyle.
3	"The Magician"
A magician attempts a dangerous trick and picks Lenore as a volunteer from the audience. Her involvement causes the death of the magician.
4	"Bloaty the Frog"
Lenore finds a dead frog that she believes is just sick. Remembering her mother's advice, she puts it in a summer dress and tries to feed it chicken soup (with a live chicken) much to Ragamuffin's bemusement. Later, the dead frog is driven to a hospital.
5	"The Taxidermy"
Lenore meets her neighbor, Taxidermy, who wants her to take care of his pet, Malakai. After poking it, the creature runs through the house. When Taxidermy returns, Lenore gives him Malakai back, which seems to have been crushed, and says that it was "No Trouble".
6	"The Return of Mr. Gosh"
Mr. Gosh returns from the grave to express his love to Lenore despite the fact that she has previously murdered him many times. Lenore kills her admirer again by repeatedly throwing knives at his head.
7	"Magic Muffin"
Lenore encounters a magical muffin elf and crushes him with her finger, then eats the muffin.
8	"A Walk in the City"
Lenore takes her dead cat for a walk through Nevermore, where she encounters an ugly woman. Much to Lenore's bemusement, the woman tries to convince her to smile. The woman then pretends to steal her nose. Lenore smiles before she reveals a knife and brutally murders the stranger, cutting off her nose, taking it home and storing it in a jar. ("Got your nose")
9	"Lenore, Queen of the Fairy Gnomes"
After Lenore finds a fairy costume, she is mistaken by gnomes for their long-lost queen. They take her to their lair, where she asks how, by being bored, they have grown so greatly in numbers. A gnome attempts to answer by using euphemisms for sexual intercourse, but instead this makes her believe that a "two-backed beast" is also in the lair. The other gnomes celebrate her arrival until she starts slaughtering them. The next scene shows that she has added them to her collection and says, "Now I just need to find that two-backed beast".
10	"The Tea Party"
Lenore has some friends over for a tea party. While they are sitting, Lenore notices a disguised person who reveals himself to be Mr. Gosh. After Lenore spikes his tea with poison, she and the others, despite Mr. Gosh suffering in the background, have a detailed conversation about a film.
11	"Grave Error"
After rising from the grave, Lenore gives evil stares to the others, but reverts to her normal face saying she is "just kidding". She then kills Mr. Gosh.
12	"The Thing What Came From the Poopy Chair"
Two scientists design a new toilet cleaner which supposedly "kills all bacteria". However, a mutated, living bacterium appears and gets into the sewer system. Coming out of Lenore's toilet, the bacterium attacks Lenore while she is sleeping. Lenore manages to trap it with the plunger and flush it back down the toilet. The scientists see the suffering bacterium return to their lab. Later, Lenore and Ragamuffin are shown to have built a barricade around the toilet.
13	"The Day Mr. Chippy Walked"
Half of a woodchuck, displayed on the wall, gains consciousness and complains about his lack of legs. Lenore fuses half of his body with legs of a doll, and the woodchuck rejoins his friends, but they do not accept him. When Lenore tells the viewer "at least today's weird stuff is over", the remaining half of the doll complains about her lack of legs.
14	"Hairball"
Lenore encounters a living hair clog of hers from her drain. However, it rants about her hair products and annoys Lenore.
15	"Fugly Duckling"
The narrator tells the story of the ugly duckling. Just as the duckling dreams about being a swan, Lenore steps out of the grass and continuously insults the duckling until eventually kicking it into the pond. She then exclaims, "I don't do guilt!". An "outtake" is then shown when, just as Lenore steps out of the grass, the narrator is attacked offscreen.
16	"Kitty #46 & Kitty #53"
Lenore feeds her cat (Kitty #46) and then accidentally strangles it. Later, she throws another cat (#53) into the bathtub, which subsequently jumps to the ceiling and falls back down again, to which Lenore claims: "Kitty Clean".
17	"Insurrection of the Insects"
Told as in a story book, flies fight back against a spider.
18	"The Dream Catcher (Part 1)"
A scarecrow dances the "forbidden dance" with Lenore in her dreamworld. It soon turns into a nightmare. Ragamuffin suggests that she hang a "dream catcher" from her bed to ward off the nightmares, but this fails and Lenore starts to threaten Ragamuffin.
19	"The Dream Catcher (Part 2)"
Lenore and Ragamuffin realise that the dream catcher has caught a creature, which calls himself "the toof hairy." Lenore gives him a chance to prove who he is, so the creature says that he has come for the tooth of the neighbour, Billy. He teleports to Billy's house, where he violently rips out his teeth while Ragamuffin continues to state that the creature is evil.
20	"Frito the Demon"
Also told like a story book, Frito the demon escapes hell.
21	"The Last Dance of the Ladybug"
In yet another story, a ladybug has her revenge.
22	"Little Bunny Foo Foo"
Parodying a nursery rhyme, Lenore (dressed as a rabbit) kills some field mice by whacking them with a mallet. A fairy appears, telling her to stop. Lenore then proceeds to do the same to an armadillo, but the fairy returns, telling her she cannot do it to any animal. She then does the same to the fairy. The moral of the story is "Be more specific."
23	"L'il Ballerina"
Lenore dances ballet in a graveyard, causing a loud reaction from the crows. She is then told to stop as a funeral is taking place. Later, Lenore and Ragamuffin do an Irish dance on the coffin despite the protests from the director.
24	"Death Bed"
While asleep, Lenore encounters the pets she killed. One of her cats (which she calls "Kitty #12") tries to get her to change her ways, but fails. Later, he tries to haunt her.
25	"Lenore's Last (Part 1)"
Lenore becomes sick and experiences severe flatulence. Ragamuffin takes her to the doctor, who finds out that she has no heartbeat, but disagreements between Lenore and the doctor result in the doctor's embarrassment.
26	"Lenore's Last (Part 2)"
Lenore finally agrees to be X-rayed, however, upon X-raying her, he finds that a rat is eating her skeleton. As he goes to "call some people", Lenore sees Death, who offers to take her "home". Ragamuffin does not see him and goes to fetch the doctor. Death tells Lenore to step through the portal, which she does. Ragamuffin and the doctor come back into the X-ray room only to find a dead (without consciousness) Lenore, who is mourned by the other characters the next day. In the underworld, various creatures celebrate her arrival. The storyline is continued in the comic series.

== Movie plans ==
Plans were made for the making of a Lenore feature film by Sony Family Entertainment. A script was written, but it was not approved by Dirge. The contract has expired. At his panel at the 2011 Comic Con, Roman Dirge announced that Neil Gaiman has agreed to serve as an executive producer for a CGI film adaptation, which has not materialized.

== Lenore by Titan Books ==
=== Lenore Volume I ===
Lenore Volume I consists of three hardcover graphic novels that include 12 issues of the original Lenore Series originally published by Slave Labor Graphics but in full color: Noogies (Issues 1-4), Wedgies (Issues 5-8) and Cooties (Issues 9-12). These three volumes were previously available as trade paperbacks published by Slave Labor Graphics with illustrations in black & white.

=== Lenore Volume II ===
Titan Magazines released a new line of Lenore comics in full color that started with a new #1 in 2009 and continues to be published up to the present. They also continue with their hardcover graphic novels line: "Swirlies" (which includes the extremely rare Vol. 1 #13 from the original series, also in full color, plus Vol. 2 issues #1-3), "Purple Nurples" (Vol. 2 issues #4-7) and "Pink Bellies" (Vol. 2 issues #8-11).

== Characters ==
From left to right: Taxidermy, Muffin Monster, Ragamuffin, and Mr. Gosh, waiting for Lenore to rise from the dead.

=== Lenore Lynchfast ===
Lenore is a 10-year-old undead girl who lives in a mansion with her other creepy friends. She died of pneumonia at the beginning of the 20th century, issue #14 had more of her origin revealed.

Her character has developed from being a somewhat malicious character in the early comics, hurting people out of spite or revenge, to a well-meaning but dim character who kills people by "accident", stemming from the fact that Lenore is generally unaware of her surroundings, as well as the fact that she is dead. Lenore says she loves animals (especially cats), but she constantly kills all her pets.

Later, she reverts to her old self and starts hurting those around her with full intentions on what she is doing, as it can be seen in issue #9, when she insults Ragamuffin and calls him all kinds of names and in issue #13 where she declares that her dream is to take over the world. Sometimes, she appears to enjoy others' misfortune, since she smiles when she hurts or kills them, and is often depicted as quite violent, especially when she is unhappy about something or when she is angry.

Lenore usually does and says things that do not make sense most of the time, resulting in the annoyance of her level-headed companion, Ragamuffin, who considers her a dimwit, calling her "special in the head". However, despite all that, whether she is really dense or she acts stupidly on purpose, just to torment Ragamuffin for fun, is unclear, because at times she is shown to be quite intelligent-such as in Vol. 2 issue #2, when she verbosely presents Mr. Gosh with various examples of "things she loves more than him" which are quite revolting but quite witty nonetheless.

After she is taken by Death to the Underworld, she escapes from there and returns to the living world, with Ragamuffin's help, who unburies her. She has two big, black wings, gained after her return from Hell. Apparently, she can let others see her wings only if she desires to.

In issue #9, she tries to tell Ragamuffin that he is her best friend, but she is interrupted by him, when he sprays a substance on her face to kill the worm that eats from her forehead.

Lenore gives Ragamuffin a Valentine's Day gift in the bonus comic from Vol. 2 issue #2, where he accepts it until he realizes what she has given him as a Valentine's Day card is, in fact, a 'nard'.

In the later issues, it is revealed that Lenore's last name is Lynchfast.

It is unknown if she has parents or not. Given that she is over a century dead, her birth parents would have also perished, but the way the priest talks to her in "Lil Ballerina" suggests that he may be a father figure to her.

It is also unclear what type of undead she is. She generally appears zombie-like, but she has small pointed canines like a vampire. Given the fact that she gained wings, she may likely be part-demon.

In the cartoon, she has a Southern accent.

=== Ragamuffin ===
Ragamuffin can at first sight look like a rag doll with worms for hair and polyester filling, but he has a very interesting background story and personality. Ragamuffin was a 400-year-old (as mentioned in issue #13) vampire who fed upon the flesh of the living. One night he attacked a young woman and ate her, but unfortunately, her sister, who happened to be a powerful witch, witnessed the scene. The witch cursed him and transformed him into a doll. A drop of Lenore's blood eventually returned him to consciousness, but since her blood was mixed with embalming fluid the curse was only partially lifted: he will never cease to be a doll. (He was briefly reverted into his original body at the end of issue #11, but returned to his rag doll form in the last frame of issue #12).

Ragamuffin is a little unsure of some of Lenore's crazier ideas and is oddly enough the occasional voice of reason in the comic. Still, as shown in the later comics, Ragamuffin is loyal to Lenore, often joining her plans in the flash-animated cartoons. He is often infuriated by her dimwitted behavior, but he goes along with her in the end. One example is in issue #13, when Lenore says that he is her little kid (or "baby", as she calls him) and, after many protests, he gives up and lets her put a baby bottle into his mouth. In contrast to the brutal, savage nature of his original vampire form, he seems quite interested in somewhat more humanlike activities as a ragged doll, though he does not admit it (he persistently denies it and tries to change the topic when Lenore accuses him of break-dancing in parachute pants in Vol. 2 issue #1).

Ragamuffin becomes very protective of Lenore and, in issue #12, when he is reverted into a vampire, he remains by her side and tries to defend her from the Nazi zombies that ascended from Hell. In the same issue, Ragamuffin threatens Mr. Gosh, when he disturbs Lenore, and makes him eat his own bowels. Also in Vol. 2 issue #1, Ragamuffin brutally murders Mortimer Fledge, who tries to get revenge on Lenore for quite unintentionally ruining his life. Ragamuffin seems worried when Lenore gets sick, takes her to a doctor and he is really devastated when she dies for the second time in Lenore's last (Part 2). These actions imply the fact that he views himself as her parental figure, or at least as her guardian. The supposition is validated by Pooty Applewater's letter, in issue #13, in which he tells Lenore that he cannot leave her with the Puff-Puff Midget, who calls himself Ragamuffin, to protect her. In issue #9, when Lenore falls briefly for Mr. Gosh (when his mask is removed) and shoves Ragamuffin away, he seems hurt and tells her he has feelings.

A new game based on Ragamuffin has been made, in which he plays the role of Lenore's rescuer. However the game had been pulled from the App Store as it was found to have a lot of glitches.

In the original, animated series, he is voiced by Roman Dirge, the titular author of the comics. Dirge hopes to continue as the voice of Ragamuffin in the Lenore movie.

=== Pooty Applewater ===
Pooty Applewater made his first appearance in issue #9 as a bounty hunter sent to bring Lenore back to the underworld. Lenore convinced him to let her stay and he became one of her friends, playing a part in the battles that followed. He has a small, bucket-like head and carries a trident. In #13 Pooty suddenly vanished leaving a note that informed Lenore and Ragamuffin that his ex-wife wanted child support and that he would be fleeing to Norway or Mexico. But, 2 issues later, he re-appeared in Issue 3, Volume 2, and has stayed with Lenore and Ragamuffin as a permanent resident since.

Since this, Pooty and Ragamuffin's 'buddy-hate' relationship has only begun to increase. At times, they lend each other a hand when they need one, (such as when they worked together to hide the Bloody Birthday clowns in issue #6 Volume 2, or when Ragamuffin helped Pooty pull a splinter out of his ass in Issue #8 Volume 2), but they also can betray each other in small ways at the same time, and weakly argue like an old married couple. (Like when Pooty asked to take a picture with Ragamuffin, and made him look completely ridiculous by drawing and writing things to make fun of him in the background, or when Ragamuffin 'agreed' to tell Lenore how her parents actually left her and were killed by Taxidermy, but instead gave the wheel to Pooty by saying, "Lenore, Pooty has something to tell you. And if he doesn't, it means he hates you a lot.")

It is also said by Lenore herself that she had always suspected there was a hinted romance going on between them, but never said anything.

=== Mr. Gosh ===
Mr. Gosh appears to be a human-sized sock puppet man with buttons as eyes, but he is a dead person with a bag over his head. He is madly and obsessively in love with Lenore. Even after being killed several times by Lenore, he keeps returning from the grave — often saying that he forgives her for killing him, as he supposed she always does it by "accident". He is also unpopular among some of Lenore's friends, especially Ragamuffin, who threatened to feed Mr. Gosh his own bowels if he bothered Lenore again in issue 12. The threat was carried out in the next panel. Lenore's repeated murders of Mr. Gosh include the "Lawnmower Incident", in which she ran him over repeatedly (according to Mr. Gosh himself, 164 times) with a lawnmower, after he proposed to her. Some of his other injuries include: being poisoned, being set on fire, bashed with a shovel, stabbed in the head 6 times, and having his head explode, yet he still loves Lenore with all his heart. Lenore actually falls for him briefly when his hood is removed by Pooty. When Lenore realizes who he is, well, more than his heart is broken. Beneath his hood his head is rotten and causes all who look upon it to vomit, except Lenore; she finds Mr. Gosh much more attractive without his hood. This could be his 'true form' or it could be due to the 'lawnmower incident'. It is revealed in volume 2, issue 2 that he inherited a cupcake castle, which he used to live in before he moved to be closer to Lenore.

In issue 2 Volume 2, after finally having been rejected far enough and realizing how over-compulsive his advances on Lenore were, Mr. Gosh eventually fled to his cupcake castle in hopes of distancing himself from her, and trying to make a new start to move on with his life. (But, of course, not before letting Lenore in on the word of his inheritance). Once there, Lenore soon followed, and while trying to just forget she had even existed so he could finally live with a peace of mind, he was indirectly forced to take her in for a tour of his new home. After being utterly taken by all of the wealth (in sweets and toys) her ex-stalker possessed, she weakly attempted to convince him, the very second after they walked into the castle's vast Hall of Toys, that she was in love with him after all, and even 'agreed' to marry without a pre-nup. Although Mr. Gosh could spot-on see through her plan, even admitting he did straight to her, once she held his hand, his only first reaction was to feel incredibly sad, but still acknowledged that she was trying to trick him. So, in order to get rid of this feeling once and for all, he took Lenore and Ragamuffin outside, along with a good amount of TNT, and told her that if she loved him, even if his entire castle blew up, to stay where she was. After he pushed the lever down on the explosives, and his inheritance had been completely destroyed, he looked over to what he thought to be Lenore, and had a moment of pure happiness and total excitement. Which, is actually pretty heartbreaking to read, when he then discovers moments later that it's nothing more than a cardboard cut-out of her. (signaling that she left in the blink of an eye. Probably before he even destroyed the castle).

Gosh's current whereabouts are unknown, but due to his presence on the cover of Issue #11, Volume 2, he may or may not appear once again in the climax of Volume 2.

=== Taxidermy ===
Taxidermy is Lenore's odd-looking neighbor, who claims that his strange appearance is a 'medical condition'. As his name suggests, his very first appearance in the comics had him looking like a tall, emaciated, suit-wearing deer with a stitched-up head, and he even had hooves for hands. He later (and currently) takes on the appearance of a human with a rotting, taxidermied deer head. The latter design was also adopted for the flash cartoon. Despite his rather ghastly appearance, Taxidermy is a mostly benevolent character and very much an intellectual. He has a little pet named Malakai, confirmed to be a taxidermy form by Roman Dirge on the SpookyLand forums. Taxidermy also leads a horde of taxidermied animals. The horde appears occasionally to assist Lenore and her friends against their enemies. Taxidermy was set to have his own full color 32-page comic, but Roman Dirge gave up on it after 9 pages. According to him, it is sitting in a box just waiting to be finished.

From Volume II #8, Taxidermy's back story and history are revealed dating back to Ancient Egypt. Taxidermy, named Taxen Ra, punished parents who inflicted abuse on their offspring and their demise depended on whatever form of abuse took place. Taxidermy was imprisoned as a result for taking on the Egyptian gods but was later discovered by an archaeologist who accidentally released him. Taxidermy was dubbed as 'The Orphanage' by the press, for the many killings of children's parents, including Lenore's, which was revealed in issue 9, Volume 2. He left gifts and notes for every child he assisted and was never captured.

He lives in a cabin just behind Lenore's house and assists her when needed.

Dirge also has a life-sized 7 ft Taxidermy in his living room that he along with a friend built in 2004 on a mannequin. During his Comic Con 2011 panel, Dirge told of how the head of the Taxidermy has become less stiff over time as the head is removable for the statue to be moved around. This resulted in the head turning unexpectedly during a video game session and scaring him and a friend. Comic Con '04 also resulted in Taxidermy's head almost being stolen by a passer-by when Dirge had placed it on the table after the signing had finished. Luckily a member of the staff had seen this and got the head back.

=== Muffin Monster ===
The Muffin Monster is a dark green-coloured creature who made his first appearance in issue #5 at Lenore's tea party. Not much is known about him except that he likes muffins which seem to give him gas. He dies in an issue titled The Creepig Creeping, killed by the titular Creepig. Lenore insists that he will be fine and attend her tea party, and he seemingly does, but is revealed to simply be a propped-up corpse.

=== Kitty ===
Lenore often carries a dead kitten with her. The kittens weren't dead when she got them, but she accidentally kills every kitty she takes care of. At one point, she is confronted by the spirit of "Kitty #12" about her cruel behaviour towards animals. She attempts to justify her actions by claiming that her victims were evil. In the process she accidentally kills a bunny in a fan claiming that it looked hot. She had planned to get a weasel, but it was "too fast".

=== The Spam Witch ===
She first appears in installment #12 of the Lenore comic series. She is summoned by Pooty Applewater to help them defeat the Zombie Nazi hordes. Pooty refers to her, saying "That's It. I'm calling in The Spam Witch." He then holds up an object resembling a key or a bottle opener. The Spam Witch appears in a light blue cloud of stars. She is naked, save for a traditional, black witch's hat; she is an odd pinkish color and sort of square in shape; she rides a broom, which she is never seen off of; also on the broom is a small black cat with yellow eyes, who is never seen saying or doing anything. The Spam Witch and Pooty Applewater have an awkward exchange implying a past intimate relationship which did not resolve well. She gives Pooty a spell book to help them close the door to Heck. She then flies off, crashing into the cellar, and is supposedly eaten by a pack of dogs. The Spam Witch reappears in Chapter Two of Purple Nurples, Wrath of the Creepig. Pooty summons The Spam Witch and Lenore summons Herman Von Ficklefrog (a frog in a bowler hat), the two appear in light blue poofs, then proceed to make out in front of Lenore, Pooty, and Ragamuffin. The Spam Witch is instructed by Pooty to enact Plan 66. She casts a spell on the Creepig, saying, "Maniratoo Shampup-Kiss." Effectively neutralizing the threat by shrinking the Creepig to such a size that it will never be able to destroy Lenore, not matter how hard it tries. The Spam Witch is then involved in a celebratory tea party.

=== Undead Nazis ===
Zombie versions of dead Nazi soldiers ascend from Hell after Ragamuffin accidentally releases them. Their mission on Earth is to bring back the escaped Lenore, which they nearly succeed in doing. They are, however thwarted by Ragamuffin, temporarily reverting to his original, vampire form, and Lenore's neighbors, including Taxidermy. This plotline progresses in issues #9 through #12.

=== Ouchie Boo-Boo ===
First appearing in issue #10, Ouchie Boo-Boo is sent to capture Pooty and Lenore and return them to the underworld disguised as Lenore's sister. She turns out to be a skilled opponent, but Pooty kills her in issue #11.

=== Wicket Willowbean ===
Wicket was introduced in issue #13 and is claimed by Pooty to be his cousin. Despite first revealing himself to be a horrible demon, he then showed his real (supposedly more terrifying) form which is basically Pooty with a round helmet.

=== Mortimer Fledge ===
Mortimer first appeared in #1 of Volume II seeking revenge on Lenore, after her unexpectedly coming back to life during him embalming her created a dramatic change to his life, losing his family and his business. Mortimer was sprayed with embalming fluid which caused him to become immortal; however, had re-built himself to finally take Lenore and finish his job of embalming her. He meets his demise when Ragamuffin rescues Lenore.
