= OhGr =

Canadian industrial band

ohGr
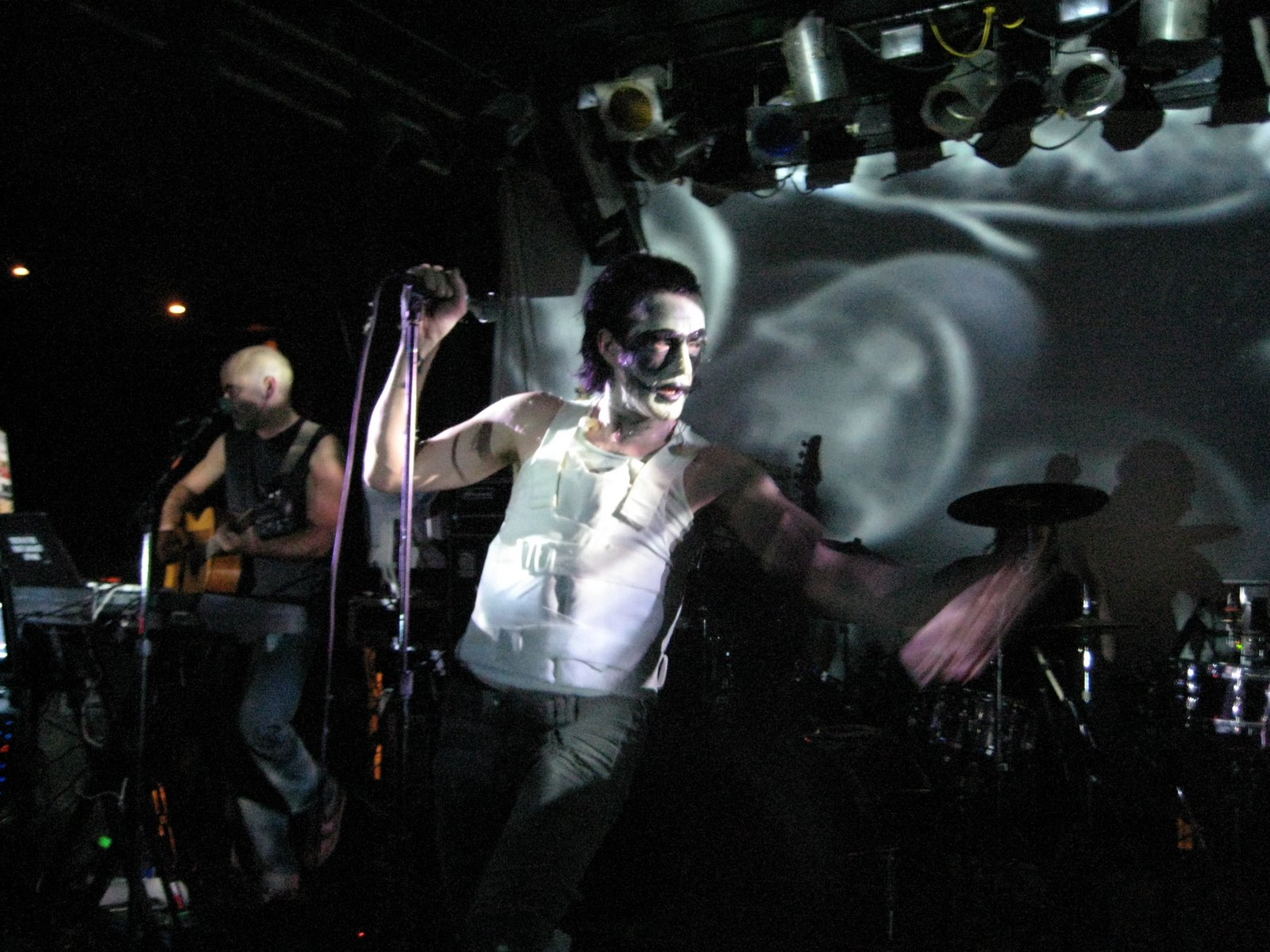
- Nivek Ogre circa 2008

Background information
- Also known as: W.E.L.T. (1995); The Petty Tyrants (1996); Ogre
- Origin: Los Angeles, California, United States
- Genres: Synthpop, electronic, IDM, electro-industrial, post-industrial
- Years active: 2000–present
- Labels: Spitfire, SPV, Metropolis
- Members: Nivek Ogre; Mark Walk; William Morrison; Justin Bennett; Jeff "Squigg" Smith
- Past members: Tim Sköld cEvin Key; Bill Rieflin
- Website: ohGr.org

ohGr is an American industrial band formed by Canadian musicians Nivek Ogre and Mark Walk, formerly of Skinny Puppy. Early ohGr releases incorporated hip hop and synth-pop influences, and in contrast to Skinny Puppy, utilized conventional structures and a lighter tone. Ogre noted that this direction was inspired by the pop bands he enjoyed as a child, such as The Archies. However, in releases such as Devils in my Details, ohGr has taken to a more abrasive, non-linear flavour of electro-industrial, while continuing to release pop albums such as 2018's Tricks.

== History ==
The band was officially formed in 2000, although the material for the first album, Welt dates back to the mid-nineties, having been held up due to legal trouble with American Recordings. W.E.L.T. was actually originally the title of the group (an acronym of "When Everyone Learns Truth"), until it was discovered that in the interval it had been taken by a Californian punk band. Al Jourgensen was also originally involved (who had the then band's name tattooed in anticipation of the project), and only one track he collaborated on has been leaked to the public, titled "Noreen". The music of that song later became industrial metal group Ministry's "The Fall", on their 1996 album Filth Pig.

ohGr's third album titled Devils in my Details was released on October 17, 2008, in Germany, on October 20 in the United Kingdom, and on October 21 in the United States. ohGr toured in support of the album release during the autumn of 2008. At Comic-Con 2008, Ogre announced that Bill Moseley will be contributing to the new ohGr album, as a result of them becoming friends through Repo! The Genetic Opera.

It was tentatively revealed in a chat with the band that an album of B-sides from Devils in my Details (entitled "D-Sides") and an album of unreleased material from the 1990s (entitled "Dfault") was due to be released. In October 2009 a link to www.wdihtf.com appeared on Skinny Puppy's website. When users sign up to the mailing list they receive a link to the song COLLIDOSKOPE which starts with many different voices saying "Welcome to Collidoskope".

As of May 10, 2011, ohGr has released a new studio album, unDeveloped. The album was a collaboration with Mark Walk, with whom the previous album was created. Also on the album was the audio from the 911 call reporting Michael Jackson's death (Track titled crash).

In 2017, ohGr announced a PledgeMusic campaign to raise funds for their new album Tricks. The album was originally scheduled for release on October 31, 2017, but was delayed due to mastering errors. The band submitted their final mix to PledgeMusic in Spring 2018, but received no word from the company regarding payment. Without the money promised by PledgeMusic, the band released the album digitally and went on tour without any physical media to sell. Walk went to the media following reports of similar situations happening to other bands who were using PledgeMusic. According to Walk, the band had received only $40,000 of the $140,000 they had raised during the campaign and were unable to pay for the manufacturing of the products they promised fans.

== Touring ==
The band toured in 2001 to support the release of their debut album Welt; the live band consisted of Nivek Ogre, Tim Sköld (bass), cEvin Key (drums, keyboards), Loki der Quaeler (keyboards), and William Morrison (guitars). 2003 saw the release of a follow-up, SunnyPsyOp (a play on the phrase "sunny side up" and military PsyOps). There were initially plans to tour for SunnyPsyOp, with Ministry in a festival type arrangement. These plans fell through, although much of the material from the second album had already been played live on the Welt tour.

2008 saw ohGr on tour throughout the U.S. and Canada in support of the album Devils in my Details with a live band including William Morrison returning on guitars, drummer Justin Bennett, keyboardist Jeff "Squigg" Smith.

In late 2011, ohGr announced a December 2011 West Coast USA and Canada tour consisting of nine dates with direct support by fellow Metropolis Records artist Left Spine Down.

== Videos ==
ohGr has released three promotional videos, all directed by William Morrison. The first was a stop-motion creation for the track "Cracker". The second was a live performance of "Minus", filmed by Michael Condo at several venues from the 2001 tour. The third was for "MaJiK", from the second album; this also employed stop-motion, and was a collaboration with artist Thomas Kuntz. "Cracker" and "MaJiK" have both been played occasionally on MTV2 and Fuse. All three have been available through ohGr's website, and "MaJiK" appeared on the audio CD for SunnyPsyOp, albeit with some serious technical glitches.

== Discography ==
=== Studio albums ===
Album details	Peak positions	
Album details	US Top Heatseekers	US D/ El.
Welt: Released: March 20, 2001; Formats: CD and LP	–	–
SunnyPsyOp: Released: July 1, 2003; Format: CD	–	13
Devils in my Details: Released: November 4–5, 2008; Format: CD and LP	18	9
unDeveloped: Released: May 10, 2011; Format: CD	27	13
TrickS: Released: June 18, 2018; Format: CD, LP, and digital		

=== Singles ===
- "Cracker" (CD single, includes QuickTime video for Cracker, 2001)
- "Cracker/Pore" (limited release clear vinyl single, May 2001)
- "Timebomb (Radio Edit)" (CD promotional single, 2009)
- "Welcome to Collidoskope" (self-released digital single, 2009)
- "Tragek" (self-released digital single, includes spoken word version of Tragek, 2010)
