= Feels Like Heaven (album) =

Feels Like Heaven… Sounds Like Shit

Remix album by Pigface
- Released: October 10, 1995
- Genre: Industrial
- Label: Invisible Records

Pigface chronology
Notes From Thee Underground (1994)	Feels Like Heaven… Sounds Like Shit (1995)	A New High in Low (1997)

Professional ratings
Review scores
Source	Rating
AllMusic	1.5/5 stars

Feels Like Heaven… Sounds Like Shit is a 1995 remix album by Pigface.

== Track listing ==
1. Dialogue - Pigface
2. Think (Addiction/Salvation Mix) - Martin Atkins
3. Steamroller (Steaming Pig Mix) - Skatenigs
4. Hagseed (Slagseed Slagadelic Mix) - Psychic TV
5. Dialogue - Pigface
6. Fuck It Up (Did You Ever Get The Feeling?)
7. Chikasaw (Jungle Dub Mix) - Law & Order
8. Suck (Double Dipped And Plastered Mix)
9. Asphole (On The Floor/We Know Who You Are)
10. Steamroller (Club Mix) - DHS
11. Dialogue - Michael Lawder
12. Sick Asp Fuck (Number 1 Club Mix) - Pigface
13. Empathy (Clarified Vision Mix) - Martin Atkins/Julian Herzfeld
14. Divebomber (Devilish Mix) - Jason Mcninch
15. Chikasaw (No Shit Pussy Mix) - Martin Atkins/Julian Herzfeld
16. Chikasaw (Ten Inch Mix) - Youth
