= Welt (album) =

Studio album by ohGr
- Released: March 20, 2001
- Recorded: 1995, 1999
- Genre: Electro-industrial, electronic
- Length: 44:03
- Label: Spitfire Records
- Producer: Mark Walk; Nivek Ogre

OhGr chronology
Welt (2001)	SunnyPsyOp (2003)

Professional ratings
Review scores
Source	Rating
AllMusic	2/5 stars
Alternative Press	April 2001, p.74

Welt (stylized as weLt) is the debut studio album by the band ohGr, formed by Nivek Ogre of Skinny Puppy, and musician/engineer Mark Walk. The song "Water" has been featured in the motion pictures Life as a House and for the end titles in Kill Theory. The album artwork was created by comic book artist Roman Dirge.

== Track listing ==
All songs written by Nivek Ogre and Mark Walk.

No.	Title	Length
1.	"wAteR"	4:27
2.	"dEVIl"	4:37
3.	"kettLE"	3:50
4.	"EARTHwORm"	3:21
5.	"luSId"	3:50
6.	"porE"	3:57
7.	"chaoS"	4:08
8.	"craCKer"	3:31
9.	"SolOW"	4:47
10.	"suhlEap"	3:16
11.	"miNUS"	4:19
Total length:		44:03

== Singles ==
"Cracker" and "Pore" were issued in a limited edition 12-inch promotional vinyl single.

== Personnel ==
- Nivek Ogre
- Mark Walk
- William Rieflin – additional percussion (3), additional instrumentation (6)
- Scott Crane – additional instrumentation (6)
- Roman Dirge – artwork

== Notes ==
- The project ohGr was originally titled W.E.L.T., an acronym meaning "When Everyone Learns Truth." Ogre and Walk adopted the title ohGr when they learned that another band had taken the Welt namesake during the 5-year period in which Ogre attempted to retrieve the master tapes of W.E.L.T. from American Records.
- The video for the song "craCKer" (by director William Morrison) features stop motion animation and parodies of Eminem, Nine Inch Nails, and Marilyn Manson.
