= Ruby discography =

This is a discography for the band Ruby.

== Studio albums ==
- Salt Peter (November 1, 1995, WORK/Creation)
  - Produced by Mark Walk, Lesley Rankine; recorded at Mommy's Cunt, Butler, Soundhouse Studios, Seattle, Washington – June 1994 to January 1995
- Short-Staffed at the Gene Pool (April 24, 2001, Thirsty Ear/Wichita)
  - Produced by Mark Walk, Lesley Rankine
- Waiting for Light (August 1, 2014)
  - Produced by Scott Firth, Lesley Rankine

== EPs ==
- Revert to Type (July 9, 2013)
- Type-Cast (November 2016)

== Remix albums ==
- Revenge, the Sweetest Fruit: Salt Peter Remixed (April 8, 1996, Creation/WORK) US only
  - Produced by Mark Walk, Lesley Rankine; recorded at Mommy's Cunt, Butler, Soundhouse Studios, Seattle, Washington – June 1994 to January 1995
- Stroking the Full Length (October 29, 1996, WORK/Creation) UK only
- Produced by Mark Walk, Lesley Rankine; recorded at Mommy's Cunt, Butler, Soundhouse Studios, Seattle, Washington – June 1994 to January 1995* released on labels
- Altered and Proud, the Short Staffed Remixes (July 17, 2001; Thirsty Ear/Wichita)
- Produced by Mark Walk, Lesley Rankine

== Singles ==
=== From Salt Peter ===
- "Paraffin" (November 7, 1995, WORK/Creation)
- "Tiny Meat" (1995, WORK/Creation)
- "Hoops" (January 1, 1996, WORK/Creation)

=== From Short-Staffed at the Gene Pool ===
- "Grace" (March 20, 2001, Wichita/Thirsty Ear)
- "Beefheart" (July 31, 2001, Wichita/Thirsty Ear)
- "Lamplight" (2002, Wichita/Thirsty Ear)

== Chart performance ==
=== Singles ===
| Date | Name | Chart | Country | Peak position |
|---|---|---|---|---|
| September 16, 1995 | "Paraffin" | UK Singles | United Kingdom | 81 |
| September 16, 1995 | "Paraffin" | UK Singles (with exclusions below the top 75) | United Kingdom | 78 |
| 1995 | "Paraffin" | ARIA Singles Chart | Australia | 179 |
| February 24, 1996 | "Tiny Meat" | UK Singles | United Kingdom | 96 |
| February 24, 1996 | "Tiny Meat" | UK Singles (with exclusions below the top 75) | United Kingdom | 86 |
| May 1996 | "Tiny Meat" | Billboard Modern Rock Tracks | United States | 22 |
| June 8, 1996 | "Hoops" | UK Singles | United Kingdom | 102 |
| June 8, 1996 | "Hoops" | UK Singles (with exclusions below the top 75) | United Kingdom | 90 |

=== Albums ===
| Date | Name | Chart | Country | Peak position |
|---|---|---|---|---|
| May 11, 1996 | Salt Peter | Billboard Heatseekers Albums | United States | 14 |
| April 20, 1996 | Salt Peter | UK Artist Albums | United Kingdom | 96 |
| 1996 | Salt Peter | ARIA Albums Chart | Australia | 240 |
