= Chris Alexander (editor) =

Canadian film director, writer and publisher

Chris Alexander is a Canadian magazine editor, film critic, film director, musician, composer, teacher and writer. He was the editor-in-chief of Fangoria and is the editor-in-chief and co-founder of Delirium magazine.

== Career ==
In 2010 Alexander became the editor-in-chief of New York City based horror film magazine Fangoria, a position he held until September 2015, when he stepped down in favor of pursuing his directorial and music career. Alexander also stated that he intended to continue to contribute editorial content but that he also intended to focus on Delirium, a Full Moon Features magazine he launched with filmmaker Charles Band.

Alexander was previously a publicist with Warner Bros. Canada and later, a writer and columnist for Rue Morgue and also the editor and publisher of the official magazine for the rock band Kiss. Alexander has also worked as a radio personality for AM 640 on The John Oakley Show from 2004 to 2009 and for Rue Morgue Radio from 2004 to 2007. He has composed music for several horror films and productions such as the radio drama series Fangoria's Dreadtime Stories. In 2006, Alexander participated in the Raging Boll stunt in Vancouver, boxing genre filmmaker Uwe Boll.

His 2012 debut film Blood for Irina won the Best Experimental Feature Film award at the 2013 PollyGrind Film Festival. The film’s fluid, hypnotic style, self-composed electronic music and focus on image and emotion as opposed to plot and dialogue remains a hallmark of all of Alexander’s film work.

Alexander is also the co-founder of Toronto-based horror and cult film convention Horror-Rama.

Alexander is the creator and instructor of horror movie history course Fear on Film, initially offered through Canada’s Sheridan College and later via New York based learning centre Morbid Anatomy.

His fourth feature film (and third in the “Irina” cycle) Blood Dynasty was released to streaming and VOD in 2017. The film was later licensed by Darkside Releasing for Blu-ray release.

Alexander's fifth film was Space Vampire, an experimental, psychological and psychedelic “fever dream” with science fiction and horror overtones, shot using 16mm film, toy cameras and digital devices. Produced by Alexander and Ali Chappell The film was completed in 2020 and was released in 2021 (alongside his 7th feature film Girl With a Straight Razor) by Darkside Releasing.

Alexander created the Delirium Films label for Full Moon, which yielded his feature films It Knows You’re Alone, Scream of the Blind Dead and Parasite Lady.

Alexander was one of the directors attached to Full Moon's Deadly Ten project. Production began on Necropolis: Legion starring Augie Duke, Lynn Lowry and Canadian actress Ali Chappell in June 2019 with a release date set for November 29, 2019 on the Full Moon Features streaming channel and on December 2, 2019 on Amazon Prime. The film was later re-released in a longer "director's cut" on May 8, 2020 on Amazon Prime and other digital platforms with a DVD release that followed in October, 2020.

His 2025 experimental vampire film Drakulon was based on his same-named concept record, both of which featured art by Spanish/Canadian painter Suspiria Vilchez.

Alexander has appeared in dozens of documentaries and produced and/or directed many others, such as When Romero Met Del Toro and Cronenberg: The Early Years. In 2025 he began working with John Gore's revived Hammer Films studio, writing and directing feature documentaries under their "Hammer Presents" line.

== Bibliography ==
- Chris Alexander's Blood Spattered Book (2010)
- Corman/Poe: Interviews and Essays Exploring the Making of Roger Corman’s Edgar Allan Poe Films, 1960-1964 (2023)
- Art! Trash! Terror!: Adventures in Strange Cinema (2025)

== Discography ==
- Music for Parasites (2008)
- Music for Murder (2015)
- Blue Eyes of the Broken Doll (2017)
- They Drink Your Blood (2018)
- Body Double (2020)
- Drakulon (2025)

=== Film scores ===
- Blood for Irina (2012)
- Devil's Mile (2013)
- Queen of Blood (2014)
- She Who Must Burn (2015)
- Female Werewolf (2015)
- Blood Dynasty (2017)
- Necropolis: Legion (additional music, 2020)
- Space Vampire (2020)
- It Knows You’re Alone (2021)
- Girl With a Straight Razor (2021)
- Scream of the Blind Dead (2021)
- Parasite Lady (2023)
- Drakulon (2025)

== Filmography ==
- Blood for Irina (2012)
- Queen of Blood (2014)
- Female Werewolf (2015)
- Blood Dynasty (2017)
- When Romero Met Del Toro (2017)
- Space Vampire (2020)
- Necropolis: Legion (2020)
- It Knows You’re Alone (2021)
- Girl With a Straight Razor (2021)
- Scream of the Blind Dead (2021)
- Parasite Lady (2023)
- Drakulon (2025)

=== Interviews ===
- Why Horror? (2014, as himself)
