= Queen of Blood (2014 film) =

- Directed by: Chris Alexander
- Written by: Chris Alexander
- Starring: Shauna Henry; Carrie Gemmell; David Goodfellow
- Cinematography: Chris Alexander; David Goodfellow
- Edited by: Chris Alexander
- Music by: Chris Alexander; Carrie Gemmell
- Production company: Autonomy Pictures
- Distributed by: Autonomy Pictures
- Release date: April 4, 2014 (IHSFF)
- Country: United States
- Language: English

Queen of Blood is a 2014 vampire film that was written and directed by Chris Alexander and is a follow-up to his 2012 film Blood for Irina. The film had its world premiere on 4 April 2014 at the International Horror and Sci-Fi Film Festival and has actress Shauna Henry returning to reprise the character of Irina. A DVD and VOD release will occur in September 2015.

Alexander shot part of the film using his iPhone and stated that "my recurring effect of swirling blood and colored chemicals are captured by the iPhone with absolutely no color correcting or post-production interference."

Of the film's inspiration, Alexander wanted to create a "vampire version of Werner Herzog’s Aguirre, the Wrath of God, and, so, I wrote a theme that reminded me a little bit of the late, great Popol Vuh’s work on Aguirre".

== Premise ==
The vampiress Irina (Shauna Henry) has been reborn and has set her sights on a pregnant young widow (Carrie Gemmell), intent on claiming the woman's child as her own.

== Cast ==
- Shauna Henry as Irina
- Carrie Gemmell as Widow
- David Goodfellow as Woodsman
- Nivek Ogre as Preacher

== Reception ==
Ain't It Cool News gave Queen of Blood a mostly positive review, comparing it favorably to early Jess Franco vampire films. NOW Toronto was more mixed and commented "Part prequel, part sequel and full-on homage to the moody Euro horrors Alexander grew up watching, it's perhaps a little less effective than its predecessor, but if you're tuned in to the Mario Bava/Jean Rollin vibe, you'll like what it's doing." DVD Talk wrote a mixed review for the film, stating that while they didn't care for the way Queen of Blood was shot while stating that they did enjoy the soundtrack and dialogue-free approach.

== Sequel ==
Henry returned for a third film titled Blood Dynasty. It was released October 31, 2017.
