= Silverfish (band) =

British indie rock band

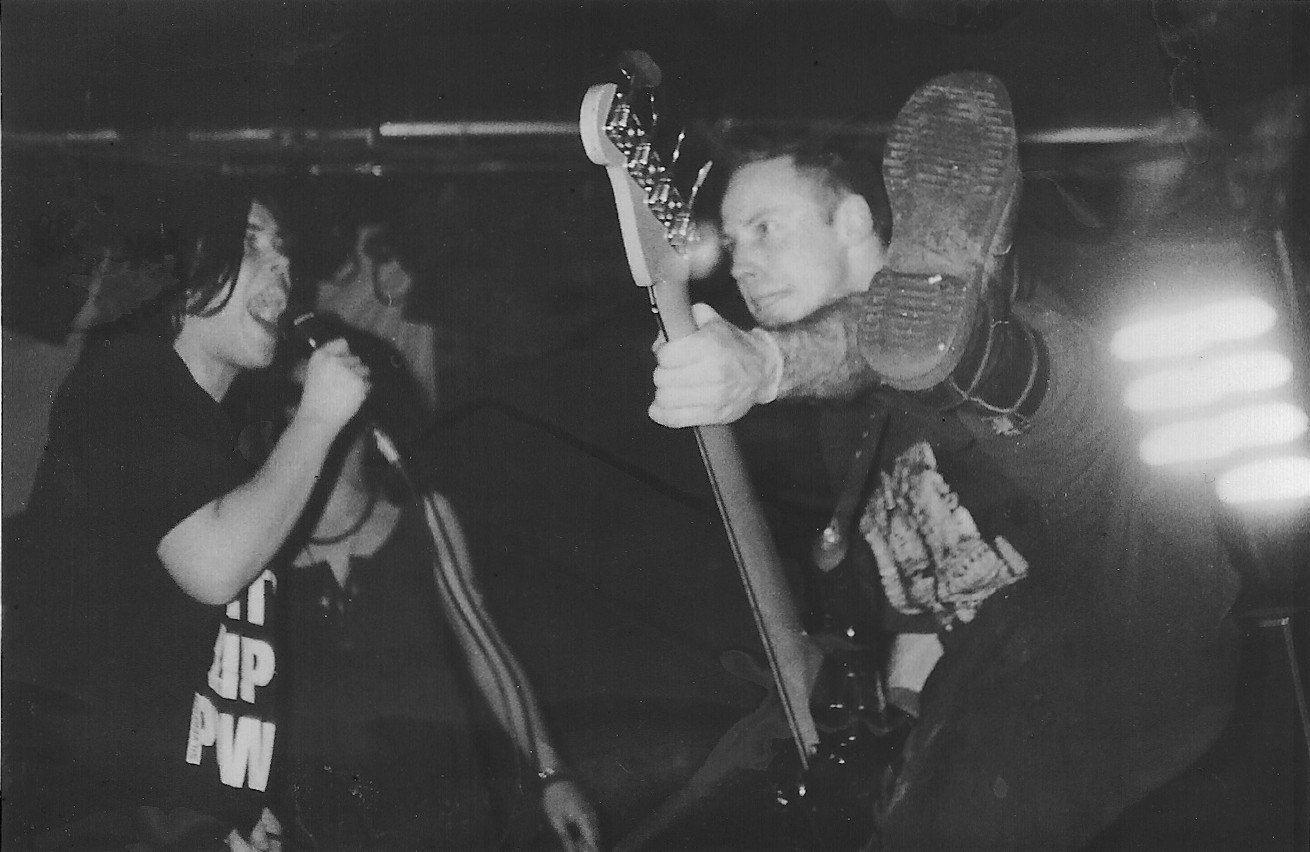
Silverfish (1991)

Silverfish were a UK-based indie rock band which formed in the late 1980s and first performed in Camden in 1988. The band split up in 1993.

Their lead singer was Scottish-born Lesley Rankine. The band had a high octane, indie punk metal sound. Famous lyrics "Hips, Tits, Lips, Power" from the single "Big Bad Baby Pig Squeal" adorned a popular T-shirt of the time.

The other members of the band were; guitarist Andrew "Fuzz" Duprey; bassist Chris P Mowforth; and drummer Stuart Watson. Founding member Fuzz was a regular "face" at London indie gigs of the time, and is now a regular DJ at the Dublin Castle pub in Camden Town, London. The band stood out from many of their scene-contemporaries with a lineup that was mixed in terms of both gender and ethnicity and a setlist that was more liberally strewn with expletives than that of anyone else. Silverfish were the main focus of the so-called 'Camden Lurch' scene, a term invented by the music press to describe the fact that many of the prominent indie bands (outside of the dominant alternative dance and shoegazing scenes) of the time resided in Camden, and that they lurched.

The band's 1980s EPs were collected in a 1990 compilation album called Cockeye. The following year, they released their debut album, Fat Axl, and toured with the band Pigface. In 1992, the group gained wider acclaim with their second album, Organ Fan, and supported the band 7 Year Bitch. During the broadcast of a Peel session, BBC Radio 1 DJ John Peel summed up their level of success: "If they were from New York, we'd be mad for them of course".

When the band split up in 1993, Rankine moved to Seattle and formed the band Ruby with Mark Walk.

== Discography ==
=== Albums ===
- Fat Axl (1991)
- Organ Fan (1992) – UK No. 65

=== Compilations ===
- Cockeye (1990) [includes Dolly Parton & T.F.A.]

=== EPs ===
- Silverfish E.P (1989) UK No. 164 (charted 1993)
- T.F.A. (1990)
- Fuckin' Driving or What? E.P. (1991) UK No. 101
- Silverfish with Scrambled Eggs E.P. (1992) UK No. 82
- Damn Fine E.P. (1993) UK No. 80
