= Blood for Irina =

- Directed by: Chris Alexander
- Written by: Chris Alexander
- Produced by: Chris Alexander; David Goodfellow
- Cinematography: Chris Alexander; David Goodfellow
- Edited by: Chris Alexander
- Music by: Chris Alexander
- Production company: Autonomy Pictures
- Distributed by: Autonomy Pictures
- Release date: November 2, 2012 (Belgium)
- Running time: 70 minutes
- Country: United States
- Language: English

Blood for Irina is a 2012 vampire film written and directed by Fangoria editor and film critic Chris Alexander, who also helped to create the film's score. The film had a mixed critical reception. The film released on November 2, 2012, in Belgium. A sequel, entitled Queen of Blood, released in 2014. A third Irina film called Blood Dynasty released through Castle Films in 2017.

== Synopsis ==
Irina is a century old vampire that is reaching the end of her existence. She's watched over by the motel manager, who is obsessed with the need to keep Irina safe. Also close by is a wretched prostitute who might be in a worse situation than Irina is in herself.

== Cast ==
- Shauna Henry as Irina
- Carrie Gemmell as Pink
- David Goodfellow as Man
- Andre Becker as Victim
- Mark Goodfellow as Child
- Jason Tannis as Monster

== Reception ==
Critical reception has been mixed, with many of the reviewers commenting that the film would not appeal to all audiences. HorrorNews.net gave a mixed review for Blood for Irina, calling it an "immersive experience" while also criticizing the director's choice to have minimal dialogue, as it "really makes [the story] hard to follow after a while". In contrast, Diabolique Magazine gave a more favorable review for the movie, saying that it "may not appeal to every type of horror fan, but those versed in artsy European vampire films, or those at least curious, should find plenty to appreciate here."

== Sequel ==
In 2013 Alexander announced his intent to film a sequel to Blood for Irina, which would be titled Queen of Blood. Shauna Henry reprised her role as Irina and the film also features Nivek Ogre. The movie is set in the Wild West and it was released on 13 August 2014 at the Montreal HorrorFest.
