= The Process (collective) =

Art collective

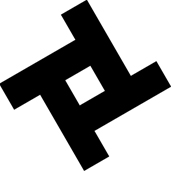
The Process Logo, or P-Cross

The Process was an art and philosophy collective formed in the early 1990s and birthed at the same time as, and with a subset of the same people from, the studio work for the Skinny Puppy album The Process. Early contributors included Nivek Ogre, Genesis P-Orridge, William Morrison, and Loki der Quaeler. The Process collective aimed to connect the international industrial music community via the nascent internet while ostensibly reviving the "deviant psychotherapy cult" Process Church of the Final Judgement.

== Logo ==
The Process Cross — formed by the overlapping of four instances of the letter P - was borrowed from The Process Church of the Final Judgement (Process Church) and appears on albums by Ministry and the Skinny Puppy/Throbbing Gristle collaboration Puppy Gristle. The Process Cross also appears in several Skinny Puppy music videos. Director William Morrison has the symbol tattooed on his forearm; musician Genesis P-Orridge and Satanic Temple founder Lucien Greaves bear the mark on their biceps.

In 1993 Morrison received a cease-and-desist letter from lawyers representing Chase Bank, claiming the bank owned the copyright to The Process' logo. Morrison suggested the lawyers obtain a copy of a book written by William Sims Bainbridge in 1978, titled Satan's Power: A Deviant Psychotherapy Cult, which would definitively prove The Process Church of the Final Judgement held the copyright. Morrison did not hear back from the lawyers.

== Initiating The Process ==
In 1992, Rick Rubin invited Skinny Puppy (and their entourage) to reside at the Shangri-La recording studio in Malibu, California, while creating their first album for American Recordings. Genesis P-Orridge was enlisted to work on the project. During a brainstorming session on potential concepts for the album, P-Orridge produced copies of a magazine produced by the Process Church titled Love, Sex, Death, and Fear. Morrison recalls himself and Ordo Templi Orientis member Adam Rostoker (Adam Walks Between Worlds) as immediately excited by the material. Nivek Ogre was also intrigued.

Although The Process Church of the Final Judgement is credited as the conceptual inspiration for The Process collective, members have cited media theorist Marshall McLuhan and cultural critic Neil Postman as influences, stating that the collective was looking to explore media technologies and their impact on culture.

== Thee Process IS... ==
"We all felt we had found our muse. Genesis, Adam Rostoker (Adam Walks Between Worlds) and I penned the original Thee Process IS... document and sent it out into the world causing mass confusion within our sphere. American Recordings got on board and released to the press..."

— William Morrison, The Process is...(www.process.org)

"The Process is a collaboration ov Individuals. We fight all forms ov restriction to realise thee potential ov thee human brain through a system ov pagan Magick. It exists devoid ov dogma, be it political or religious. Information is shared amongst those involved, not in order to be treated as instruction but rather as a means to promote participation, discipline and contribution to an ideal as opposed to self-ambition. Thee recognition that only truth counts. Rituals (sigils) are employed as a means ov discovering one's true psyche, desires (and their realisation), integrating thee conscious and subconscious as a way to produce a spiritually whole person as opposed to a fragmented shell. The Process attempts to wake people up to thee fact that they are controlled, socially programmed to suit those with an interest in control, and that guilt and fear are weapons employed to suppress natural advancement. Preconceptions must be swept aside and a de-programming occur until fearless and guiltless sexuality is mastered. The Process embraces suitable forms ov technology to support its aims for collective advancement. Methods ov information access include recordings, booklists, video deprogramming transmissions. These are all designed to surprise, even shock, but with a view to expansion, thee removal ov limitation."

— Father Malachi, Thee Process IS...

The manifesto promotes the use of chaos magic, sigils, trance, and the cut-up technique to unleash powers suppressed by various manifestations of social control. William S. Burroughs, Robert Anton Wilson, Aleister Crowley, Thelema, and the 23 enigma are referenced; many of the ideas articulated are a rehash of Genesis P-Orridge's previous work with Thee Temple ov Psychick Youth. Neo-pagan attitudes and Buddhist references also permeate the syncretic text. Transmission of The Process is described as analogous to that of the zen koan and is described as the "idealized Hidden Instrument of Evolution". Deprogramming, the fulfillment of one's True Will, the liberation of sexuality, and the subversion/dissembling of Control (in the Burroughsian sense) are addressed in the document. Ideas borrowed from anarchism, such as mutuality and decentralization, get play as well. The Process is self-described as a "non-organization" recognizing "thee reality ov Individuals", consciously formulated to look appear as a cult to the mainstream. The Process sees itself as "sucksessors" to the hippies and surrealists and claims to have "bases" in UK, Holland, Germany, Sweden, Canada, and America. The document is attributed to Father Malachi. Strangely, there are no overt references to Process Church of the Final Judgement.

The Process on the Skinny Puppy album of the same name presents a summarized version of the doctrine. In a 1998 interview with Philip H. Farber, Nivek Ogre talks about the project, saying::

"It was, in essence, a bit of Magick 101, in a lot of ways. We worked out a doctrine and put something up and from all of that, something was woken. Something rose up and came back to meet the call. That was really interesting. It was probably one of the most interesting projects I've done in my life. To this day, it's still one of the most interesting. I still delve into, and I still have contacts from that and I still utilize that whole experience. It was incredible."

== Online presence ==
Information about The Process was initially communicated across Usenet by its founding members, who encouraged people to upload their various media files for collaboration via anonymous FTP. Later, a mailing list was created, but without direct participation by Ogre or Genesis. The Process FTP was initially located at the address ftp.netcom.com directory pub/puppy. The group was then afforded its own server space and listproc at USC, by Robert Engen, with the address process.usc.edu. In 1995, internet efforts not involving the listproc had their own domain: process.org. According to Morrison, process.org went live the day the World Wide Web came online and was accessible with the original Mosaic (web browser). Loki der Quaeler is credited with pioneering The Process' process.org web presence. The original process.org server was a NeXTstation stored in a closet in Vancouver, BC; the location and internet connection were provided by Blacky.

Several gatherings of participants took place in 1997 and 1998 at primarily East Coast locations. During the last years of the decade, community activity dwindled and the website was eventually retired. Creative spin-offs and independent projects were launched around roughly the same time frame, drawing many participants in new directions and away from the collective. In this period, a number of original members of the Process Church contacted some of the early contributors of the collective and the Process Church members were subsequently provided with their own webspace on the Process server from March 1997 until May 2001.

== Since 2000 ==
In 2000, Genesis premiered a short film entitled The Process is the Product. It was prepared from multimedia material created by Process Media Labs during the early years of The Process.

Several members of the original collective are prominent members of The Satanic Temple and have cited The Process as a having greater influence on the TST vision and structure than the "self-centered" philosophy of Anton LaVey and The Church of Satan.
