= Ruby (British band) =

Scottish electronic music act

- Origin: London, England
- Genres: Trip hop, industrial, electronic
- Years active: 1994–present
- Labels: WORK/Creation; Epic; Wichita; Thirsty Ear
- Members: Lesley Rankine
- Past members: Mark Walk; Chris Taplin; Gavin Fawcett; Regina Chellew; Sharon Dougherty

Ruby are a Scottish electronic music act that was formed as a collaboration between singer Lesley Rankine and multi-instrumentalist Mark Walk in 1994, and is now positioned as a solo vehicle for Rankine. Ruby's sound includes electronic, trip hop, noise, industrial, and jazz, among others. Rankine and Walk named the group Ruby after learning that this was the name of both their maternal grandmothers.

== History ==
Scottish singer Lesley Rankine (born April 11, 1965) began her music career as frontwoman for the London garage-psych band The Grizzelders, recording one cassette-only release called Making It Real Gear. She then formed the noise rock band Silverfish, leaving the group after the release of their 1993 LP Organ Fan and then departing for Seattle. She also appeared on the Toronto-based Monster Voodoo Machine's Suffersystem album recorded in 1994 at Chicago Trax; this album won a Juno Award.

Rankine had previously worked with producer/multi-instrumentalist Mark Walk on material for industrial group Pigface. The two rejoined forces in Seattle and formed Ruby as an electronic project exploring downtempo styles, especially trip hop. Ruby released the album Salt Peter in 1995. Salt Peter's first single was "Paraffin"; the compilation New Voices Vol. 3 from Rolling Stone had this song as its second track. Ruby's best known song, "Tiny Meat", was the album's second single and was the only song by the band to chart in the United States, reaching #22 on the Modern Rock Tracks list. This song was also included in the compilation MTV Fresh 2. Another single, "Hoops" came out in early 1996. The previously unreleased song "This Is" was on the soundtrack to the film The Cable Guy in May 1996. The CD single for the song "Paraffin" included a remix called "Harpie Mix" which was also on the soundtrack to the 1997 movie The Beautician and the Beast.

Walk did not participate in a world tour to promote Salt Peter; instead Rankine sang with a full live band including Chris Taplin on bass/guitar, Gavin Fawcett on drums, and Sharon Dougherty on keyboards/guitar (replaced by Regina Chellew mid tour). A remix album, Revenge, the Sweetest Fruit, appeared in 1996, with a UK version titled Stroking the Full Length following a few months later. "Flippin' tha Bird (Ceasefire Remix)" was included on the soundtrack to the 1997 film Nowhere. In 1996 Rankine joined Tom Jones for a cover of the song "Kung Fu Fighting", and later recorded a one-minute version of Lerner and Loewe's "Thank Heaven for Little Girls" for a Samuel Bayer-directed Mountain Dew commercial in which she also appeared.

Rankine then moved to New Orleans, Louisiana, but only stayed only six months due to events including a rash of car-jackings and hold-ups in the surrounding areas, and the murder of a woman in the garden across from her home. When Rankine learned that the killer had deposited the victim's clothing in her garbage as they left the scene, she left New Orleans within five days for Seattle to start recording Ruby's second album. Most of Short-Staffed at the Gene Pool was finished by August 1998 and nearly completed by Rankine in her native Scotland throughout 1999. The album was released in 2001; a supporting tour was hampered when effects equipment was lost. For a short time Ruby collaborated with former Creation label members Mark Bowen and Dick Green, but by March 2008 no further recordings had been released. Rankine took a break from recording, returning to her home country. By this time Walk had become a member of Skinny Puppy.

In December 2012, Rankine announced on her Facebook page that she was working on new music and videos under the Ruby name. In 2013, she released the EP Revert to Type, followed by the album Waiting for Light in 2014. Another EP, Type-Cast, was released in 2016.

== Discography ==
Studio albums

- Salt Peter (1995)
- Short-Staffed at the Gene Pool (2001)
- Revert to Type (EP, 2013)
- Waiting for Light (2014)
- Type-Case (EP, 2016)
