= Public Image Ltd discography =

- Studio albums: 10
- Live albums: 7
- Compilation albums: 4
- Singles: 24
- Video albums: 3
- Box sets: 8

This is the discography of British post-punk band Public Image Ltd.

== Albums ==
=== Studio albums ===
Title	Album details	Peak chart positions						
Title	Album details	UK	UK Indie	AUS	CAN	NL	NZ	US
Public Image: First Issue	Released: 8 December 1978; Label: Virgin; Formats: LP, MC	22	—	77	—	—	18	—
Metal Box	Released: 23 November 1979; Label: Virgin; Formats: 3×12", MC; Reissued in 1980 as Second Edition on 2×LP and MC	18	—	—	—	—	21	171
The Flowers of Romance	Released: 10 April 1981; Label: Virgin, Warner Bros.; Formats: LP, MC	11	—	94	—	—	33	114
This Is What You Want... This Is What You Get	Released: 1 July 1984; Label: Virgin, Elektra; Formats: LP, MC	56	—	—	—	—	—	—
Album	Released: 27 January 1986; Label: Virgin, Elektra; Formats: CD, LP, MC; The cassette release was titled Cassette and the CD release was titled Compact Disc	14	—	59	95	35	34	115
Happy?	Released: 14 September 1987; Label: Virgin; Formats: CD, LP, MC	40	—	—	—	—	—	169
9	Released: 10 May 1989; Label: Virgin; Formats: CD, LP, MC	36	—	57	—	—	—	106
That What Is Not	Released: 10 February 1992; Label: Virgin; Formats: CD, LP, MC	46	—	—	—	—	—	—
This Is PiL	Released: 28 May 2012; Label: PiL Official; Formats: CD, CD+DVD, 2×LP, digital download	35	4	—	—	—	—	—
What the World Needs Now...	Released: 4 September 2015; Label: PiL Official; Formats: CD, 2×LP, digital download	29	3	—	—	—	—	—
End of World	Released: 11 August 2023; Label: PiL Official	33	4	—	—	—	—	—
"—" denotes releases that did not chart or were not released in that territory.

=== Live albums ===
Title	Album details	Peak chart positions
Title	Album details	UK
Paris au Printemps	Released: 14 November 1980; Label: Virgin; Formats: LP, MC	61
Live in Tokyo	Released: August 1983; Label: Virgin; Formats: 2x12", MC	28
ALiFE 2009	Released: 21 December 2009; Label: Concert Live; Formats: 3xCD	—
Live at the Isle of Wight Festival 2011	Released: 19 September 2011; Label: Concert Live; Formats: 2xCD, digital download	—
Live at Rockpalast 1983	Released: 27 January 2012; Label: MIG; Formats: CD, 3x12"	—
Live at O_{2} Shepherd's Bush Empire	Released: 2 October 2015; Label: Concert Live; Formats: 3xCD	—
Concert – Live at the Brixton Academy 27.5.86	Released: 21 April 2018; Label: Virgin/UMC; Formats: 2xLP	—
"—" denotes releases that did not chart or were not released in that territory.

=== Compilation albums ===
Title	Album details	Peak chart positions	
Title	Album details	UK	AUS
The Greatest Hits, So Far	Released: 24 September 1990; Label: Virgin; Formats: CD, 2xLP, MC	20	102
First Issue / Second Edition	Released: 2003; Label: Virgin; Formats: 2xCD	—	—
Gold	Released: 2 December 2013; Label: Universal Music; Formats: 2xCD	—	—
Rise – The Collection	Released: 25 May 2015; Label: Spectrum Music; Formats: CD, digital download	—	—
"—" denotes releases that did not chart or were not released in that territory.

=== Box sets ===
Title	Album details
Box	Released: 1990; Label: Virgin; Formats: 3xCD
PiL CD Box Vol. 1	Released: 10 December 1991; Label: Columbia; Formats: 5xCD; Japan-only release
PiL CD Box Vol. 2	Released: 21 December 1991; Label: Columbia; Formats: 5xCD; Japan-only release
Plastic Box	Released: March 1999; Label: Virgin; Formats: 4xCD
5 Album Set	Released: 2 April 2013; Label: EMI; Formats: 5xCD; Australia-only release
The Ultimate Live Collection Vol. 1	Released: December 2015; Label: Concert Live; Formats: 6xCD; Limited release
The Ultimate Live Collection Vol. 2	Released: December 2015; Label: Concert Live; Formats: 6xCD; Limited release
The Public Image Is Rotten – Songs from the Heart	Released: 20 July 2018; Label: Virgin/UMC; Formats: 5xCD+2xDVD, 6xLP, digital download

=== Video albums ===
Title	Album details
PIL Live	Released: 1983; Label: Virgin; Formats: VHS, Betamax, LaserDisc
Videos	Released: June 1986; Label: Virgin; Formats: VHS, Betamax
Live at Rockpalast 1983	Released: 27 January 2012; Label: MIG; Formats: DVD

=== Other albums ===
Title	Album details
Commercial Zone	Released: 30 January 1984; Label: PiL; Formats: LP; US-only unofficial release by Keith Levene featuring early recordings of songs from This Is What You Want... This Is What You Get

== Singles ==
Title	Year	Peak chart positions									Album
Title	Year	UK	AUS	BEL (WA)	GER	IRE	NL	NZ	US Alt	US Dance	Album
"Public Image"	1978	9	—	—	—	15	—	—	x	—	Public Image: First Issue
"Death Disco"	1979	20	—	—	—	—	—	—	x	—	Metal Box
"Memories"	1979	60	—	—	—	—	—	—	x	56	Metal Box
"Flowers of Romance"	1981	24	—	—	—	19	—	—	x	51	The Flowers of Romance
"This Is Not a Love Song"	1983	5	17	20	10	3	12	45	x	—	This Is What You Want... This Is What You Get
"Bad Life"	1984	71	—	—	—	—	—	—	x	—	This Is What You Want... This Is What You Get
"Rise"	1986	11	37	35	—	10	—	29	x	30	Album
"Home"	1986	75	—	—	—	—	—	—	x	30	Album
"Seattle"	1987	47	—	—	—	—	—	—	x	30	Happy?
"The Body"	1987	100	—	—	—	—	—	—	x	30	Happy?
"Disappointed"	1989	38	94	—	—	—	—	—	1	26	9
"Warrior"	1989	89	114	—	—	—	—	—	16	16	9
"Happy" (US promo-only release)	1989	—	—	—	—	—	—	—	15	16	9
"Don't Ask Me"	1990	22	139	—	—	—	—	—	2	—	The Greatest Hits, So Far
"Cruel"	1992	49	87	—	—	—	—	—	—	—	That What Is Not
"Covered" (US promo-only release)	1992	—	—	—	—	—	—	—	11	—	That What Is Not
"Acid Drops" (US promo-only release)	1992	—	—	—	—	—	—	—	29	—	That What Is Not
"The Order of Death" (The Blair Witch Mix; US and Canada promo-only release)	1999	—	—	—	—	—	—	—	—	—	The Blair Witch Project – Josh's Blair Witch Mix
"Religion" (vs Psycho Radio; Italy-only release)	2006	—	—	—	—	—	—	—	—	—	Non-album single
"One Drop"	2012	—	—	—	—	—	—	—	—	—	This Is PiL
"Reggie Song" / "Out of the Woods"	2012	—	—	—	—	—	—	—	—	—	This Is PiL
"Double Trouble"	2015	—	—	—	—	—	—	—	—	—	What the World Needs Now...
"The One"	2015	—	—	—	—	—	—	—	—	—	What the World Needs Now...
"Bettie Page"	2015	—	—	—	—	—	—	—	—	—	What the World Needs Now...
"Hawaii"	2023	—	—	—	—	—	—	—	—	—	End of World
"Penge"	2023	—	—	—	—	—	—	—	—	—	End of World
"—" denotes releases that did not chart or were not released in that territory. "x" denotes chart did not exist at the time.
