= List of Public Image Ltd members =

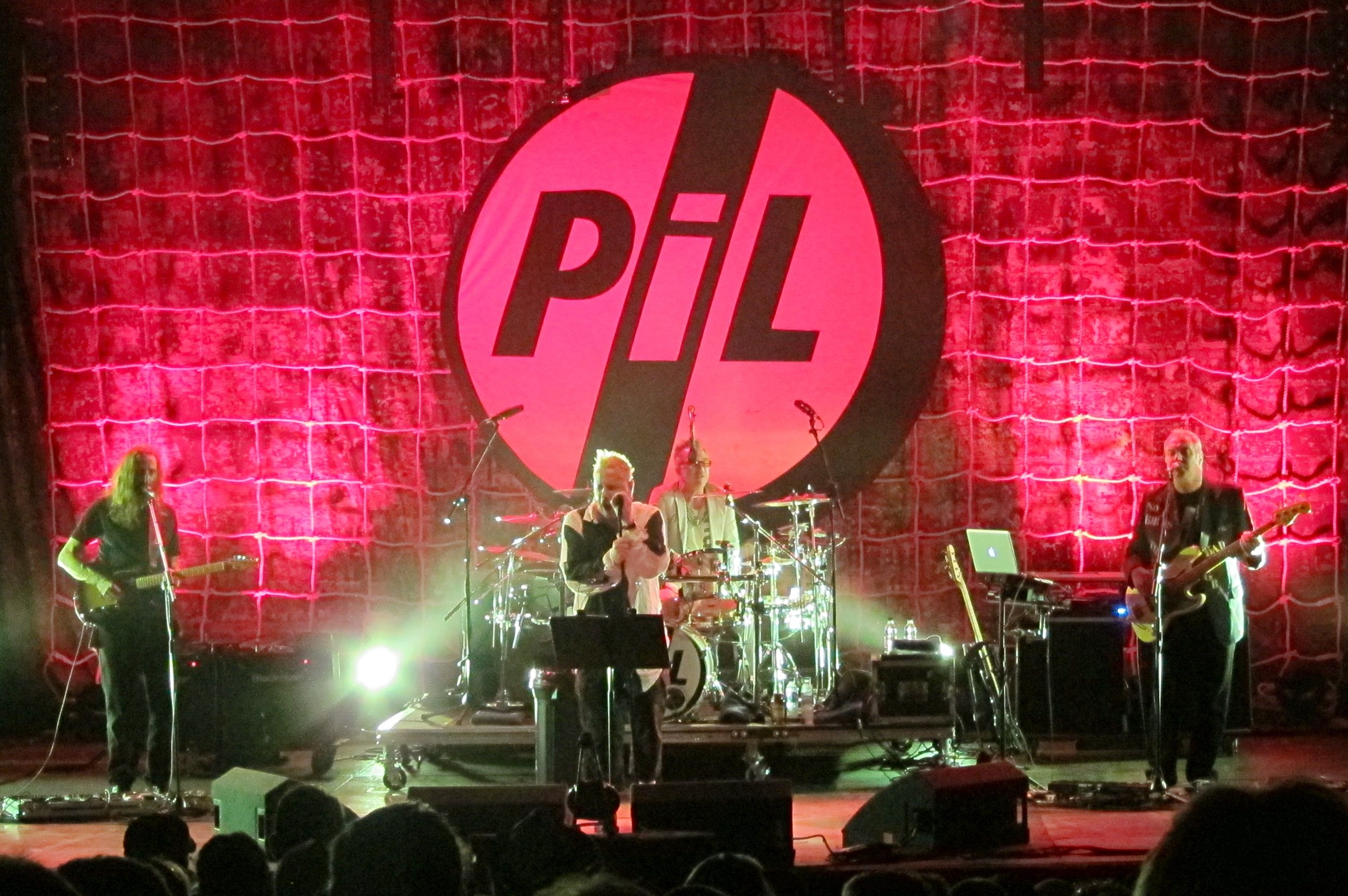
Public Image Ltd performing in 2012.

Public Image Ltd are an English post-punk band from London. Formed in 1978, the group originally consisted of vocalist John Lydon, guitarist Keith Levene, bassist Jah Wobble (real name John Wardle) and drummer Jim Walker. The group's current lineup, reformed since 2009, includes Lydon alongside guitarist Robert "Lu" Edmonds (originally a member from 1986 to 1988), bassist Scott Firth (a new member) and drummer Mark Roberts (since 2025).

== History ==
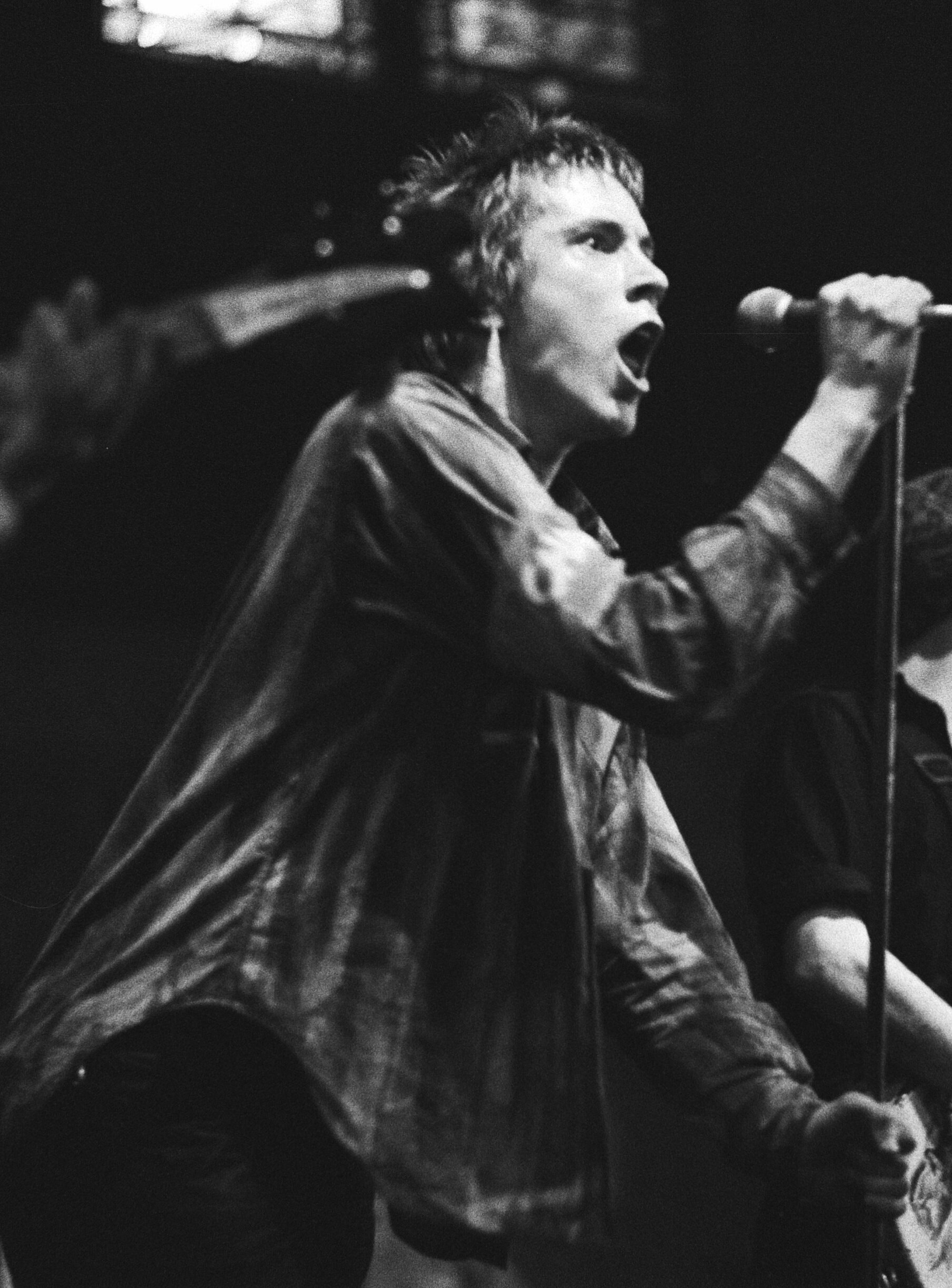
John Lydon formed Public Image Ltd in May 1978 after leaving the Sex Pistols that January.

=== 1978–1981 ===
The first incarnation of Public Image Ltd (PiL) – consisting of John Lydon, Keith Levene, Jah Wobble and Jim Walker – was completed and began rehearsing in May 1978. The band released their debut album Public Image: First Issue before the end of the year, shortly after which Walker left the band due to financial and personal concerns. He was replaced by a succession of drummers: first Vivian Jackson in January 1979, followed by Eddie Edwards and David Humphrey in February, Richard Dudanski in April, Karl Burns in September, and finally Martin Atkins in October. The band's second album Metal Box, released in November, featured performances by Humphrey, Dudanski and Atkins. A year later, the group released their first live album Paris au Printemps, recorded at the beginning of 1980.

By June 1980, Atkins had left PiL to focus on his solo project, Brian Brain. He was followed the next month by Jah Wobble. Later that summer, Lydon and Levene recorded new track "Pied Piper" with brief second guitarist Steve "Shooz" New (later known as Stella Nova), which was released on the Virgin Records sampler Machines. Between October and November, the band recorded their third album The Flowers of Romance, for which Atkins returned in a temporary session performer capacity. PiL played one show around the release of the album, on 15 May 1981 at The Ritz in New York City, with Lydon and Levene joined by drummer Solomon "Sam" Ulano, who was brought in solely for the gig. The performance was cut short due to audience unrest, which then escalated into a riot.

=== 1981–1986 ===
After no activity for the rest of 1981, PiL resurfaced in early 1982 to announce the addition of keyboardist Ken Lockie. By May, the band had been rejoined by former drummer Martin Atkins. In August, Atkins' Brian Brain bandmate Pete Jones joined on bass, which also prompted the departure of Lockie. Recordings from this period, initially intended to make up PiL's fourth album, were independently released by Levene in 1984 as Commercial Zone. After a show in April 1983, Jones left the band. He was quickly replaced by Louis Bernardi. Just a month later, Levene also departed, leaving Lydon as the sole remaining original member. For a Japanese tour starting that month, guitarist Joe Guida and keyboardist Tommy Zvoncheck were brought in.

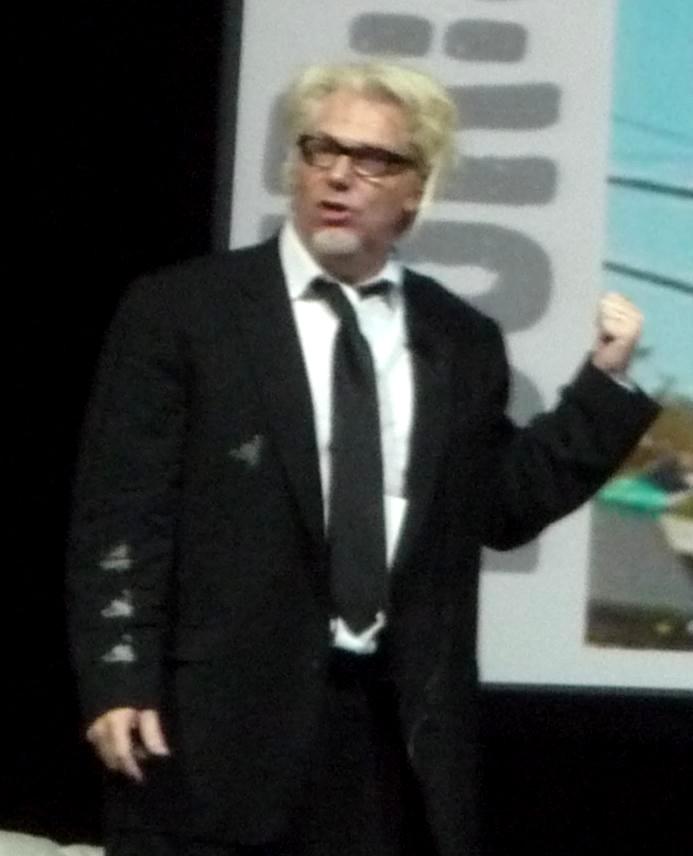
Martin Atkins, PiL drummer from 1979 to 1980, rejoined the band in 1982 and remained until 1985.

In September, Zvoncheck was replaced by Arthur Stead, and the group continued touring until the end of the year. During early 1984, Lydon and Atkins (with session contributors) finished working on the band's fourth album, which was released in July as This Is What You Want... This Is What You Get. By the autumn, PiL had returned to touring, introducing a new lineup featuring guitarist Mark Schulz, bassist Bret Helm and keyboardist Jebin Bruni. The group toured until January 1985, after which they entered another period of inactivity which included Atkins leaving for a second time that summer. Later in the year, Lydon and the rest of the touring band members began working on a new album with producer Bill Laswell. However, due to the musicians' lack of studio experience, and Laswell's plans, they were replaced with a range of session performers.

=== 1986–1992 ===
After the release of Album in January 1986, a new lineup of PiL was formed with guitarist Kevin Armstrong, guitarist and keyboardist Robert "Lu" Edmonds, bassist Allan Dias, and drummer Bruce Smith; however, when Armstrong pulled out to tour with Iggy Pop, he was replaced with John McGeoch. The new musicians were later made full-time members of the group and recorded Happy? the following year. They continued touring until September 1988, when Edmonds was forced to leave due to hearing problems. After the band released the follow-up album 9 in spring 1989, Ted Chau took over on second guitar and keyboards. By November, he had departed.

In early 1990, Smith also left and the remaining trio recorded "Don't Ask Me" for the compilation The Greatest Hits, So Far. During 1991, the band recorded That What Is Not with two session members: rhythm guitarist Gregg "J.P." Arreguin and drummer Curt "Kirkee B." Bisquera. PiL returned to touring shortly after its release in early 1992, with Ted Chau returning and Mike Joyce joining on drums. During the summer, Dias quit the band suddenly, later recalling that he was "completely burned out" and "had a drug habit". He was replaced for the final run of shows by Russell Webb and the group continued touring until September, after which they went on indefinite hiatus.

=== Since 2009 ===
In September 2009, it was announced that Lydon would be reforming PiL beginning with a short UK tour in December, with the band completed by former members Lu Edmonds (guitar, keyboards) and drummer Bruce Smith (drums), as well as new member Scott Firth (bass, keyboards). ALiFE 2009, recorded at the reunion shows, was released later. In 2012 the group released their first studio album in 20 years, This Is PiL, which was followed in 2015 by What the World Needs Now... In February 2025, the band announced Mark Roberts as their new drummer, following the departure of Smith the previous year.

== Members ==
=== Current ===
Image	Name	Years active	Instruments	Release contributions
	John Lydon	1978–1992; 2009–present	lead vocals; keyboards; synthesisers; violin; saxophone; percussion	all Public Image Ltd (PiL) releases
	Robert "Lu" Edmonds	1986–1988; 2009–present	guitar; saz; banjo; backing vocals; keyboards	Happy? (1987); all PiL releases from ALiFE 2009 (2009) onwards
	Scott Firth	2009–present	bass; keyboards; synthesisers; backing vocals	all PiL releases from ALiFE 2009 (2009) onwards
	Mark Roberts	2025–present	drums	none to date

=== Former ===
Image	Name	Years active	Instruments	Release contributions
	Keith Levene	1978–1983 (died 2022)	guitar; keyboards; synthesisers; percussion; drums; bass (1980–1982, 1983)	all PiL releases from Public Image: First Issue (1978) to The Flowers of Romance (1981)
	John "Jah Wobble" Wardie	1978–1980	bass; piano; drums; backing vocals	Public Image: First Issue (1978); Metal Box (1979); Paris au Printemps (1980)
	Jim Walker	1978–1979	drums	Public Image: First Issue (1978)
	Vivian Jackson	1979	drums	none
	David Humphrey	1979	drums	Metal Box (1979) – two tracks
	Richard Dudanski	1979	drums	Metal Box (1979) – five tracks
	Karl Burns	1979	drums	none
	Martin Atkins	1979–1980; 1982–1985	drums; percussion; keyboards; synthesisers; bass (1982, 1983–1985); guitar (1983–1985)	Metal Box (1979) – one track only; Paris au Printemps (1980); The Flowers of Romance (1981); Live in Tokyo (1983); This Is What You Want... This Is What You Get (1984); Anarchy Movie '85 (1985)
	Steve "Shooz" New (later known as Stella Nova)	1980 (died 2010)	guitar; bass	"Pied Piper" (1980)
	Ken Lockie	1982	keyboards; synthesisers	none
	Pete Jones	1982–1983	bass	Commercial Zone (1984)
	Bruce Smith	1986–1990; 2009–2024	drums; programming; percussion; backing vocals	all PiL releases from Happy? (1987) onwards, except That What Is Not (1992)
	Allan Dias	1986–1992	bass; backing vocals; keyboards	all PiL releases from Happy? (1987) to That What Is Not (1992)
	Kevin Armstrong	1986	lead guitar	none
	John McGeoch	1986–1992 (died 2004)	lead guitar	all PiL releases from Happy? (1987) to That What Is Not (1992)
	Ted Chau	1989; 1992	rhythm guitar; keyboards; backing vocals	none
	Mike Joyce	1992	drums	none
	Russell Webb	1992	bass; backing vocals	none

=== Touring ===
Image	Name	Years active	Instruments	Details
	Solomon "Sam" Ulano	1981 (one-off) (died 2014)	drums	Ulano was brought in for a one-off PiL performance at the Ritz in New York City on 15 May 1981.
	Louis Bernardi	1983	bass	Bernardi was brought in after Pete Jones' departure, and later contributed to This Is What You Want...
	Joe Guida	1983	guitar	Guida and Zvoncheck also performed on the band's 1983 tour, featured on the album Live in Tokyo.
	Tommy Zvoncheck	1983	keyboards	Guida and Zvoncheck also performed on the band's 1983 tour, featured on the album Live in Tokyo.
	Arthur Stead	1983	keyboards	Stead took over keyboards from Zvoncheck from September to the end of a tour in December 1983.
	Mark Schulz	1984–1985	lead guitar	After the release of 1984's This Is What You Want..., Schulz, Helm and Bruni joined PiL's touring lineup.
	Bret Helm	1984–1985	bass	After the release of 1984's This Is What You Want..., Schulz, Helm and Bruni joined PiL's touring lineup.
	Jebin Bruni	1984–1985	keyboards; rhythm guitar	After the release of 1984's This Is What You Want..., Schulz, Helm and Bruni joined PiL's touring lineup.

== Lineups ==
Period	Members	Releases
May 1978 – January 1979	John Lydon – lead vocals, piano; Keith Levene – guitar, synthesisers; Jah Wobble – bass, piano, backing vocals; Jim Walker – drums	Public Image: First Issue (1978)
January 1979	John Lydon – lead vocals, piano; Keith Levene – guitar, synthesisers; Jah Wobble – bass, piano, backing vocals; Vivian Jackson – drums	none
February 1979	John Lydon – lead vocals, piano; Keith Levene – guitar, synthesisers; Jah Wobble – bass, piano, backing vocals; Eddie Edwards – drums	none
February – March 1979	John Lydon – lead vocals, piano; Keith Levene – guitar, synthesisers; Jah Wobble – bass, piano, backing vocals; David Humphrey – drums	Metal Box (1979) – two tracks
March – April 1979	John Lydon – lead vocals, piano; Keith Levene – guitar, synthesisers, drums; Jah Wobble – bass, piano, backing vocals, drums	Metal Box (1979) – three tracks
April – September 1979	John Lydon – lead vocals, piano; Keith Levene – guitar, synthesisers; Jah Wobble – bass, piano, backing vocals; Richard Dudanski – drums	Metal Box (1979) – five tracks
September 1979	John Lydon – lead vocals, piano; Keith Levene – guitar, synthesisers; Jah Wobble – bass, piano, backing vocals; Karl Burns – drums	none
October 1979 – June 1980	John Lydon – lead vocals, piano; Keith Levene – guitar, synthesisers; Jah Wobble – bass, piano, backing vocals; Martin Atkins – drums, synthesisers	Metal Box (1979) – one track; Paris au Printemps (1980)
June – July 1980	John Lydon – lead vocals, piano; Keith Levene – guitar, synthesisers, drums; Jah Wobble – bass, piano, backing vocals, drums	none
Late summer 1980	John Lydon – vocals, violin, saxophone; Keith Levene – guitar, synthesisers, drums, bass; Steve New – guitar, bass	"Pied Piper" (1980)
October – November 1980	John Lydon – vocals, violin, saxophone; Keith Levene – guitar, bass, synthesisers, drums; Martin Atkins – drums, synthesisers (session)	The Flowers of Romance (1981)
15 May 1981 (one live performance)	John Lydon – vocals, violin, saxophone; Keith Levene – guitar, bass, synthesisers; Sam Ulano – drums (temporary stand-in)	none
January – May 1982	John Lydon – vocals, synthesisers, violin; Keith Levene – guitar, bass, synthesisers, drums; Ken Lockie – keyboards, synthesisers	none
May – August 1982	John Lydon – vocals, synthesisers, violin; Keith Levene – guitar, bass, synthesisers; Martin Atkins – drums, percussion, bass; Ken Lockie – keyboards, synthesisers	none
August 1982 – April 1983	John Lydon – vocals, synthesisers, violin; Keith Levene – guitar, synthesisers; Pete Jones – bass; Martin Atkins – drums, percussion, synthesisers	Commercial Zone (1984)
April – May 1983	John Lydon – vocals, synthesisers, violin; Keith Levene – guitar, synthesisers, bass; Martin Atkins – drums, percussion, synthesisers, bass; Louis Bernardi – bass (touring)	none
June – September 1983	John Lydon – vocals, synthesisers, violin; Martin Atkins – drums, percussion, synthesisers, bass, guitar; Joseph Guida – guitar (touring); Louis Bernardi – bass (touring); Tommy Zvoncheck – keyboards (touring)	Live in Tokyo (1983)
September – December 1983	John Lydon – vocals, synthesisers, violin; Martin Atkins – drums, percussion, synthesisers, bass, guitar; Joseph Guida – guitar (touring); Louis Bernardi – bass (touring); Arthur Stead – keyboards (touring)	none
Early – summer 1984	John Lydon – vocals, synthesisers, violin; Martin Atkins – drums, percussion, synthesisers, bass, guitar	This Is What You Want... This Is What You Get (1984)
Autumn 1984 – June 1985	John Lydon – vocals, synthesisers, violin; Martin Atkins – drums, percussion, synthesisers, bass, guitar; Mark Schulz – lead guitar (touring); Bret Helm – bass (touring); Jebin Bruni – keyboards, rhythm guitar (touring)	Anarchy Movie '85 (1985)
June – autumn 1985	John Lydon – vocals, synthesisers, violin; Mark Schulz – lead guitar (touring); Bret Helm – bass (touring); Jebin Bruni – keyboards, rhythm guitar (touring)	none
Autumn 1985 – early 1986	John Lydon – vocals	Album (1986)
February – March 1986	John Lydon – lead vocals; Kevin Armstrong – lead guitar; Lu Edmonds – rhythm guitar, keyboards, backing vocals; Allan Dias – bass, backing vocals; Bruce Smith – drums, percussion	none
March 1986 – September 1988	John Lydon – lead vocals; John McGeoch – lead guitar; Lu Edmonds – rhythm guitar, keyboards, backing vocals; Allan Dias – bass, backing vocals; Bruce Smith – drums, percussion	Happy? (1987)
September 1988 – spring 1989	John Lydon – lead vocals; John McGeoch – guitar; Allan Dias – bass, backing vocals; Bruce Smith – drums, percussion	9 (1989)
Spring – November 1989	John Lydon – lead vocals; John McGeoch – lead guitar; Ted Chau – rhythm guitar, keyboards, backing vocals; Allan Dias – bass, backing vocals; Bruce Smith – drums, percussion	none
Early 1990 – January 1992	John Lydon – lead vocals; John McGeoch – guitar; Allan Dias – bass, keyboards, backing vocals	"Don't Ask Me" (1990); "Criminal" (1991); That What Is Not (1992)
January – July 1992	John Lydon – lead vocals; John McGeoch – lead guitar; Ted Chau – rhythm guitar, keyboards, backing vocals; Allan Dias – bass, backing vocals; Mike Joyce – drums	none
July – September 1992	John Lydon – lead vocals; John McGeoch – lead guitar; Ted Chau – rhythm guitar, keyboards, backing vocals; Russell Webb – bass, backing vocals; Mike Joyce – drums	none
Band inactive September 1992 – September 2009
September 2009 – late 2024	John Lydon – lead vocals; Lu Edmonds – guitar, keyboards, backing vocals; Scott Firth – bass, keyboards, backing vocals; Bruce Smith – drums, percussion, backing vocals	ALiFE 2009 (2009); Live at the Isle of Wight Festival (2011); This Is PiL (2012); What the World Needs Now... (2015); Live at O2 Shepherd's Bush Empire (2015); End of World (2023)
February 2025 – present	John Lydon – lead vocals; Lu Edmonds – guitar, keyboards, backing vocals; Scott Firth – bass, keyboards, backing vocals; Mark Roberts – drums	none to date
