= Plastic Box =

Box set by Public Image Ltd
- Released: 1999
- Recorded: July 1978–1991
- Genres: Post-punk, experimental rock, alternative rock, alternative dance
- Label: Virgin Records
- Producer: various

Public Image Ltd chronology
That What Is Not (1992)	Plastic Box (1999)	ALiFE (2009)

Professional ratings
Review scores
Source	Rating
AllMusic	4/5 stars
Classic Rock	8/10 stars
Uncut	5/5 stars

Plastic Box is a compilation box set by the post-punk band Public Image Ltd released in 1999 as a limited edition, but re-released for a standard release on 14 December 2009. It comprises four discs covering the band's activity from their debut in 1978 until their hiatus beginning in 1992.

== Packaging and title ==
The album title Plastic Box is a reference to the band's album Metal Box. Both Plastic Box and Metal Box are named simply after the type of packaging; Plastic Box was released in a standard 4CD fatbox case. The album was probably going to be titled differently as the original idea was for the album to be released in a metal box, but the Virgin Records budget was not big enough. The album cover is similar to the band's 1986 album, the title of which originally depended on the format, the most popular title being Album.

== Content ==
- Public Image: First Issue is represented with 7 of its 8 tracks, with only "Fodderstompf" excluded. Also included is "Public Image" B-side "The Cowboy Song".
- Metal Box is represented with 10 of its 12 tracks, four of them are in different versions, three of these in a BBC John Peel session and the remaining track, "Swan Lake", in the form of its 12" remix as "Death Disco". The "Death Disco" B-sides "No Birds Do Sing" and "1/2 Mix"/"Megga Mix" are also included along with "Memories" B-side "Another".
- The Flowers of Romance is represented in its entirety, with the single version of "Flowers of Romance". Also included is "Flowers of Romance" B-side "Home Is Where the Heart Is" and rarity "Pied Piper".
- This Is What You Want... This Is What You Get is represented in its entirety, with a previously unreleased LP remix of "This Is Not a Love Song" and the 7" version of "Bad Life". Other tracks from this era include "Blue Water" and "Bad Life" B-side "Question Mark".
- Album is represented with 6 of its 7 tracks, with only "Bags" excluded.
- Happy? is represented with 3 of its 8 tracks: "Seattle", "Angry" and the US 12" mix of "The Body". Also included is "Seattle" B-side "Selfish Rubbish".
- 9 is represented with 4 of its 10 tracks, with a UK 12" Remix version of "Warrior". "Don't Ask Me", a standalone single from 1990 released to promote The Greatest Hits, So Far, is also included along with "Criminal" from the Point Break soundtrack.
- That What Is Not is represented with 6 of its 10 tracks, 4 of them from a BBC Mark Goodier session.

== Track listing ==
Disc one
No.	Title	Track source	Length
1.	"Public Image"	First Issue
2.	"The Cowboy Song"	Public Image Single B-Side
3.	"Theme"	First Issue
4.	"Religion I"	First Issue
5.	"Religion II"	First Issue
6.	"Annalisa"	First Issue
7.	"Low Life"	First Issue
8.	"Attack"	First Issue
9.	"Poptones" (BBC John Peel Session)
10.	"Careering" (BBC John Peel Session)
11.	"Chant" (BBC John Peel Session)
12.	"Death Disco" (12 Remix)	Death Disco Single A-Side
13.	"1/2 Mix Megamix"	Death Disco Single B-Side
14.	"No Birds Do Sing"	Death Disco Single B-Side
15.	"Memories"	Metal Box

Disc two
No.	Title	Track source	Length
1.	"Another"	Memories Single B-Side
2.	"Albatross"	Metal Box
3.	"Socialist"	Metal Box
4.	"The Suit"	Metal Box
5.	"Bad Baby"	Metal Box
6.	"Radio 4"	Metal Box
7.	"Pied Piper"	Machines (Virgin label compilation – V 2177)
8.	"Flowers of Romance" (Single Version)	Flowers of Romance Single A-Side
9.	"Four Enclosed Walls"	Flowers of Romance
10.	"Phenagen"	Flowers of Romance
11.	"Track 8"	Flowers of Romance
12.	"Hymie's Him"	Flowers of Romance
13.	"Under The House"	Flowers of Romance
14.	"Banging The Door"	Flowers of Romance
15.	"Go Back"	Flowers of Romance
16.	"Francis Massacre"	Flowers of Romance
17.	"Home Is Where The Heart Is"	Flowers of Romance

Disc three
No.	Title	Track source	Length
1.	"This Is Not a Love Song" (LP Remix)	This Is What You Want... This Is What You Get
2.	"Blue Water"	TIWYW...TIWYG Outtake – Commercial Zone
3.	"Bad Life" (7" edit)	Bad Life Single A-Side
4.	"Question Mark"	Bad Life Single B-Side
5.	"Solitaire"	This Is What You Want... This Is What You Get
6.	"Tie Me To The Length Of That"	This Is What You Want... This Is What You Get
7.	"Where Are You?"	This Is What You Want... This Is What You Get
8.	"The Pardon"	This Is What You Want... This Is What You Get
9.	"1981"	This Is What You Want... This Is What You Get
10.	"The Order Of Death"	This Is What You Want... This Is What You Get
11.	"F.F.F."	Album
12.	"Rise"	Album
13.	"Fishing"	Album
14.	"Round"	Album
15.	"Home"	Album
16.	"Ease"	Album

Disc four
No.	Title	Track source	Length
1.	"Seattle"	Happy?
2.	"Angry"	Happy?
3.	"The Body" (US 12" Mix)	The Body Single A-Side
4.	"Selfish Rubbish"	Seattle Single B-Side
5.	"Disappointed"	9
6.	"Happy"	9
7.	"Warrior" (12" Extended Version)	Warrior Single A-Side
8.	"USLS 1"	9
9.	"Don't Ask Me"	Don't Ask Me Single A-Side
10.	"Criminal"	Point Blank Soundtrack
11.	"Luck's Up"	That What Is Not
12.	"God"	That What Is Not
13.	"Cruel" (BBC Mark Goodier Session)
14.	"Acid Drops" (BBC Mark Goodier Session)
15.	"Love Hope" (BBC Mark Goodier Session)
16.	"Think Tank" (BBC Mark Goodier Session)
