= The Greatest Hits, So Far =

Greatest hits album by Public Image Ltd
- Released: 24 September 1990 (US); 22 October 1990 (UK)
- Recorded: 1978–1990
- Genre: Post-punk, alternative rock
- Length: 65:17
- Label: Virgin
- Producer: Dan Hersch

Public Image Ltd chronology
| 9 (1989) | The Greatest Hits, So Far (1990) | That What Is Not (1992) |

Singles from The Greatest Hits, So Far
- 1. "Don't Ask Me" Released: October 1990

The Greatest Hits, So Far is a greatest hits album by English post-punk band Public Image Ltd, released in 1990 by record label Virgin. It compiles all of the band's singles from 1978 to 1990 and features a new track, "Don't Ask Me", which was released as a single, reaching number 22 the UK and number 2 on the US Modern Rock chart. "This Is Not a Love Song" is not represented in its original single form, but as the remake from This Is What You Want... This Is What You Get. The album's artwork is by notable New Zealand-born artist and musician Reg Mombassa.

== Content ==
"I wanted 28 tracks", John Lydon told Select, "but you have to be reasonable, I suppose. Virgin only wanted eight – 'Ooh, that's all we can get on one album' – and I thought, 'Hold on, I've been on your label twelve years and you only want eight songs? Fuck off!' I refused to deal with them until they came round to my way of thinking. I relished the chance to see what things like 'Warrior' would sound like next to 'Death Disco' and 'Memories', to see if there was any vein running through them. And I was very pleased: there is. They sound like a solid piece of work. They could all have been done at the same time. All musically different, but the attitude is predominant. So I'm pleased with myself."

== Release ==
The Greatest Hits, So Far was released on 24 September 1990 by Virgin in the US and 22 October in the UK.

The title suggests there would be more to come —and there was— but PIL released only one more studio album (1992's That What Is Not) before taking a twenty-year hiatus, after which they released three more studio albums (2012's This Is PiL, 2015's What the World Needs Now..., and 2023's End of World). A more comprehensive PIL compilation, the four-disc Plastic Box, was released in 1999.

== Reception ==
Professional ratings
Review scores
| Source | Rating |
|---|---|
| AllMusic | 4/5 stars |
| Entertainment Weekly | B+ |
| Q | 4/5 stars |
| The Rolling Stone Album Guide | 3.5/5 stars |

"Side one provides a chilling testimony to the boy Lydon's vengeful slaying of his own two-chord punk-monster creation", noted Charlie Dick in Q. "The big commercial hits [...] take up side two while the second disc exorcises the older and wiser Antichrist's assault on stadium rock."

== Track listing ==
1. "Public Image" (from Public Image: First Issue)
2. "Death Disco" (7" edit of the track from Metal Box)
3. "Memories" (from Metal Box)
4. "Careering" (from Metal Box)
5. "Flowers of Romance" (from The Flowers of Romance)
6. "This Is Not a Love Song" (from This Is What You Want... This Is What You Get)
7. "Rise" (Bob Clearmountain remix of the track from Album)
8. "Home" (from Album)
9. "Seattle" (from Happy?)
10. "The Body" (UK 12" extended remix of the track from Happy?)
11. "Rules and Regulations" (from Happy?)
12. "Disappointed" (12" extended version of the track from 9)
13. "Warrior" (Dave Dorrell remix of the track from 9)
14. "Don't Ask Me" (new track, also released as a single)

== Charts ==
| Chart (1990) | Peak position |
|---|---|
| Australian Albums (ARIA) | 102 |
| UK Albums (OCC) | 20 |

== Certifications ==
| Region | Certification | Certified units/sales |
|---|---|---|
| United Kingdom (BPI) | Silver | 60,000^{^} |
^{^} Shipments figures based on certification alone.
