= Ulano =

Ulano is a surname. Notable people with the surname include:

- Mark Ulano (born 1954), American sound engineer
- Sam Ulano (1920–2014), American jazz drummer and teacher
