= Disappointed (Public Image Ltd song) =

Single by Public Image Ltd

from the album 9
- B-side: "Same Old Story"
- Released: April 1989
- Recorded: December 1988 – March 1989
- Genre: Alternative rock
- Length: 5:34
- Label: Virgin
- Songwriter(s): Public Image Ltd, Lu Edmonds, Stephen Hague
- Producer(s): Public Image Ltd, Hague

Public Image Ltd singles chronology
"Seattle" (1987)	"Disappointed" (1989)	"Warrior" (1989)

"Disappointed" is a 1989 song by post-punk group Public Image Ltd. It was the first single from 9, their seventh studio album. Lyrically, the song was inspired by John Lydon's experiences with friends within the band throughout its history, who he commented often let him down. Musically, guitarist John McGeoch used an alternate tuning courtesy of Who guitarist Pete Townshend to begin composing the song.

"Disappointed" was a commercial hit for the band, becoming its most successful UK single in three years and becoming an alternative rock radio hit in the US. It has since seen positive critical reception and Lydon has named the song as one of his personal favorites.

== Background ==
"Disappointed" was written by the then-current members of Public Image Ltd (John Lydon, John McGeoch, Allan Dias, Bruce Smith), former member Lu Edmonds, and producer Stephen Hague. Lyrically the song was inspired by Lydon's experience with band turmoil caused by his friends: "'Disappointed' is what it says, it's just about the many and varied ways people let you down." He specifically cited former bandmates Keith Levene and Jah Wobble, of whom he said, "All they've done is turn around and criticize and moan like selfish, whiny spoiled brats and that's an awful thing to see friends behave that way." He later reflected,

"Everybody thinks they're better than everybody else, because they're being fed things not only by their girlfriend's friends but by record company executives. It’s so disruptive. I don’t know a way out of it but you have to go through those periods in life. You find out you can't trust everybody you thought you could, and that's hurtful, but it's also good song material. [sings] 'Disappointed a few people.' It's what it is."

In another interview, Lydon explained, "Friends will let you down, but that doesn't mean you shouldn't have friends. You should enjoy it for the very fact that they are human beings and fallible, that that very fallibility is what you should enjoy about human contact. Otherwise, really what you're asking for is sycophantic robots that merely compliment your ego. And there's no enjoyment in that." Lydon has since called "Disappointed" one of his favorite songs that he has written, commenting, "If I could ever call a song a friend, 'Disappointed' is one of them."

Musically, John McGeoch credited for inspiration an alternate tuning that Who guitarist Pete Townshend had chosen. He recalled, "I was doing some work at Eel Pie Studios five or six years ago and Townshend had left some guitar cases lying around the place. I opened one up and there was an acoustic guitar with a receipt dated 1969 [...] The tuning on the guitar was D-A-D-A-D-E, bottom to top. That's what I used on 'Disappointed'."

== Release ==
"Disappointed" was released as the first single from the band's seventh album 9 in April 1989. In the UK, the single was the band's biggest hit since 1986's "Rise," reaching number 38 on the charts. In the US, the song became the band's most successful track to date, having received frequent play on modern rock radio stations and its video having been played on MTV. The song topped Billboard's Modern Rock Tracks chart, while also reaching number 26 on the Dance Club Songs chart. It also reached number 94 on the Australian charts.

The song has also appeared on compilation albums such as The Greatest Hits, So Far and Plastic Box.

== Critical reception ==
Since its release, "Disappointed" has seen a positive critical reception. Andy Kellman of AllMusic considered the song a highlight of 9 and called it "catchy." Trouser Press was similarly positive in spite of its mixed view of 9, concluding, "There's no questioning [Lydon's] sincerity in the venomous 'Disappointed.'"
