= Sam Ulano =

American jazz musician

Solomon Paul "Sam" Ulano (August 12, 1920 – January 1, 2014) was an American jazz drummer and teacher. He is often called by the nickname "Mr. Rhythm."

== Career ==
Ulano began playing drums at age 13 and opened his first drum studio four years later. He wrote many instruction books for the drums and appeared on several television programs, including Tonight Starring Steve Allen. He recorded with Moondog, and was also for one night in 1981 a member of the English post-punk band Public Image Ltd. He was a life long native of New York City.

His son, Mark Ulano, is a Hollywood sound engineer and won an Academy Award in 1998 for Titanic. His daughter, Susan Ulano-Galgay, is a SAG background actor for feature films and major television production.

== Books ==
- Ulano, Sam. I Love What I Do!: A Drummer's Philosophy of Life at Eighty. ISBN 1-890995-35-5.
