= Death Disco =

Single by Public Image Ltd

from the album Metal Box
- A-side: 7" – "Death Disco"; 12" – "½ Mix"
- B-side: 7" – "No Birds Do Sing"; 12" – "Megga Mix"
- Released: 29 June 1979 (UK)
- Genre: Post-punk; avant-funk; dub; dance-punk
- Length: 4:11
- Label: Virgin VS 274
- Songwriter(s): Keith Levene, John Lydon, John Wardle, Jim Walker, David Humphrey
- Producer(s): Public Image Ltd

Public Image Ltd singles chronology
"Public Image" (1978)	"Death Disco" (1979)	"Memories" (1979)

Alternative cover
- 12" cover

"Death Disco" is a song by Public Image Ltd. The record was released in both 7" and 12" single formats with a "½ Mix" of the song and "Megga mix" (an instrumental version of "Fodderstompf" from Public Image: First Issue) on the 12" version. It reached number twenty on the UK Singles Chart. The song was released in an alternative shorter version as "Swan Lake" on the group's second album, Metal Box, with slight changes at the end. The title change reflects the quote from Tchaikovsky's ballet score that surfaces in Keith Levene's guitar part.

In his autobiography, Rotten: No Irish, No Blacks, No Dogs, Lydon stated that the song was written for his mother, who had died of cancer not long before. "I watched her die," he told Select in 1990. "She was tough, my mum. She asked me to write a disco song for her funeral. This was hardly happy stuff."

According to AllMusic, "the song is built on a dense groove informed equally by dub and disco" and features both "Lydon at his most desperate and stark" and Keith Levene "dishing out shards of guitar that complement the rhythm one moment and then shift into horrific riffing the next."

"Death Disco" was also included on the 1983 album Live in Tokyo.

The song was ranked at No. 11 among the top "Tracks of the Year" of 1979 by NME.

Paul Lester of The Guardian wrote that "Death Disco" was "the biggest hit with a load of rhythmical dissonance [...] until the dosser disco of Happy Mondays' "Hallelujah" ten years later."

== Track listing ==
7" vinyl

1. "Death Disco" – 4:11
2. "No Birds Do Sing" – 4:41

12" vinyl

1. "½ Mix" - 6:42
2. "Megga Mix" - 6:51

== Personnel ==
- John Lydon - vocals, piano on "No Birds Do Sing"
- Keith Levene - guitar, synthesizer
- Jah Wobble - bass
- David Humphrey - drums on "Death Disco", "½ Mix"
- Richard Dudanski - drums on "No Birds Do Sing"
- Jim Walker - drums on "Megga Mix"
