= That What Is Not =

Studio album by Public Image Ltd
- Released: 10 February 1992
- Recorded: 1991
- Studio: Eldorado Studios, Los Angeles, United States
- Genre: Alternative rock
- Length: 49:37
- Label: Virgin
- Producer: Dave Jerden

Public Image Ltd chronology
The Greatest Hits, So Far (1990)	That What Is Not (1992)	This is PiL (2012)

Professional ratings
Review scores
Source	Rating
AllMusic	2/5 stars
The Encyclopedia of Popular Music	2/5 stars
Entertainment Weekly	A
MusicHound Rock: The Essential Album Guide	2/5 stars
The Rolling Stone Album Guide	2.5/5 stars
Spin Alternative Record Guide	2/10

That What Is Not is the eighth studio album by Public Image Ltd, released on 10 February 1992 in the US, and on 24 February 1992 in the UK. It was the band's final album before a 20-year hiatus, and the final recordings with longtime members Allan Dias (bass) and John McGeoch (lead guitar).

== Critical reception ==
The Los Angeles Times wrote that Lydon "has been able to stay somewhat current by rocking persuasively and directing his still considerable bile toward such germane targets as censors and militarists." Entertainment Weekly wrote that the album "showcases PIL’s brutal version of modern dance rock, an angry sound that pummels rather than lulls." Trouser Press wrote that the songs "display either a loss of conviction, an absence of inspiration or a grave lack of effort."

== Track listing ==
All tracks written by PiL

No.	Title	Length
1.	"Acid Drops"	6:35
2.	"Luck's Up"	4:07
3.	"Cruel"	5:18
4.	"God"	5:33
5.	"Covered"	4:40
6.	"Love Hope"	3:48
7.	"Unfairground"	5:16
8.	"Think Tank"	4:40
9.	"Emperor"	4:08
10.	"Good Things"	5:34

== Personnel ==
Public Image Limited

- John Lydon – lead vocals (uncredited on actual album packaging)
- John McGeoch – lead guitar
- Gregg "J.P." Arreguin – rhythm guitar
- Allan Dias – bass, backing vocals, keyboards
- Curt "Kirkee B." Bisquera – drums, percussion

with:

- Tower of Power – horns on "Covered" and "Good Things"
- Jimmie Wood – harmonica on "Covered", "Love Hope" and "Good Things"
- Bonnie Sheridan – background vocals on "Good Things"

== Track by track commentary by band members ==
"Acid Drops":

- John Lydon (1992): "[The song is about] censorship – that particularly relates to America, because there's a lot of vested interest groups, like all these religious fanatics. They're saying the human body, and everything connected with it, is dirty – that's wrong. I don't believe in censorship of any kind". "Well, [using a Sex Pistols sample for the song] started off as a joke. The producer threw it in one night for a laugh. I didn't find it too funny at first! But now I think it's perfect for the song. Oh, why not? I can't take myself too seriously". "I'd recommend him to anyone – he's the best producer I've ever worked with. He's a rarity, in that he speaks his mind. He doesn't do things for fashionable reasons".

"Luck's Up":

- John Lydon (1999): “'Luck's Up' is about the hopelessness of junkies and druggies".

"Think Tank":

- John Lydon (1992/99): “'Think Tank' is me having a go back at all the people who all the time rewrite and misrepresent the events of my past, usually middle-class journalists who were never there at the time". "Yes, ['Think Tank' is about rewriting] my history, in particular. I know Jon very well – I just don't like the slant of his book with that upper-class attitude of those who know everything, while us working-class bums know nothing".

=== Related tracks ===
"Criminal":

- John Lydon (1990/99): "A whole bunch of new stuff which will be recorded in January, February, March [1991] – that way, and I think in England. I couldn't tell you who the producer is at the moment, because me and my record company are squabbling! Yes, folks, I do love to drag my dirty laundry out in public!” “'Criminal' was for the soundtrack for the movie Point Break.”
- Allan Dias (2004): "It was written specifically for the movie. I think initially it was one of John McGeoch's songs, or a sketch that he had, it was based on that. We went into the studio with a producer specifically to do that track, it was a one-off thing, it wasn't an outtake or anything. As I recall we were approached by someone from the movie, but I think we were in the middle of recording an album or something, possibly working on '9', and by the time we got the track done and put it to them it was too late to be considered for the title track. But they put it on there regardless".

== Charts ==
Chart (1992)	Peak position
UK Albums (OCC)	46
