= Paris au Printemps =

Live album by Public Image Ltd
- Released: 14 November 1980 (UK); January 1981 (Japan)
- Recorded: 17–18 January 1980
- Venue: Le Palace, Paris
- Genre: Post-punk
- Length: 41:03
- Label: Virgin
- Producer: Public Image Ltd

Public Image Ltd chronology
Metal Box (1979)	Paris au Printemps (1980)	The Flowers of Romance (1981)

Professional ratings
Review scores
Source	Rating
Allmusic	3/5 stars
Robert Christgau	B+
NME	(?)
Rolling Stone	4/5 stars

Paris au Printemps is a live album recorded by Public Image Ltd (given as 'Image Publique S.A.' on the cover) in 1980 on two consecutive dates in January in Paris, and released in November the same year. The title of the album is French for 'Paris in the Spring', with French names also given to the band itself and songs in the track listing. It is notable as the band's last full-length release featuring founding bass player Jah Wobble, as well as the Paris concerts being drummer Martin Atkins' first gigs with Public Image Ltd. The album reached number 61 on the UK album charts.

== Recording ==
John Lydon has stressed that the album was made and submitted to Virgin Records to cover the band's expenses for the Metal Box album. During a BBC radio interview in 1992 he said:

We had to do that to finance the making of Metal Box. Because money was very, very tight. I did explain that in every interview I ever did. Don't buy this live record, because it's not very good.

It has additionally been described as countering an abundance of "unlistenable" bootlegs of the band's live performances being released at the time. Lydon has elaborated that the album cost the band "exactly the price of one reel-to-reel tape to record", which they did on a Revox recorder, consequently receiving £30,000 from Virgin Records for it. The same amount has been mentioned as the sum the band had previously invested into the release of the Metal Box album.

== Packaging ==
The front cover painting is by John Lydon and represents himself, Keith Levene and Jeannette Lee.

== Track listing ==
=== Side one ===
1. "Thème" ("Theme") – 8:37
2. "Psalmodie" ("Chant") – 4:26
3. "Précipitamment" ("Careering") – 7:12

=== Side two ===
1. "Sale Bébé" ("Bad Baby") – 6:23
2. "La Vie Ignoble" ("Low Life") – 4:20
3. "Attaque" ("Attack") – 3:01
4. "Timbres De Pop" ("Poptones") – 7:04

== Personnel ==
Public Image Limited

- John Lydon – vocals, sleeve paintings
- Keith Levene – guitar, synthesiser
- Jah Wobble – bass
- Martin Atkins – drums

== Charts ==
Chart (1980–81)	Peak position
New Zealand Albums (RMNZ)	48
UK Albums (OCC)	61
