= 9 (Public Image Ltd album) =

Studio album by Public Image Ltd
- Released: 8 May 1989
- Recorded: December 1988 – March 1989
- Studios: The Manor Studio, Shipton-on-Cherwell; Comfort's Place Studios, Lingfield
- Genres: New wave; pop rock
- Length: 44:04
- Label: Virgin
- Producers: Stephen Hague; Eric "ET" Thorngren; Public Image Ltd

Public Image Ltd chronology
Happy? (1987)	9 (1989)	The Greatest Hits, So Far (1990)

Singles from 9
- 1. "Disappointed" Released: April 1989; 2. "Warrior" Released: July 1989

Professional ratings
Review scores
Source	Rating
AllMusic	3/5 stars
Christgau’s Consumer Guide	C+
The Rolling Stone Album Guide	2.5/5 stars

9 is the seventh studio album by Public Image Ltd, but their ninth full-length release including the live albums Paris au Printemps and Live in Tokyo. It was released in the US on 8 May 1989 on the Virgin Records label, and on 30 May 1989 in the UK.

== Background ==
The band that recorded 9 consisted of John Lydon, bassist Allan Dias, guitarist John McGeoch and drummer Bruce Smith. Former guitarist Lu Edmonds left the band by the time the album was recorded due to problems with tinnitus. However, Edmonds received a writing co-credit on all tracks, although he does not play on the album. Ted Chau, who replaced Edmonds in the band, does not perform on 9.

The album was produced by Stephen Hague, Eric "ET" Thorngren, and the band. Bill Laswell, who had produced Album three years earlier, had originally been lined up to produce 9. However, tension between Laswell and Lydon after the recording of that album, coupled with Laswell's desire to once again use his own cast of session musicians on 9 and his dissatisfaction with Public Image's new line-up, led to the agreement being cancelled.

The first album track to be released was "Warrior", which showed up on the soundtrack album to the movie Slaves of New York, released on 20 March 1989. The track "Sand Castles in the Snow" was originally titled "Spit", and was so listed in various Virgin pre-release information.

== Track listing ==
All tracks composed by Dias, Edmonds, Lydon, McGeoch and Smith except "Disappointed" (Dias, Edmonds, Lydon, McGeoch, Smith and Hague)

No.	Title	Producer	Length
1.	"Happy"	Stephen Hague	3:57
2.	"Disappointed"	Stephen Hague	5:34
3.	"Warrior"	Stephen Hague	4:17
4.	"U.S.L.S. 1"	Eric "ET" Thorngren	5:37
5.	"Sand Castles in the Snow"	Stephen Hague	3:44
6.	"Worry"	Stephen Hague	3:54
7.	"Brave New World"	Eric "ET" Thorngren	4:19
8.	"Like That"	Eric "ET" Thorngren	3:40
9.	"Same Old Story"	Eric "ET" Thorngren	4:19
10.	"Armada"	Eric "ET" Thorngren	4:43

== Personnel ==
Public Image Ltd.

- John Lydon - vocals
- John McGeoch - guitar
- Allan Dias - bass
- Bruce Smith - drums, percussion, programming

== Charts ==
Chart (1989)	Peak position
Australian Albums (Kent Music Report)	57
UK Albums (Official Charts)	36
US Billboard 200	106
