= Metal Box =

- Original metal canister packaging released in 1979.

Studio album by Public Image Ltd
- Released: 23 November 1979
- Recorded: March – October 1979
- Studios: The Manor (Shipton-on-Cherwell, England); Gooseberry Sound; Townhouse (London); Advision (London); Rollerball (London)
- Genres: Post-punk; experimental rock; dub; avant-garde; dance
- Length: 60:29
- Label: Virgin
- Producer: Public Image Ltd

Public Image Ltd chronology
Public Image: First Issue (1978)	Metal Box (1979)	Paris au Printemps (1980)

Second Edition cover

Singles from Metal Box
- 1. "Death Disco (Swan Lake)" Released: 29 June 1979; 2. "Memories" Released: October 1979

Metal Box is the second studio album by Public Image Ltd, released by Virgin Records on 23 November 1979. The album takes its name from the round metal canister which contained the initial pressings of the record. It was later reissued in standard LP packaging as Second Edition in February 1980 by Virgin Records in the United Kingdom, and by Warner Bros. Records and Island Records in the United States.

The album was a departure from PiL's 1978 debut First Issue, with the band moving into a more avant-garde sound characterised by John Lydon's cryptic lyrics, propulsive dub-inspired rhythms led by bassist Jah Wobble, and an abrasive, "metallic" guitar sound developed by guitarist Keith Levene.

Metal Box is widely regarded as a landmark release in the history of post-punk. In 2012, the album was ranked number 461 on Rolling Stone magazine's list of The 500 Greatest Albums of All Time.

== Background ==
The first studio album recorded following the departure of founding member, drummer Jim Walker, Metal Box was recorded in several discreet sessions with several drummers, none of whom were credited on the original release. "Albatross" and "Swan Lake"/"Death Disco" were recorded with new drummer David Humphrey at The Manor Studio in Shipton-on-Cherwell. "Poptones" was recorded with Levene on drums. During this time, additional tracks were recorded at The Town House Studios in London, namely "Beat the Drum for Me" (which later turned up on Wobble's first solo album), and a new version of "Fodderstompf" (which became the B-side of PiL's "Death Disco" 12-inch single). Humphrey left the band around mid-May 1979. "Memories", "No Birds", "Socialist" and "Chant" were recorded with new drummer, Richard Dudanski, previously of Joe Strummer's R&B pub rock outfit, The 101ers, at Townhouse Studios in London. The instrumental "Graveyard" was recorded with Dudanski on drums. Dudanski left the band around mid-September 1979. "The Suit" was recorded as a solo track by Jah Wobble at Gooseberry Sound Studios in London. Vocals and some overdubs were added at The Manor. "Careering" was recorded at Town House Studios with Wobble on drums. "Bad Baby" was recorded with new drummer Martin Atkins at Town House Studios. Except for a brief period during 1980, Atkins remained with the band until 1985. "Radio 4" was recorded as a solo piece by Keith Levene at Advision Studios and an unknown second studio. According to Levene, this was the last recorded track. Levene utilised aluminium Veleno guitars throughout the recording sessions to achieve a distinctively sharp and metallic guitar sound.

== Recording and music ==
According to John Lydon, "Many people don't understand that it was improvisation [...] It had to be, because we'd spent most of the money on the container – and so what we had to do was quite literally sneak into studios when bands had gone home for the night. And these were pretty rough monitor mixes – no actual production." "Albatross'" was recorded live at The Manor Studio in Oxfordshire, with Lydon free-forming his lyrics. Guitarist Keith Levene, bassist Jah Wobble, and drummer David Humphrey made the song up as they went along, and recorded the song in one take. PiL also recorded at Townhouse Studios in West London with session drummer Richard Dudanski and produced the songs "Memories", "No Birds", "Socialist", and "Chant"; Levene recalls that "Memories" features him playing "this normal Spanish guitar thing that goes dun-da-da-dun da-da-dun... it's one of the first things I learned to play on guitar, very simple. I was very fond of that [...] I just had the guitar going through an Electric Mistress."

"Death Disco", which had been released as a single in late June 1979, was remixed and retitled "Swan Lake" for Metal Box. "I realised," said Levene, "that this tune that I was bastardising by mistake was 'Swan Lake', so I started playing it on purpose but I was doing it from memory. You can hear that I'm not playing it exactly right. It just worked. [...] There's a few versions of that. The one on Metal Box is version two, which is very different from the simpler, original 12-inch version." Lydon wrote the lyrics in abstract response to his mother succumbing to cancer: "When I had to deal with my mother's death, which upset the fuck out of me, I did it partly through music. I had to watch her die slowly of cancer for a whole year. I wrote 'Death Disco' about that. I played it to her just before she died and she was very happy. That's the Irish in her, nothing drearily sympathetic or weak." PiL recorded the song at an empty hall in Brixton to test a three-bass sound system and worked with drummer Jim Walker but did not record with him.

"Poptones" was one of the first songs recorded for the album, according to Levene, who stated that he inadvertently played Yes' "Starship Trooper" during the song. According to Lydon, "Poptones" was based on a story "straight out of the Daily Mirror" about a girl who was kidnapped and "bundled, blindfolded, into the back of a car by a couple of bad men and driven off into a forest, where they eventually dumped her. The men had a cassette machine with an unusual tune on the cassette, which they kept playing over and over. The girl remembered the song, and that, along with her recollection of the car and the men's voices, is how the police identified them. The police eventually stopped the car and found the cassette was still in the machine, with the same distinctive song on the tape." In his 2009 autobiography Memoirs of a Geezer, Jah Wobble says that Poptones refers to "a journey we took in Joe the roadie's Japanese car [..] and Joe had one of his dodgy cassettes playing.". He highlighted the song as "the jewel in the PiL crown. [...] That [bass] line is as symmetrical as a snowflake. [..] We had a drummer with us who was pretty good [...] but the bloke just couldn't get the right feel for 'Poptones'. [...] In the end Levene put the drums down on that track, his drums are a bit loose, but that is actually a good thing."

Wobble cited "Careering" as his "second-favourite track from Metal Box, and probably my favourite John Lydon vocal performance." Lyrically, the song is "basically about a gunman [in Northern Ireland] who is careering as a professional businessman in London." The song was recorded at the Townhouse during a quick nighttime session led by Wobble; he told journalist Simon Reynolds in an interview: "If you listen to the drum rhythm it is very similar to the sort of rhythm a drum and fife band would create. [...] By now Keith had got hold of a Prophet synth, he used that on 'Careering'." Wobble created the drum track and bassline, while Levene played synthesiser. Levene claimed that his performance in the song was an attempt to replicate the sound of ambient machine noises heard from a downstairs toilet, which he achieved by leaving an item on the keyboard while he modulated the synthesiser.

"No Birds Do Sing" (also listed as "No Birds") features a line from the English Romantic poet John Keats' "La Belle Dame sans Merci", which Lydon "just borrowed a bit of because it suited this particular rant about suburbia." The song was recorded at the Townhouse with drummer Richard Dudanski, who Keith Levene knew during his tenure with The 101ers. Wobble said that Dudanski made extensive and imaginative use of the tom-tom drums, and Levene told Simon Reynolds that "No Birds" is one of his favourite songs on the album. "All that it is is me playing the guitar part and duplicating it, but feeding the second one through this effect I'd set up on the harmoniser. Meanwhile John is lying under the piano and singing that weird feedback voice, while twinkling the keys at the same time, just to be annoying. You can hear the piano on the record," said Levene.

"Graveyard" features a guitar part that was "made up on the spot," according to Levene. "I was in a very Clint Eastwood mood. I didn't know what I was going to play. Wobble's playing the bassline and drums are playing so I had to do something." The album version is an instrumental; a version with lyrics and vocals was retitled "Another" and released as the B-side to "Memories" in October 1979.

"The Suit"—described by Lydon as being about "people of low origins trying to be posh"—is one of Levene's least favourite tracks. Levene said, "It was never one of my favourite pieces because of what it was really about. [...] There was this guy that was an old mate of John's who lived in this apartment. At some point John decided he hated his guts. He just wrote this really nasty, finger-pointing, over-exaggerated, ripping parody of what the guy was – 'Society boy.' [...] This guy, [fashion designer] Kenny MacDonald, made his suit and all of ours and it made him look good to have the guys from PiL wearing his stuff. We'd wear it wrong and it looked even better, we didn't want the black leather jacket look like these punk bands. So John just decided to hate this guy, that's what happens and there's nothing you can do. He wouldn't be his lapdog and John thought he was a star and wanted that." Wobble played and recorded the backing track of drums and piano for "The Suit" at Gooseberry Studios with Mark Lusardi, which started out as a cover of "Blueberry Hill". He brought the backing track to the band at The Manor, to which Lydon "freaked out when he heard that... He was galvanised into action and within a few hours 'The Suit' existed."

"Bad Baby"—its title a nickname of Levene's—was recorded at the Townhouse. Wobble (whose playing in the song was inspired by bassist Cecil McBee) and drummer Martin Atkins recorded the song together.

Levene recalled that "Socialist" featured cheap synthesizers he had purchased: "Me and Wobble were really having fun fucking around with these things, whilst submerged in the mix was this huge soaring sound, rising upwards from the drum and the bass, like a whale's cry. Later on I dubbed up the cymbals, so you have that spiralling metallic sound. Dubwise!" Wobble told Simon Reynolds, "At the time I was a bit of a socialist. [...] I hated Thatcher, I hated everything Reagan stood for to be quite honest, you know, and at that time I just wanted that old-style, left-wing socialism."

Lydon called "Chant" an "old English ditty with a string synthesizer". Drummer Richard Dudanski cited it as one of his favourites.

Album closer "Radio 4" was named after the BBC radio station. "I called it 'Radio 4' because in England, you got Radio 1, 2, 3...," said Levene. "Radio 1 played pop tunes. Before that, the BBC was so boring! It took until about 1985 before we had FM radio." "Radio 4" was recorded and performed by Levene, initially with Ken Lockie from Cowboys International on drums, at Advision Studios. Levene played the bassline "as if it was Wobble playing," and played a Yamaha String Ensemble to create the layered synth sounds. "I was using this thing and I start building it up, all I'm doing is taking different sounds from this thing and layering it. When I heard it, I pulled the drums out. I got on the idea of trying to make it sound orchestrated with the long chords played shorter. To get round the other stuff, I just used what was at hand. I played bass like I imagined Wobble would play bass to it, I wanted a Wobble feel to it. But basically, it's all me – that's when I realised I can completely do everything. You just hear the drums at the end. [...] With 'Radio 4', I was just alone in the studio one night, and I was overwhelmed with the sense of space. I just took everything out of the studio, moved the drum kit out and played everything myself, reproducing this sense of cold spaciousness I felt around me."

== Metal box packaging ==
The title of the album refers to its original packaging, which consisted of a metal case in the style of a 16mm film canister embossed with the band's logo and containing three 12" 45rpm records. It was designed by Dennis Morris and was innovative and inexpensive, costing little more to the label than the cost of standard printed sleeves for equivalent 12" releases (although Virgin did ask for a refund of a third of the band's advance due to the cost). Before the metal tin was finalised, there was discussion of the album being released in a sandpaper package that would effectively ruin the sleeve art of any records shelved next to it. That idea would later be realised by the Durutti Column for their 1980 Factory Records debut, The Return of the Durutti Column.

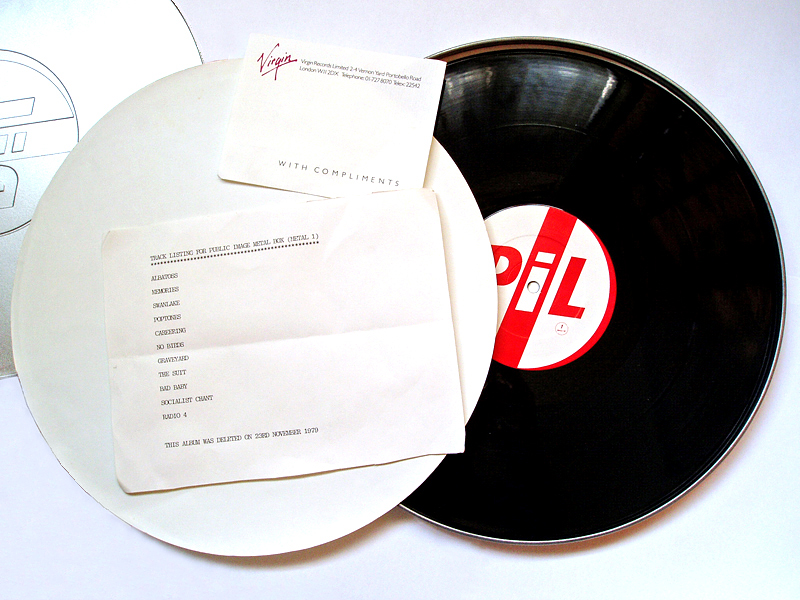
Metal Box opened

The album's lack of accessibility extended to the discs themselves. Packed tightly inside the canister and separated by paper sheets, they were difficult to remove, and were prone to being nicked and scratched in the process. Since each side only contained about ten minutes of music, the listener was required to frequently change sides to hear the complete album.

Deleted from the catalogue on 23 November 1979 after an initial release of 60,000 units, the album was re-issued on 22 February 1980 as Second Edition, a double LP packaged in a more conventional gatefold. The sleeve art of Second Edition consists of distorted photographs of the band members, achieving a funhouse mirror effect. (The front cover is a composite photo of Keith Levene and John Lydon.) The lyrics are printed on the rear cover. These were originally printed in a magazine advertisement and not included with Metal Box. The band initially wanted the album released with a lyric sheet but no track titles. The United Kingdom version of Second Edition appears as the band intended, with lyrics on the back cover, but no titles, and "PiL" logo labels on all four sides of the vinyl. The US edition of Second Edition has track titles both on the back cover and the labels.

The original metal canister idea was used a few years later during the compact disc era. By the late 1980s, some CDs were packaged in metal canisters. In 1990 the concept came full circle, with the compact disc release of Metal Box employing a smaller version of the original metal canister, containing a single disc and a small paper insert.

Tape with the PiL logo was created with the intent of sealing each metal box, but labour costs were deemed too expensive and the tape went unused. Martin Atkins has some of this tape and has put some pieces of it up on auctions to benefit The Museum Of Post Punk and Industrial Music.

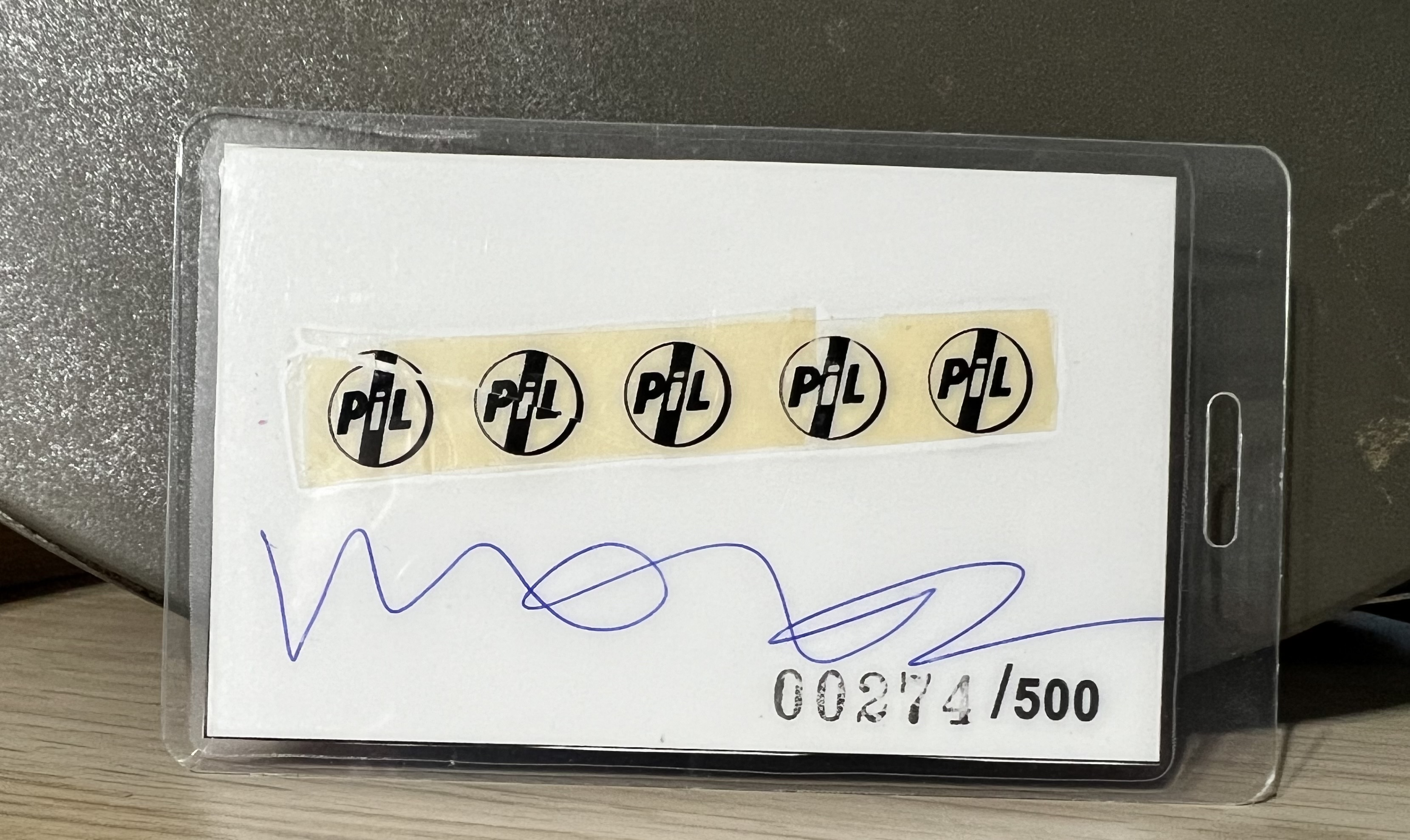
PiL tape intended to seal Metal Box

== Critical reception ==
Professional ratings
Review scores
Source	Rating
AllMusic	5/5 stars
Mojo	5/5 stars
NME	9/10
Pitchfork	10/10
Q	5/5 stars
Rolling Stone	4.5/5 stars
The Rolling Stone Album Guide	4/5 stars
Spin Alternative Record Guide	10/10
Uncut	5/5 stars
The Village Voice	A−

=== Contemporaneous ===
At the of Metal Box’s release, Village Voice critic Robert Christgau described the album's sound as "a full-bodied superaware white dub with disorienting European echoes."

The album was ranked at No. 2 among the top "Albums of the Year" for 1979 by NME, with "Death Disco" ranked at No. 11 among the year's top tracks. Robert Palmer placed the album at third place in his best of 1980 list for the New York Times, proclaiming the album to be the "definitive album of postpunk rock and the year's most compelling slice of metal machine music."

=== Retrospective ===
Metal Box is now considered a post-punk classic, and is highly acclaimed. Andy Kellman of AllMusic said that "PIL managed to avoid boundaries for the first four years of their existence, and Metal Box is undoubtedly the apex", noting that the album "hardly [sounds] like anything of the past, present, or future". He also compared it to the works of Captain Beefheart and Can. Drowned in Sound reviewer Mark Ward wrote that the album "tears away from Lydon's sweaty punk roots and into the cold chambers of dub evoked by Can, the more outré electronics of Bowie's Berlin years and the coruscating post-punk sound that guitarist Levene was in the process of pioneering" and that "if you don't yet have a copy, you really should".

In 2003, the album was included in Rolling Stone's 500 Greatest Albums of All Time list at No. 469, the magazine calling it "eerie, futuristic art punk with dub bass and slashing guitar". Rolling Stone also included it in their 100 Best Albums of the Eighties, ranking it at No. 76. In 2002, Pitchfork ranked Metal Box at No. 19 on its "Top 100 Albums of the 1980s". It was also, along with their debut album, included in the book 1001 Albums You Must Hear Before You Die, with the reviewer Stevie Chick saying "the abrasive textures and powerful sounds they discovered...would influence all manner of experimental music for decades to come", while describing it as "cold dank, unforgiving, subterranean." The songs "Albatross", "Poptones", "Careering", "Chant" and "Radio 4" were selected as "key tracks". In 2020, Rolling Stone included it in their "80 Greatest albums of 1980" list, praising the band for pushing "beyond post-punk into a fractured space between demented abstraction and cranky freedom".

== Track listings ==
All words, music and production credited to Public Image Ltd.

=== Original release ===
The original release of Metal Box comprised six sides of 12-inch vinyl, played at 45 rpm. While this track order would be reconfigured for the Second Edition version of the album on LP and CD, compact discs reissued in the Metal Box format maintain this track listing packaged as either one or three CDs in a 5” metal canister.

Side A
No.	Title	Length
1.	"Albatross"	10:34

Side B
No.	Title	Length
1.	"Memories"	5:05
2.	"Swan Lake"	4:11

Side C
No.	Title	Length
1.	"Poptones"	7:46
2.	"Careering"	4:32

Side D
No.	Title	Length
1.	"No Birds"	4:41
2.	"Graveyard"	3:07

Side E
No.	Title	Length
1.	"The Suit"	3:29
2.	"Bad Baby"	4:30

Side F
No.	Title	Length
1.	"Socialist/Chant/Radio 4"	12:34

=== Second Edition ===
Second Edition fits the album onto four 33 rpm sides and features a slightly different song order ("Socialist/Chant/Radio 4" is split into its component parts, with "Socialist" and "No Birds" swapping places), and subsequent digital versions of Second Edition follow this track order.

Side One
No.	Title	Length
1.	"Albatross"	10:34
2.	"Memories"	5:05

Side Two
No.	Title	Length
1.	"Swan Lake"	4:11
2.	"Poptones"	7:46
3.	"Careering"	4:32

Side Three
No.	Title	Length
1.	"Socialist"	3:09
2.	"Graveyard"	3:07
3.	"The Suit"	3:29

Side Four
No.	Title	Length
1.	"Bad Baby"	4:30
2.	"No Birds"	4:41
3.	"Chant"	5:01
4.	"Radio 4"	4:24

== Personnel ==
Public Image Limited

- John Lydon – vocals, piano ("No Birds" and "Bad Baby")
- Keith Levene – guitar, synthesizers, drums ("Poptones" and "Radio 4"), bass guitar ("Radio 4")
- Jah Wobble – bass guitar (except "Radio 4"), drums ("Careering" and "The Suit"), piano ("The Suit")
- David Humphrey – drums ("Albatross" and "Swan Lake")
- Richard Dudanski – drums ("Memories", "No Birds", "Graveyard", "Socialist" and "Chant")
- Martin Atkins – drums ("Bad Baby")

Note: Levene played all instruments on "Radio 4".

Technical

- Nick Cook, Hugh Padgham, George Chambers – engineers
- PiL, Dennis Morris – sleeve design and concept
- Metal Box Company – packaging

== Charts ==
=== Metal Box ===
Chart (1979–80)	Peak position
New Zealand Albums (RMNZ)	21
UK Albums (Official Charts)	18
US Billboard 200	171

=== Second Edition ===
Chart (1980)	Peak position
New Zealand Albums (RMNZ)	28
UK Albums (Official Charts)	46

== Rerecorded version ==
Bassist Jah Wobble recorded and released a new version of the album in 2021, titled Metal Box - Rebuilt in Dub.
