= Richard Dudanski =

British drummer

Richard "Snakehips" Dudanski, also known as Richard Nother, is an English drummer who was a member of a number of seminal British proto-punk, punk and post-punk bands, including The 101ers, The Raincoats, Public Image Ltd., Tymon Dogg and the Fools, and the Martin Hannett produced roots-rock dub outfit, Basement 5. He was invited by fellow 101er Joe Strummer to become a member of an early incarnation of The Clash. Dudanski published his memoirs, Squat City Rocks: protopunk and beyond. a musical memoir from the margins, in 2014.
