= Public Image Ltd =

English rock band

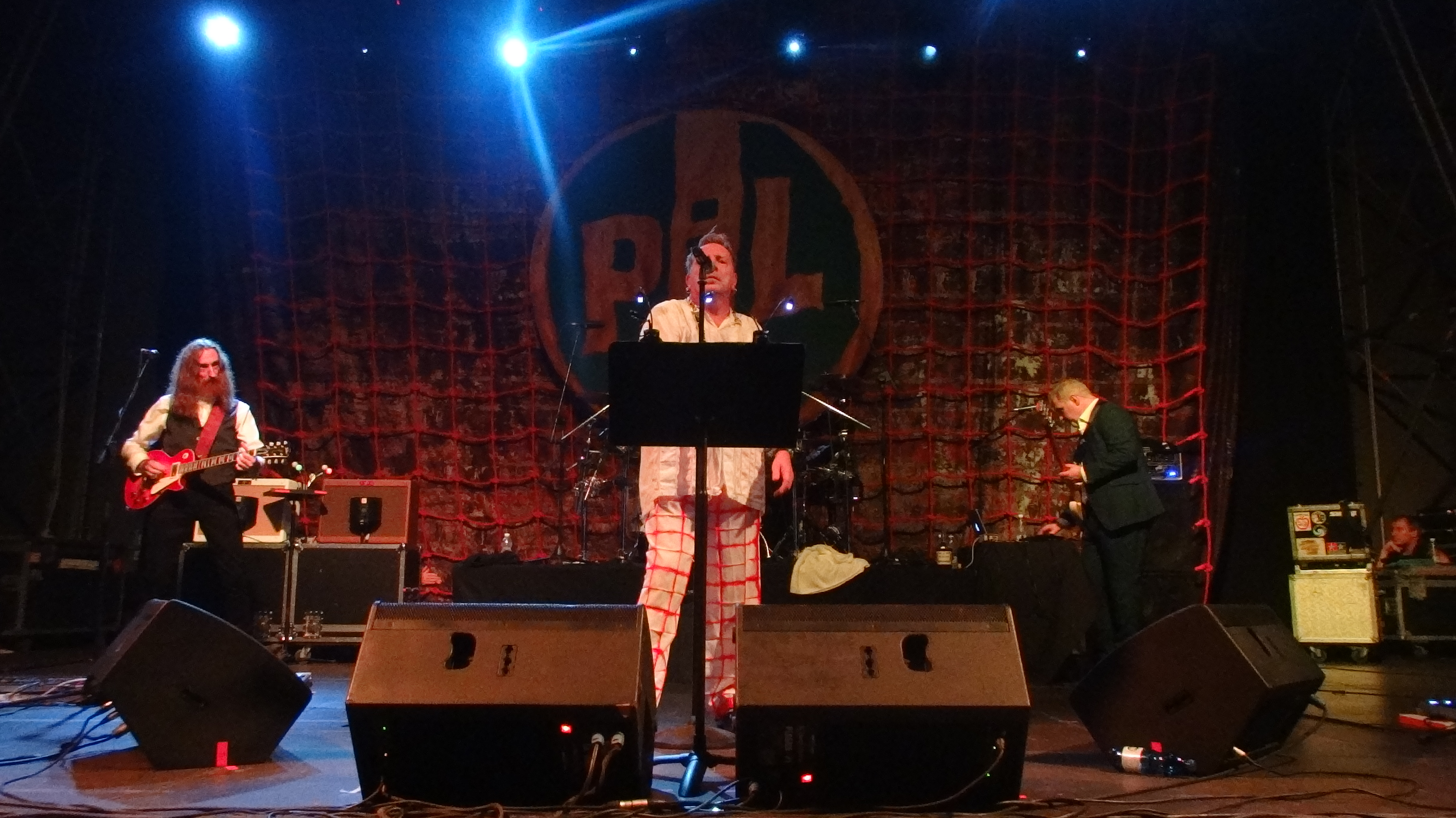
- PiL performing in 2013

Background information
- Also known as: PiL; Public Image Limited; Public Image
- Origin: London, England
- Genres: Post-punk; experimental rock; new wave; dub; avant-funk
- Years active: 1978–1992; 2009–present
- Labels: Virgin; Warner Bros.; Elektra; PiL Official
- Members: John Lydon; Lu Edmonds; Scott Firth; Mark Roberts
- Past members: Keith Levene; Jah Wobble; Jeannette Lee; Jim Walker; Vivian Jackson; David Humphrey; Richard Dudanski; Karl Burns; Martin Atkins; Ken Lockie; Pete Jones; John McGeoch; Bruce Smith; Allan Dias; Russell Webb
- Website: pilofficial.com

Public Image Ltd (abbreviated and stylised as PiL) are an English post-punk band formed by lead vocalist John Lydon (previously, as Johnny Rotten, lead vocalist of the Sex Pistols), guitarist Keith Levene (a founding member of the Clash), bassist Jah Wobble, and drummer Jim Walker in June 1978. The group's line-up has changed frequently over the years; Lydon has been the sole constant member.

Following Lydon's departure from the Sex Pistols in January 1978, he sought a more experimental "anti-rock" project and formed PiL in June of that year. PiL released their debut studio album First Issue (1978), creating an abrasive, bass-heavy sound that drew on dub, noise, progressive rock and disco. PiL's second studio album Metal Box (1979) pushed their sound further into the avant-garde, and is often regarded as one of the most important albums of the post-punk era. Their third album, The Flowers of Romance, has also been cited as an influential post-punk record.

By 1984, Levene, Wobble and Walker had departed and the group was effectively a solo vehicle for Lydon, who moved toward a more accessible sound with the commercially successful studio albums This Is What You Want... This Is What You Get (1984) and Album (1986). After a late 1990s hiatus, Lydon reformed the group in 2009 and has released several further albums, including What the World Needs Now... (2015).

== History ==
=== Early career ===
Following the Sex Pistols' break-up in 1978, photographer Dennis Morris suggested that Lydon travel to Jamaica with him and Virgin Records head Richard Branson, where Branson would be scouting for emerging reggae musicians. Branson also flew American new wave band Devo to Jamaica, aiming to install Lydon as lead vocalist in the band. Devo declined the offer.

Upon returning to England, Lydon searched for musicians but it was difficult. He stated in the press: "I'm thinking about going up north for someone. They've got bands up there who are trying to be different". He approached Jah Wobble (né John Wardle) about forming a band together. The pair had been friends since the early 1970s when they attended the same school in Hackney (both belonged to a circle of friends Lydon informally dubbed "The Gang of Johns" – John Lydon, John Wardle, John Gray, and John Simon Ritchie, a.k.a. Sid Vicious). Lydon and Wobble had previously played music together during the final days of the Sex Pistols. Both had similarly broad musical tastes, and were avid fans of reggae and world music. Lydon assumed, much as he had with Sid Vicious, that Wobble would learn to play bass guitar as he went. Wobble would prove to be a natural talent. Lydon also approached guitarist Keith Levene for the new band. Levene and Lydon had become acquainted while touring in mid-1976 when Levene was still a member of the Clash. At the time, Lydon and Levene had both considered themselves outsiders even within their own bands. Jim Walker, a Canadian student newly arrived in the UK, was recruited on drums, after answering an advertisement placed in Melody Maker published on 6 May 1978.

The band began rehearsing together in mid-May 1978, although they were still unnamed. In July 1978, Lydon officially named the band "Public Image" (the "Ltd" was added when the company was incorporated in July 1978), after the Muriel Spark novel The Public Image (1968). PiL debuted in October 1978 with "Public Image", a song written while Lydon was still a member of the Sex Pistols, and discussed his feelings of being exploited by their manager Malcolm McLaren. The single was well received and reached number 9 on the UK Singles Chart, and it also performed well on import in the US.

=== Public Image: First Issue (1978) ===
In preparing their debut studio album, Public Image: First Issue, the band spent their recording budget well before the record was completed. As a result, the final album comprised eight tracks of varying sound quality, half of which were written and recorded in a rush after the money had run out. The album was released in December 1978.

The single "Public Image" was widely seen as diatribe against Malcolm McLaren and his perceived manipulation of Lydon during his career with Sex Pistols. The track "Low Life" (with its accusatory lyrics of "Egomaniac traitor", "You fell in love with your ego" and "Bourgeoisie anarchist") has also been regarded as an attack on McLaren, although Lydon has stated that the lyrics refer to Sid Vicious. The two-part song "Religion" refers contemptuously to the Catholic Church; Lydon came up with the lyrics when he was part of the Sex Pistols but he claims the other members of the band were reluctant to use them. The closing track "Fodderstompf", heavily influenced by dub, comprises nearly eight minutes of a circular bass riff, played over a Lydon/Wobble double act lampooning public outrage, love songs and teenage apathy, whilst openly acknowledging the lack of effort being put into it. The track culminates with the sound of a fire extinguisher being let off in the recording studio by Wobble. The photography for the album was shot by Dennis Morris who also created the PiL logo. Lydon disputes Morris creating the logo.

"Public Image"
"Public Image"

"PiL was the simple thing of four different people doing different drugs at different times," Wobble observed to Select. "It was only in any way together for the first two months of its existence. We had a fuckin' good drummer called Jim Walker, but he fucked off after a few months [in early 1979] and it just fell apart. Somehow it had sort of death throes that produced a couple of blinding albums."

=== Metal Box (1979) and Paris au Printemps (1980) ===
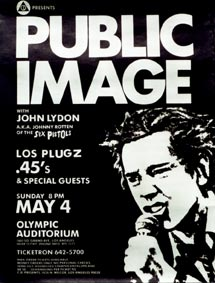
A PiL promotional poster, 1980.

"Memories"
"Memories"

The departure of Jim Walker made way for a series of new drummers. Auditions were later held at Rollerball Studios in Tooley Street, London Bridge. David Humphrey was their second drummer, who went on to record two tracks at Manor Studios in Oxford, "Swan Lake" and "Albatross", for Metal Box. "Death Disco" (a.k.a. "Swan Lake") was released as a single in 1979 and reached No. 20 in the charts. The majority of the drumming on the album was provided by Richard Dudanski (formerly of the 101ers), PiL's drummer from April to September 1979. He was replaced by Karl Burns (of the Fall), who in turn was replaced by Martin Atkins. The recording and practice sessions were chaotic; Atkins said in 2001 that his audition was playing "Bad Baby" during a recording session--a take which was taped and released on Metal Box. Atkins was PiL's drummer from 1979 to 1980 and 1982 to 1985.

Metal Box was originally released as three untitled 45-rpm 12-inch (30-cm) records packaged in a metal box resembling a film canister with an embossed PiL logo on the lid (it was later reissued in more conventional packaging as a double LP set, Second Edition), and features the band's trademark hypnotic dub reggae bass lines, glassy, arpeggiated guitar, and bleak, paranoid, stream of consciousness vocals.

PiL had a series of contentious live shows and behind-the-scenes controversies during their first American tour in 1980. Their appearance at the Grand Olympic Auditorium in Los Angeles was fraught with hostile exchanges between Lydon and the audience. Tensions offstage mounted as well. PiL demanded that they work only with local promoters, bucking the promotional machinery of Warner Bros. Records, their American label. For both the Los Angeles and San Francisco appearances, PiL agreed to work with David Ferguson and his independent CD Presents label. This business arrangement pitted the band and CD Presents in a pitched battle against San Francisco-based promoter Bill Graham, who negotiated with concert venue owners and San Francisco government officials to deprive PiL of a concert location. Fearing public outbursts if the show was cancelled, San Francisco city officials instead opted to allow the CD Presents-sponsored event to proceed.

On 17 May 1980, the group appeared on the teenage music show American Bandstand at the invitation of host Dick Clark. PiL's performance was chaotic; they abandoned lip-syncing, invited the audience onto the stage while the music played and Lydon clowned. Clark named the performance among his top 100 AB favourites.

In June 1980, Lydon and Levene were interviewed on NBC's The Tomorrow Show by host Tom Snyder. The interview was awkward (and combative at times). At one point, Snyder asked Lydon if PiL was a band to which Lydon replied with, "We ain't no band, we're a company. Simple. Nothing to do with rock and roll. Doo Da." The segment ended with Snyder apologising to the audience: "The interesting part is, is that we talked to these two gentlemen a couple of weeks ago, a pre-interview, apparently that went all just fine and it made great sense, and what I read about them this afternoon, but somehow it got a little lost in translation tonight. But that's probably my fault." Lydon re-appeared on Tom Snyder's show in 1997, and Snyder apologised about what happened that night. Lydon shook it off by saying "it's just entertainment", and the completely normal interview proceeded without difficulty.

1980 also saw the release of PiL's first live album, Paris au Printemps – also the group's last album featuring Jah Wobble. On this release's album sleeve, the band's name and all of the track titles were translated into French. The album cover was a painting by John Lydon depicting himself, Keith Levene and Jeannette Lee.

In May 1981, PiL appeared in New York at The Ritz, playing from behind a projection screen. Lydon, Levene and Jeanette Lee were joined by a new drummer, 60-year-old jazz player Sam Ulano, who had been recruited for the gig from a bar, having apparently never heard the band before. While something reminiscent of but clearly different from PiL improvised behind the screen, PiL records were played simultaneously through the PA. Lydon taunted the audience, who expected to hear familiar material (or at least see the band), and a melée erupted in which the audience pelted the stage with bottles and pulled on a tarp spread under the band, toppling equipment. The promoters cleared the hall and cancelled the next night's show, and a local media furore ignited in New York.

=== The Flowers of Romance (1981) ===
Later in 1980, Jah Wobble left the band and was not formally replaced. The resulting studio album was notable for its almost complete lack of bass parts. Martin Atkins, who had initially joined at the tail end of the Metal Box sessions, was re-recruited to drum on The Flowers of Romance. Levene had by then largely abandoned guitar in favour of synthesiser, picking up a new technique although owing a debt to Allen Ravenstine of Pere Ubu. Atkins' propulsive marching band-style drumming, the lack of bass and guitar, and Lydon's increasing lyrical abstraction made this album a difficult listen for rock fans, and contemporary reviews expressed great confusion. The record consists mostly of drums, vocals, musique concrète, and tape loops, with only gestures toward bass (played by Levene) and keyboards. The title "Flowers of Romance" was the name of a short-lived band featuring Keith Levene, Viv Albertine, and Sid Vicious in 1976. The track "Francis Massacre" was partially inspired by Lydon's incarceration in Mountjoy Prison and the track "Hymie's Him" began life as an instrumental piece intended for the score of Michael Wadleigh's crime horror film Wolfen (1981).

=== 1983–1986: Commercial Zone, This Is What You Want... and Album ===
An aborted fourth studio album recorded in 1982 was later released by Levene as Commercial Zone, which included contributions from bassist Pete Jones. Lydon and Atkins claim that Levene stole the master tapes. Atkins stayed on through a live album (one of the first digital live albums ever recorded), Live in Tokyo (1983) – in which PiL consisted of him, Lydon, and a band of session musicians—and left in 1985, following the release of This Is What You Want... This Is What You Get (1984). This album consists of re-recorded versions of five songs from Commercial Zone (several of which feature a horn section) and three new tracks (four songs from Commercial Zone were not re-recorded for the new album). PiL was moving towards a more commercial pop music and dance music direction, and while many new fans found PiL, little of their original audience (or sound) remained.

During this interim period, the band released the single "This Is Not a Love Song" in 1983, the song's lyric lampooning the anger of some fans and music press over the band's movement towards a more commercial style. The song's title was inspired by a line in the song "Her Story" (1979) by Virgin label stablemates the Flying Lizards, about bands 'selling out' their artistic principles for commercial success ("But you can still make money, by singing sweet songs of love... this is a love song"). Ironically, it gave the band their biggest international hit single, reaching No. 5 in the UK singles charts and No. 12 in the Netherlands.

A re-recorded version with harsher vocals and a brass section was included on the album This Is What You Want... This Is What You Get.

In 1985, Lydon recorded a song entitled "World Destruction" in collaboration with Afrika Bambaataa's band Time Zone and producer Bill Laswell. PiL's 1986 studio album release was simply entitled Album, Compact Disc, or Cassette, depending on the format. The cover's blue typeface and spartan design parodied generic brands; promotional photos featured Lydon in a "generic blue" suit surrounded by generic foods and drinking generic beer. Produced by Bill Laswell (despite Lydon-fuelled faction and disunion) and with many of Laswell's usual rotating cast of musicians, it also featured guitar solos by Steve Vai, considered by Vai himself to be some of his best work. Jonas Hellborg, solo bassist and at the time, member of John McLaughlin's reformed band, the Mahavishnu Orchestra, played bass on the album. Jazz great Tony Williams and legendary Cream drummer Ginger Baker drummed on the album, which also featured Ryuichi Sakamoto of the Japanese electronic music band Yellow Magic Orchestra (YMO). Controversy reared again, with claims that the album cover and title concept had been stolen from the San Francisco noise/punk band, Flipper, contemporaries of PiL, whose album, Album, featured a similarly unadorned sleeve. Flipper retaliated by naming their next album, Public Flipper Limited.

To tour Album in 1986, Lydon recruited former Magazine and Siouxsie and the Banshees guitarist John McGeoch, world music multi-instrumentalist (and former Damned guitarist) Lu Edmonds, bassist Allan Dias, and former the Pop Group and the Slits drummer Bruce Smith. (Dias had previously played with David Lloyd and Andrew Edge in Uropa Lula). As the years went on, PiL's line-up grew steadier as the sound of the albums drifted toward dance culture and drum-oriented pop music. Edmonds left due to tinnitus in 1988, and Smith left in 1990. McGeoch and Dias were members of PiL from 1986 until 1992, making them the group's longest-running members besides Lydon.

=== 1987–1992: Later career ===
PiL released the studio album Happy? in 1987, and during early 1988 were the supporting act on INXS' Kick tour in the US. Bill Laswell, who produced PiL's previous studio album, was at one point supposed to produce Happy?, but this idea fell through allegedly because Laswell wanted to replace the PiL line-up with his own session musicians (as had been the case with Album), a request to which John Lydon would not agree. Happy? was ultimately produced by Gary Langan and PiL. The album produced the single "Seattle" as well as the abortion-themed single "The Body", a sequel of sorts to the similarly titled Sex Pistols song "Bodies". In 1989, PiL toured with New Order and the Sugarcubes as "The Monsters of Alternative Rock". PiL's seventh studio album, 9 – so called as it was the band's ninth official album release, including the two live albums – appeared in early 1989 and featured the single "Disappointed". The album was produced by Stephen Hague (who was known for working with the Pet Shop Boys and New Order), Eric "E.T." Thorngren and the band.

In 1990, Public Image Ltd's song "The Order of Death" (from This is What You Want... This is What You Get) was prominently featured in Richard Stanley's film Hardware. That same year saw the release of PiL's first compilation album The Greatest Hits, So Far, which featured one new song, the environmentally themed single "Don't Ask Me". The rest of the album consisted of previously released material, though remixes of several songs were used rather than original album versions and the album remake of "This is Not a Love Song" was included rather than the original single version. Lydon claims that he wanted the album to be 28 tracks long; the eventual 14-track listing was a compromise with Virgin Records (who, according to Lydon, originally wanted only eight tracks). The compilation, which boasted album-sleeve artwork by Reg Mombassa, made No. 20 on the UK Albums Chart.

PiL's last studio album of this period, 1992's That What Is Not, included a sample from the Sex Pistols' song "God Save the Queen" in the song "Acid Drops" (the younger Lydon's voice is heard chanting the words, "No future, no future..." in the outro). Lydon disbanded the group a year later after Virgin Records refused to pay for the tour supporting the album, and Lydon had to pay for it out of his own pocket. The band's last concert was performed on 18 September 1992 with the line-up of Lydon, McGeoch, Ted Chau (guitar, keyboards), Mike Joyce of the Smiths (drums), and Russell Webb (bass guitar). Allan Dias, PiL's bassist since the spring of 1986, quit the band in the summer of 1992, some months before PiL itself went on hiatus.

=== Hiatus ===
In 1993, Lydon worked on his memoirs, first published in 1994 as Rotten: No Irish, No Blacks, No Dogs, and in 1996 he regrouped with Steve Jones, Glen Matlock and Paul Cook for the Sex Pistols' Filthy Lucre Tour. Lydon released a solo studio album, Psycho's Path, in 1997. 1999 saw the release of the 4-disc PiL compilation Plastic Box; it offered a more comprehensive retrospective of PiL's recorded output than the single-disc The Greatest Hits, So Far. Plastic Box contained a mixture of previously released and unreleased material spanning PiL's entire career, although no material from Commercial Zone or PiL's two live albums was included (in the compilation's liner notes, Lydon wrote that "this collection represents a comma not a full stop, I fully intend to carry on with PiL, and there will be more in the future.").

=== 2009–present: Reunion and new albums ===
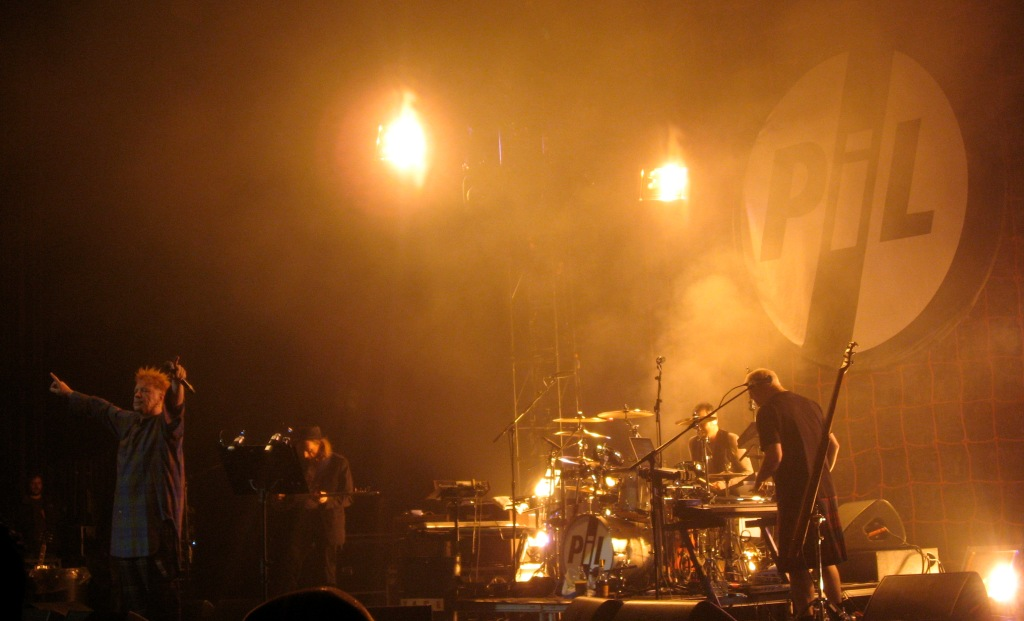
PiL performing in 2009

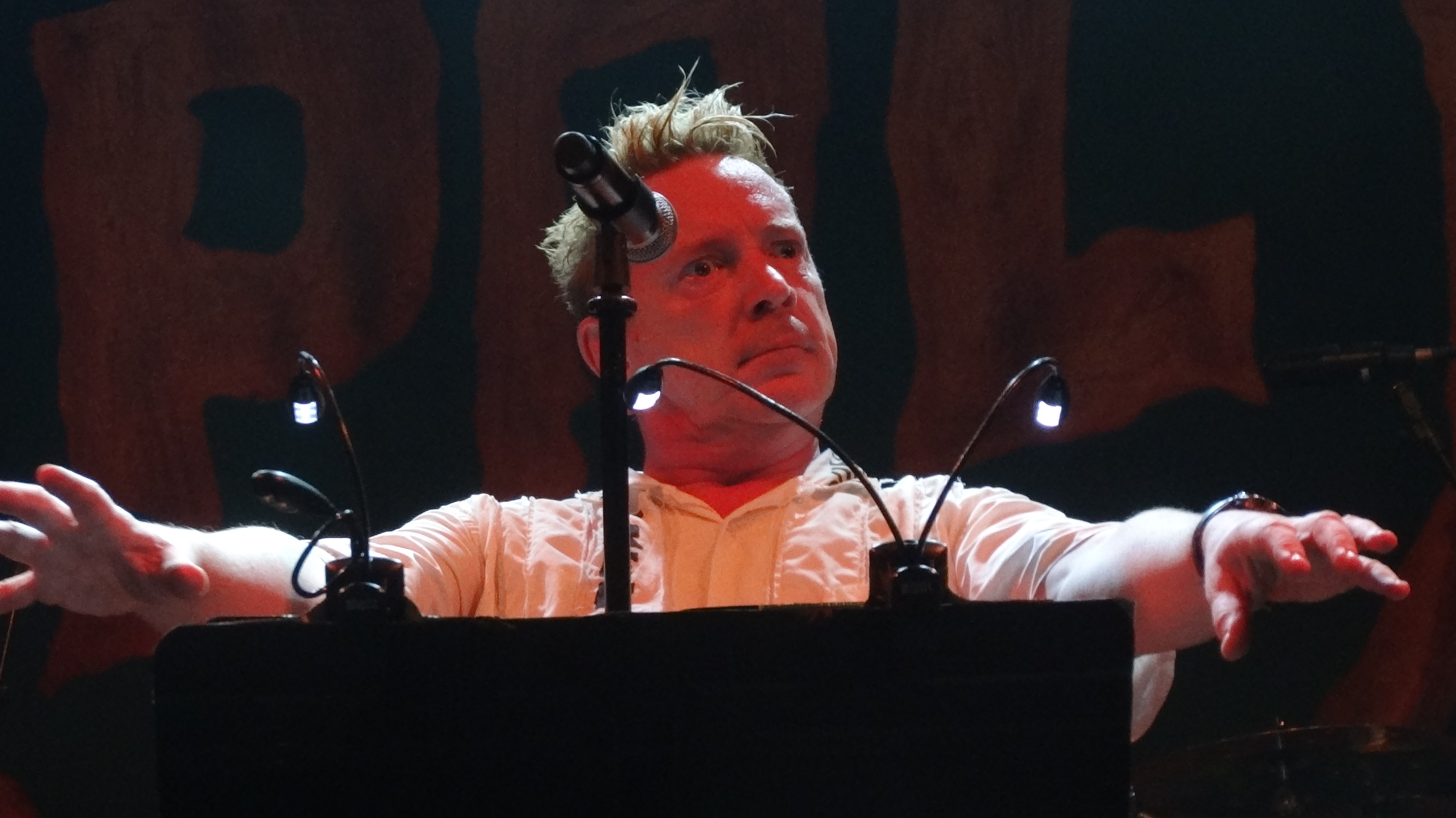
Lead vocalist John Lydon performing with the band in 2013

In September 2009 it was announced that PiL would reform for five UK shows, their first live appearance in 17 years. Lydon financed the reunion using money he earned doing a UK TV commercial for Country Life butter. "The money that I earned from that has now gone completely – lock stock and barrel – into re-forming PiL," said Lydon.

On 15 October 2009, Lydon registered the private limited company PIL Twin Limited as his new music publishing company in the UK.

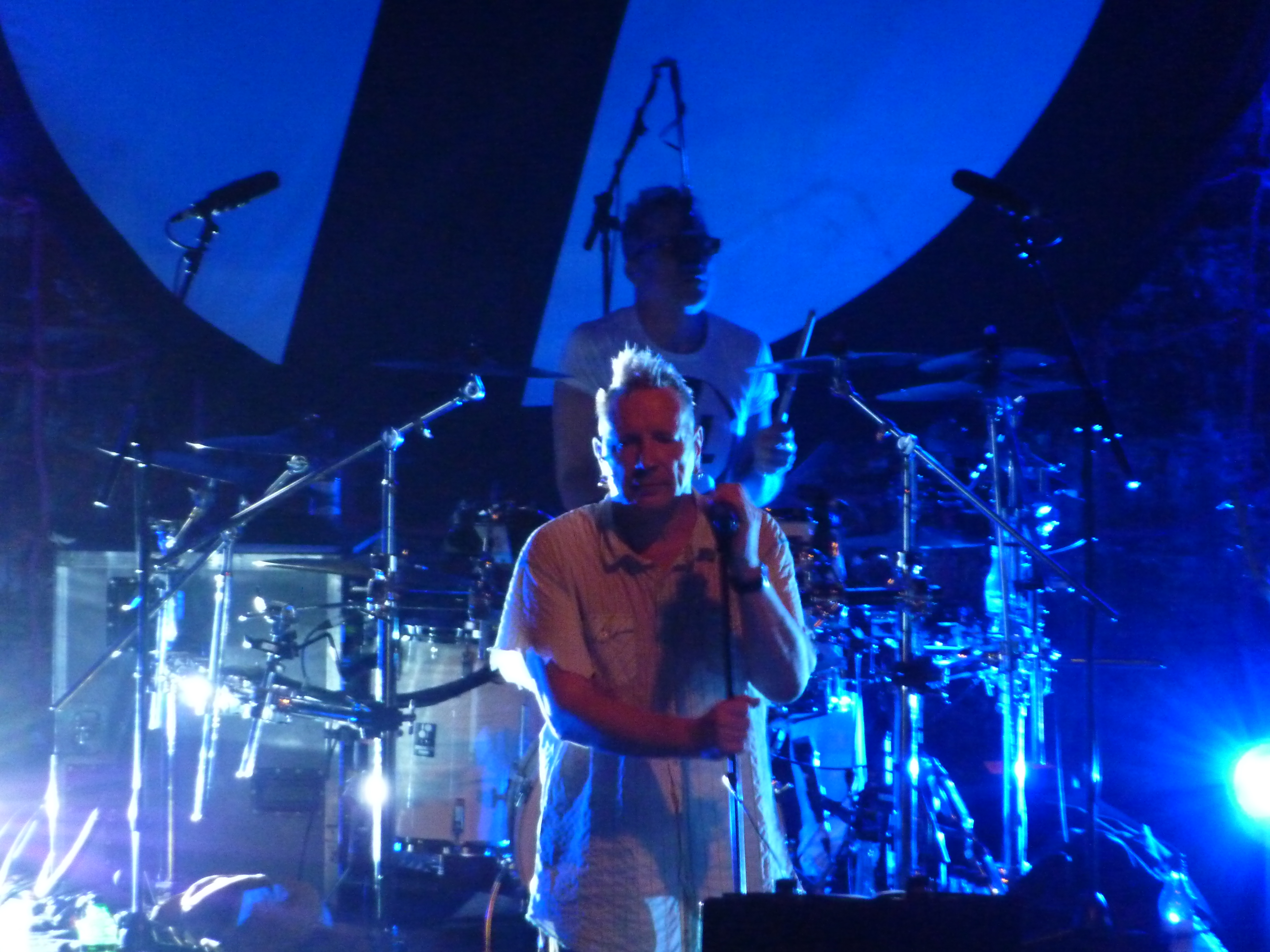
John Lydon and Bruce Smith on stage with Public Image Ltd at the Manchester Ritz during the This Is PiL tour, 7 August 2012

The new line-up (consisting of Lydon, earlier members Bruce Smith and Lu Edmonds, plus multi-instrumentalist Scott Firth) played to generally positive reviews in late 2009, coinciding with the 30th anniversary of Metal Box. However, protested Lydon, "This tour is absolutely nothing to do with an anniversary of anything… We didn't even know that Virgin were planning on releasing a very limited edition of Metal Box because they never bothered to confer with us." The tour spawned a live album, ALiFE 2009.

In April 2010, PiL began an extensive North American tour, including a sub-headlining appearance at the Coachella Festival. The band played several European concerts in July 2010 and at the Summer Sonic Festival in Japan in August 2011.

In November 2009, Lydon said PiL might re-enter the studio if they could raise enough money from their December tour or from a record company.

Over the years, Lydon has consistently been a staunchly committed, vocal and active supporter of the state of Israel : PiL went to Tel Aviv to headline the Heineken Music Conference 2010 Festival in August 2010. The group met with criticism for breaking the artistic boycott of Israel by some British musicians organised in protest over Israeli policies toward Palestinians. Lydon said in response:

I really resent the presumption that I'm going there to play to right-wing Nazi Jews. If Elvis-fucking-Costello wants to pull out of a gig in Israel because he's suddenly got this compassion for Palestinians, then good on him. But I have absolutely one rule, right? Until I see an Arab country, a Muslim country, with a democracy, I won't understand how anyone can have a problem with how they're treated.

On 30 November 2011, the band's own label PiL Official Limited was registered as a private limited company in the UK.

PiL released the vinyl-only EP One Drop in late April 2012, which was eventually made available for streaming. The new 12-track studio album, This is PiL, followed in May. This is PiL was the band's first studio album in twenty years.

On 28 July 2015, the band uploaded a promo video for lead single "Double Trouble" from their next studio album, What the World Needs Now..., via their YouTube channel. On 21 August, PiL released the single (backed with "Bettie Page") and a non-album track, "Turkey Tits". What the World Needs Now... is PiL's tenth studio album, released in September 2015. On 17 November 2015, the group played "Double Trouble" on The Late Show with Stephen Colbert.

In December 2016, the group released super deluxe editions of Metal Box and Album.

In 2018, a documentary film, The Public Image Is Rotten, was released. Also in 2018, the band released The Public Image is Rotten – Songs from the Heart, a compilation CD/DVD box set to celebrate the 40th anniversary of the band. It consists of five CDs and two DVDs that include B-sides, rarities, radio sessions, live concerts, 12" mixes and promo videos.

On 9 January 2023, it was announced that the band was one of the six acts chosen to compete in Eurosong 2023 for the chance to represent Ireland in the Eurovision Song Contest 2023. They competed with the song "Hawaii", and ultimately finished in 4th place with 18 points. The song, called by the band "the most personal piece of songwriting", was released as a single, and was described as a love letter to Lydon's wife, Nora Forster. After her death on 5 April, the band announced their studio album End of World, released on 11 August, along with a new European tour. Public Image Limited has been touring frequently as of 2025 and 2026, with concerts planned into 2027.

== Musical style and legacy ==
Beginning as a post-punk group, PiL went on to incorporate influences from multiple genres into their music, including krautrock, dub, alternative rock and pop. The British magazine NME wrote in a 1999 review that the band was "arguably the first post-rock group."

Lydon has cited Captain Beefheart, Iggy Pop and the Stooges and Kraftwerk as foundational influences for the band. Their first three albums, Public Image: First Issue, Metal Box, and The Flowers of Romance are regarded as early, pioneering records in the development of post-punk. However, after the departure of Levene, Wobble, and Walker, the band moved towards a more commercial New wave sound with the album This Is What You Want... This Is What You Get, continuing in this direction until their disbandment in 1992. Upon reuniting in 2009, the band returned to their experimental roots.

The band has been cited as an influence by the likes of Liars, Nirvana, Massive Attack, Red Hot Chili Peppers, U2, and Melvins.

== Members ==
Current members

- John Lydon – lead vocals, keyboards, violin, saxophone (1978–1992, 2009–present)
- Lu Edmonds – guitars, keyboards, saz, banjo, backing vocals (1986–1988, 2009–present)
- Scott Firth – bass, keyboards, synthesisers, backing vocals (2009–present)
- Mark Roberts – drums (2025–present)

== Discography ==
Studio albums

- Public Image: First Issue (1978)
- Metal Box (1979)
- The Flowers of Romance (1981)
- This Is What You Want... This Is What You Get (1984)
- Album (1986)
- Happy? (1987)
- 9 (1989)
- That What Is Not (1992)
- This Is PiL (2012)
- What the World Needs Now... (2015)
- End of World (2023)

== Bibliography ==
- Heylin, Clinton (1989). Public Image Limited: Rise/Fall. London: Omnibus Press. ISBN 0-7119-1684-5.
- Reynolds, Simon. "Heavy metal: The legacy of PiL and Metal box", Frieze 111 : UK, 2007
- Sullivan-Burke, Rory (April 2022). The Light Pours Out of Me: The Authorised Biography of John McGeoch. Omnibus Press. ISBN 978-1913172664.
