= Public Image (song) =

Single by Public Image Ltd

from the album Public Image: First Issue
- A-side: "Public Image"
- B-side: "The Cowboy Song"
- Released: 13 October 1978 (UK)
- Recorded: July 1978
- Studio: Advision Studios and Wessex Sound Studios in London
- Genre: New wave
- Length: 2:58
- Label: Virgin VS 228
- Songwriters: John Lydon, Keith Levene, Jah Wobble and Jim Walker
- Producer: Public Image Ltd

Public Image Ltd singles chronology
"Public Image" (1978)	"Death Disco" (1979)

"Public Image" is the debut single by Public Image Ltd. It reached number nine on the UK Singles Chart. The lyrics were written when band co-founder John Lydon was a member of the Sex Pistols. The song addresses Lydon's feelings of being exploited in the Sex Pistols by Malcolm McLaren and the press. Along with being released as a single, it appeared on PiL's 1978 debut album Public Image: First Issue.

On the song, PiL leader John Lydon has said:

'Public Image', despite what most of the press seemed to misinterpret it to be, is not about the fans at all, it's a slagging of the group I used to be in. It's what I went through from my own group. They never bothered to listen to what I was fucking singing, they don't even know the words to my songs. They never bothered to listen, it was like, 'Here's a tune, write some words to it.' So I did. They never questioned it. I found that offensive, it meant I was literally wasting my time, 'cause if you ain't working with people that are on the same level then you ain't doing anything. The rest of the band and Malcolm never bothered to find out if I could sing, they just took me as an image. It was as basic as that, they really were as dull as that. After a year of it they were going 'Why don't you have your hair this colour this year?' And I was going 'Oh God, a brick wall, I'm fighting a brick wall!' They don't understand even now.

It entered the UK Singles chart on 21 October 1978 at number 21. The single then peaked at number 9 on 4 November 1978.

== Recording ==
At the start of the single, Lydon repeats "Hello, hello", a wholly spontaneous ad lib made as he wanted to make sure the microphone was turned on. Record Collector wrote that it is considered "one of the great intros". Lydon later said it reminded him of the cowbell in the Rolling Stones' non-album single "Honky Tonk Women" (1969), adding: "It's slightly off-beat, isn’t it? You go, 'Eh? What's the note structure there?' Haha! It's very nice to be complimented like that but it really was spur of the moment, mostly instinctive. But as I say, instincts are best learned."

== Single ==
The single was originally packaged in a fake newspaper that makes outrageous statements such as "Refused To Play Russian Roulette", "No one's Innocent, Except Us", "Donut's Laugh saves life" (Donut being a nickname for Jim Walker) and "The Girl Who Drove Me To Tea" among others. The B-side, "The Cowboy Song", was designed to mock people buying the record (the track's only sensical rhythm is a bassline played over nonsensical yelling), much to the dismay of drummer Jim Walker.

NME named it the 242nd greatest song of all time in 2014. The song's bass line was named as the 18th best bassline of all time by Stylus Magazine in 2005.

Track Listing

1. "Public Image" – 2:58
2. "The Cowboy Song" – 2:17

=== Live performances ===
While "Public Image" has been performed live for much of the band's existence, "The Cowboy Song" was only performed live twice, in a row, at their debut performance in Brussels, Belgium.

=== Cover versions ===
The song has been covered by The Germs, Pearl Jam, Ministry, Revolting Cocks, Long Ryders, Feeder, Menswear, Scrawl, and Alphabeat.

== Personnel ==
Public Image Ltd

- John Lydon – vocals
- Keith Levene – guitar
- Jah Wobble – bass
- Jim Walker – drums

== Chart performance ==
Chart (1978)	Peak position
Ireland (IRMA)	15
UK Singles (Official Charts)	9
