= Public Image: First Issue =

Public Image Limited: Public Image/First Issue

Studio album by Public Image Ltd
- Released: 8 December 1978
- Recorded: July – November 1978
- Studios: The Manor (Shipton-on-Cherwell, England); Wessex (London); Gooseberry Sound; Townhouse (London); Advision (London)
- Genre: Post-punk
- Length: 39:54
- Label: Virgin
- Producer: Public Image Ltd

Public Image Ltd chronology
Public Image Limited: Public Image/First Issue (1978)	Metal Box (1979)

Singles from Public Image: First Issue
- 1. "Public Image" Released: 13 October 1978

Public Image: First Issue is the debut studio album by the English rock band Public Image Ltd, released on 8 December 1978 by record label Virgin. The album took 35 years to be released in the United States, following a canceled release in 1979.

Coming off of lead vocalist John Lydon's work with Sex Pistols, the album was a significant deviation from that band's straightforward punk style. While still featuring elements of punk rock, particularly on the song "Public Image", the album features excursions into dub, reggae, and Krautrock.

Upon its release, it reached number 22 in the UK Album Charts. Despite its modest commercial success, it was met with largely negative feedback critically, but received acclaim in retrospective reviews and is now considered one of the pioneering records in the development of post-punk, and is additionally regarded as a forerunner of post-rock music. It received Silver certification in the UK.

== Background ==
John Lydon had helped popularize and pioneer Punk rock in the United Kingdom with his previous band, Sex Pistols. However, after releasing their debut album, Lydon became disillusioned with the band and the movement, famously saying at the end of their last concert, "Ever get the feeling that you've been cheated?"

Upon leaving the band after this concert, Lydon would search for musicians to form a new band, eventually recruiting Jah Wobble, Keith Levene, and Jim Walker.

== Recording ==
"Public Image", the debut single, was recorded first. Recording started on a Monday in mid-July 1978 (most probably 10 or 17 July) at Advision Studios with engineer John Leckie and assistant engineer Kenneth Vaughan Thomas. For mixing and overdubs, the band then went into Wessex Studios with engineer Bill Price and assistant engineer Jeremy Green.

According to engineer John Leckie, "I [...] came down Monday morning from The Manor after a few hours' sleep to Advision Studios, a studio I hadn't worked in before [...] I engineered the session [...] Keith Levene took the multi-track tape home that night and came in the next day having forgotten it and accused me of stealing it! The track was pretty much a live take with Levene's guitar double-tracked. John Lydon did his vocal through a Space Echo, dub-style. I did a rough mix and went home. The next day the band never showed up and my rough mix was the record. I got no credit but Richard Branson did give me £250! It wasn't stressful, just a lot of fun!"

The other engineer, Bill Price, said something similar: "They'd recorded it and he wasn't quite happy, so he came to me to mix and do overdubs. Johnny was nominally in charge but he would look over his shoulder and ask Jah 'Is this the right direction?'"

On Saturday, 22 July 1978, the music press reported that the band had been in the recording studio; the following week, Virgin Records announced that PiL's debut single would be released on 8 September 1978.

After Public Image, the entire first side of the record was recorded in the autumn of 1978 at Townhouse Studios and The Manor Studio with engineer Mick Glossop.

The last three songs on the second side were recorded at Gooseberry Sound Studios, a cheap reggae studio used because the band had run out of money, with engineer Mark Lusardi and assistant engineer Jon Caffery. Lydon knew the studio from the recording of Sex Pistols demos in January 1977.

By late September 1978, the recording of the album was finished. The band had briefly considered including an alternative version of "Public Image" with different lyrics on the album, a plan that was finally rejected.

In November or December 1978, Wobble and Levene returned to Gooseberry Sound Studios to record a 12-inch EP, Steel Leg V. the Electric Dread, with guest vocalists Vince Bracken and Don Letts.

== Release ==
The album was released on 8 December 1978. The album saw modest commercial success, peaking at No. 22 on the Official Albums Chart in the UK, and would later be certified silver in the UK. It would also chart in Australia and New Zealand.

In 1979, NME reported that a court in Malta had halted sales of the album because the lyrics of "Religion" offended public morals and decency.

=== Cancelled American release ===
On 9 February 1979, Warner Bros. Recording Studios in North Hollywood manufactured a test pressing of the album for PiL's American label, Warner Bros. Records. The album's sound was considered too non-commercial for an American release, and PiL were asked to re-record parts of it. Although the band recorded new versions of some tracks between March and May 1979, the album was never released in the USA. However, in 1980 Warner Bros. released the song "Public Image" on the compilation album Troublemakers, the only album track released in the USA until the 2013 release of the entire album.

The re-recorded version of "Fodderstompf" was released under the title "Megga Mix" as the B-side of the "Death Disco" 12" single (29 June 1979). The track was later included on the PiL compilations Plastic Box (1999) and Metal Box: Super Deluxe Edition (2016); it was the only track from the February 1979 First Issue re-recording sessions to be officially released until 2025 (see below).

On 18 June 2013, the UK version of the album was finally officially released in the US via Light in the Attic Records. In 2025, the band announced that the 1979 US mix would finally be publicly released for Record Store Day of that year, featuring alternate artwork. It peaked at number 29 on the Billboard US Indie Store Album Sales chart.

== Reception ==
Professional ratings
Review scores
Source	Rating
AllMusic	4/5 stars
Blurt	4/5 stars
Clash	9/10
Pitchfork	9.0/10
PopMatters	7/10
Record Collector	4/5 stars
The Rolling Stone Album Guide	3/5 stars
Smash Hits	5/10
Sounds	2/5 stars
Spin Alternative Record Guide	8/10

Upon its release, Public Image: First Issue received a 2- (out of 5) star review in Sounds. Reviewer Pete Silverton said that the single is the "Only wholly worthwhile track on the album." He dubbed the rest of the songs as "morbid directionless sounds with Rotten's poetry running just behind it." Nick Kent of NME was similarly negative, quipping that "unfortunately the 'image', public or otherwise, is a good deal less limited than many of the more practical factors involved in this venture."

However, the album is now considered a groundbreaking post-punk classic. AllMusic critic Uncle Dave Lewis stated that the record "helped set the pace" for the post-punk genre, adding that it was "among a select few 1978 albums that had something lasting to say about the future of rock music." Pitchfork's Stuart Berman wrote, "First Issue's industrial-strength stompers anticipate the scabrous art-punk of the Jesus Lizard and Slint, while Levene's guitar curlicues on 'Public Image' are the stuff Daydream Nations are made of." Public Image: First Issue is, along with Metal Box, included in the book 1001 Albums You Must Hear Before You Die.

== Track listing ==
=== Original 1978 release ===
All lyrics are written by John Lydon; all music is composed by Public Image Ltd.

Side one
No.	Title	Length
1.	"Theme"	9:05
2.	"Religion I"	1:40
3.	"Religion II"	5:40
4.	"Annalisa"	6:00

Side two
No.	Title	Length
5.	"Public Image"	2:58
6.	"Low Life"	3:35
7.	"Attack"	2:55
8.	"Fodderstompf"	7:40
Total length:		39:54

2013 US reissue bonus tracks
No.	Title	Length
9.	"The Cowboy Song"	2:19
10.	"Interview with John Lydon (BBC Radio 1, Rock On, 28 October 1978)"	56:54

=== Aborted 1979 US mix ===
On 12 April 2025, the aborted 1979 US mix of the album officially got a release in the form of a limited Record Store Day vinyl pressing.

Side one
No.	Title	Length
1.	"Theme"	8:59
2.	"Annalisa"	10:00

Side two
No.	Title	Length
3.	"Public Image"	3:01
4.	"Low Life"	3:51
5.	"Attack"	2:45
6.	"Swan Lake"	6:44
Total length:		35:20

== Personnel ==
Public Image Limited

- John Lydon – vocals, piano
- Keith Levene – guitar, synthesiser
- Jah Wobble – bass, vocals and fire extinguisher on "Fodderstompf"
- Jim Walker – drums

== Charts ==
Chart (1978–79)	Peak position
Australian Albums (Kent Music Report)	77
New Zealand Albums (RMNZ)	18
UK Albums (Official Charts)	22

Chart (2023)	Peak position
Scottish Albums (Official Charts)	59
UK Independent Albums (Official Charts)	18

Chart (2025)	Peak position
US Indie Store Album Sales (Billboard)	29

== Certifications ==
Region	Certification	Certified units/sales
United Kingdom (BPI)	Silver	60,000^{^}
^{^} Shipments figures based on certification alone.
