= Happy? (Public Image Ltd album) =

Studio album by Public Image Ltd
- Released: 14 September 1987
- Recorded: 1987
- Studio: The Manor Studio, Shipton-on-Cherwell; Great Linford Manor Studios, Milton Keynes
- Genre: Alternative dance; alternative rock
- Length: 35:17
- Label: Virgin
- Producer: Gary Langan; Public Image Ltd

Public Image Ltd chronology
Album (1986)	Happy? (1987)	9 (1989)

Singles from Happy?
- 1. "Seattle" Released: 1987; 2. "The Body" Released: 1987

Professional ratings
Review scores
Source	Rating
AllMusic	3/5 stars
Christgau's Record Guide	B
Encyclopedia of Popular Music	3/5 stars
The Great Rock Discography	6/10
MusicHound	3/5
Number One	4/5 stars
Record Mirror	4/5
The Rolling Stone Album Guide	2.5/5 stars
Spin Alternative Record Guide	6/10

Happy? is the sixth studio album by English rock band Public Image Ltd, released on 14 September 1987. It reached number 40 in the UK Album Charts.

== Cover artwork ==
The cover art by Richard Evans is a homage to the style of Austrian artist Friedensreich Hundertwasser, and an acknowledgement is made in the liner notes.

== Track listing ==
All tracks composed by Dias, Edmonds, McGeoch, Lydon and Smith

No.	Title	Length
1.	"Seattle"	3:40
2.	"Rules and Regulations"	4:32
3.	"The Body"	3:11
4.	"Save Me"	4:49
5.	"Hard Times"	3:42
6.	"Open and Revolving"	4:01
7.	"Angry"	4:13
8.	"Fat Chance Hotel" (includes hidden instrumental of Save Me)	7:03

== Personnel ==
Public Image Ltd.

- John Lydon – vocals
- John McGeoch – guitar
- Lu Edmonds – guitar, keyboards
- Allan Dias – bass
- Bruce Smith – drums

== Charts ==
Chart (1987)	Peak position
UK Albums (OCC)	40
US Billboard 200	169
