= Keith Levene =

English musician (1957–2022)

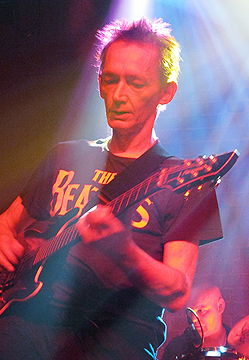
- Levene in 2012

Background information
- Born: Julian Keith Levene; 18 July 1957; London, England
- Died: 11 November 2022 (aged 65) Norfolk, England
- Genres: Punk rock; post-punk; experimental rock
- Occupations: Musician; composer; record producer
- Instruments: Guitar; keyboards; percussion
- Years active: 1974–2022
- Labels: EMI/Virgin; Underground, Inc.
- Formerly of: The Clash; The Flowers of Romance; Public Image Ltd; Cowboys International
- Spouse(s): Lori Montana (divorced); Shelly da Cunha (divorced)

Julian Keith Levene (18 July 1957 – 11 November 2022) was an English musician who was a founding member of both the Clash and Public Image Ltd (PiL). While Levene was in PiL, their debut studio album Public Image: First Issue (1978) reached No. 22 on the UK album charts, and its lead track "Public Image" broke the top 10 UK singles chart.

Levene was born and raised in London, and although initially influenced by progressive rock, his musical taste changed after meeting fellow Clash founder Mick Jones. His punk and post-punk guitar sounds have been described as "both melodic and discordant, sonorous and violent".

== Early years and success ==
Levene was born in Muswell Hill, London on 18 July 1957. His father was Jewish. He was a fan of early ska, reggae, dub music, the Beatles and progressive rock; at fifteen he worked as a roadie for Yes on their Close to the Edge tour, "cleaning Alan White's cymbals" amongst other mundane duties.

He became a founding member of the Flowers of Romance and notably the Clash, when in 1976, he helped persuade Joe Strummer to leave the pub rock band the 101ers and join the Clash. Although he left the band before their first studio recordings, he co-wrote "What's My Name", which appeared on their first album. Levene would later document his time with the Clash in his autobiography I WaS a TeeN GuiTariST 4 the CLaSH! When interviewed about the book, Levene recalled:

I was a kid, I was into all sorts of music, The Beatles, reggae, and at the time, prog rock. I’d just finished a tour with Yes as a roadie, which is another story also explained in the book. So basically you’re hanging out with me from when I was about 15 when I got a job with Yes, and then I didn’t get kicked off the tour, but I kinda got told not to come back on another one. It was amazing for me and then, unplanned I started making this migration to West London and I tell you what happened, I take you there.

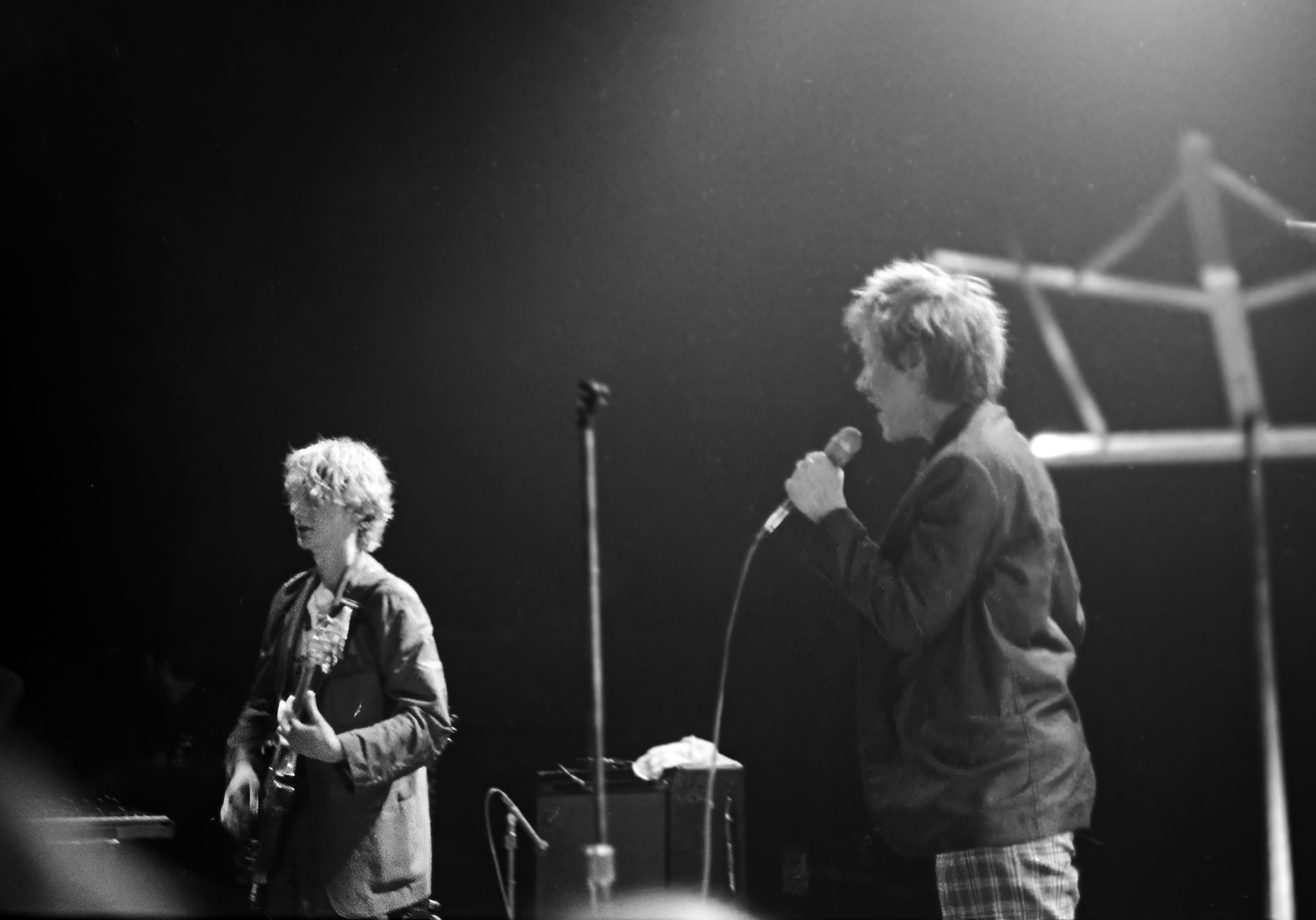
Levene (left) and John Lydon performing with Public Image Ltd in 1980

After the late 1970s British punk group the Sex Pistols disbanded, Levene and their lead singer John Lydon co-founded Public Image Ltd (PiL) in May 1978. He played on Travis Bean metal-neck guitars. He was involved in the writing, performing and producing of PiL's early albums: First Issue, Metal Box and Flowers of Romance. While playing with PiL, their 1978 debut album Public Image: First Issue reached No 22 in the UK album charts, while the lead track "Public Image", broke the top 10 single chart.

Levene left PiL in 1983 due to creative differences over what would eventually become the band's fourth album, This Is What You Want... This Is What You Get. In 1984, he released the original versions of the songs on his own label under the title Commercial Zone; the original working title of the album. In 1985, he moved to Los Angeles where he formed a company with his second wife, journalist Shelly da Cunha.

== Later years ==
:In the early 1980s, Levene played guitar and keyboards on roots reggae vocal and dub discomix releases from Bim Sherman, Jah Woosh, Singers and Players, Prince Far I and Style Scott's Dub Syndicate. Levene recorded "Devious Woman" with Bim Sherman and Singers & Players, which also featured on the film soundtrack of Smithereens starring Richard Hell, and in 1982, the dub version of the track was released by New Age Steppers and Creation Rebel on the Threat to Creation album. In mid-1986, Levene was asked to produce demos for the album The Uplift Mofo Party Plan by the Red Hot Chili Peppers at Master Control in Burbank with engineers Steve Catania and Dan Nebenzal. Also in 1986, Levene worked with DJ Matt Dike, experimenting with sampling techniques and hip-hop for Ice-T and Tone Loc on their early recordings for Delicious. In 1989, he released his first solo release, Violent Opposition, on which members of the Red Hot Chili Peppers performed.

At an impromptu appearance at the Musicport Festival in Bridlington Spa on 24 October 2010, where they were joined by vocalist Nathan Maverick, Levene returned with former PiL bassist Jah Wobble. In 2011 Levene contributed to three tracks on the album Psychic Life, a collaboration between Wobble and Lonelady.

In early 2012, after some planned Japan gigs were cancelled because of visa issues, Levene and Wobble played various venues in England, Wales and Germany as Metal Box in Dub, followed by the release of a four-song EP, Yin & Yang. In 2014, Levene travelled to Prague to record the album Commercial Zone 2014, funded by a crowdsourcing campaign at Indiegogo. Tim Peacock of Record Collector noted that it was "recorded in isolation at Prague's Faust Studios", and that the album is in actuality an offering of new material. Peacock stated: "It's primarily instrumental in design, veering from the chilled, scene-stealing Behind the Law to the synth-heavy Kraftwerk-ian noir of They Came to Dance."

In a 2014 interview from Prague regarding Commercial Zone 2014, Levene stated:

People kept asking 'when are you doing an autobiography?' I said 'I’m not, why would I do one?' Well, that all changed and I started doing a ton of interviews with Kathy DiTondo, talking about the times, the people, the places and it was quite fucking heavy therapy. She’d be asking me questions and some of it would be the same old story, and I’d think I’ve told this story a million times, boring, but I’m telling her because she wants to know genuinely and she thinks its important. Then I’m realising, fuck – this is heavy duty, this hurts. So what it evolved into was quite good for me. We were doing Diary of a Non-Punk Rocker, we were zooming in on areas of my life... We didn’t plan it this way, it fell into place this way. We were doing this Commercial Zone 2014 campaign, and offered previews from Diary. Kathy DiTondo came up with 'I was A Teenage Guitarist 4 The Clash' and I said 'fucking good'. Then I said “let’s do it Commercial Zone style” hand made and with the covers and so on.

== Death ==
Levene died from complications of liver cancer at his home in Norfolk on 11 November 2022, aged 65.

== Personal life ==
Levene married his first wife, Lori Montana, an American musician. The two had a son named Kirk and later divorced. Keith's second marriage was to Shelly da Cunha, though it also ended in divorce. He later lived with his partner, Kate Ransford.

== Influences and style ==
Levene cited guitarist Steve Howe of Yes as one of his main influences and "the greatest fucking guitarist in the world", and prog rock as a genre he particularly liked.

Describing the evolution of his style, he said in a 2001 interview that "once I got good enough to know the rules, I didn't want to be like any other guitarist. I didn't go out of my way to be different. I just had an ear for what was wrong. So if I did something that was wrong, i.e. made a mistake or did something that wasn't in key, I was open-minded enough to listen to it again."

== Legacy ==
According to John Frusciante of the Red Hot Chili Peppers, Levene's style was "spectacular...[and he]...explored the possibilities of what you can do with the guitar". Upon his death, Massive Attack described Levene as an "artist, architect and re-inventor of punk rock". Andy Bell of Ride and Mike Scott of the Waterboys also paid tribute to him on social media.

== Discography ==
=== Studio albums ===
- Violent Opposition (Taang!/Emergo/Rykodisc 1989)
- Murder Global Demos (Archive 2008)
- Yin and Yang (Cherry Red 2012) (Jah Wobble & Keith Levene)
- Search 4 Absolute Zero (self-released 2013, Gonzo Multimedia 2014)
- Commercial Zone 2014 (self-released 2014)

=== Extended Play ===
- Back Too Black (Iridescence 1987)
- Keith Levene's Violent Opposition (Fundamental/Taang! 1988)
- Looking for Something (Taang! 1988)
- Murder Global: Killer in the Crowd (self-released 2002, Underground, Inc. 2004)
- EP aka Mississippi (Pressure Sounds/30 Hertz 2012) (Jah Wobble & Keith Levene)
