= Album (Public Image Ltd album) =

Album/Cassette/Compact Disc

Studio album by Public Image Ltd
- Released: 27 January 1986
- Recorded: 1985
- Studios: Electric Lady, New York City; Power Station, New York City; Quadrasonic Sound, New York City; RPM, New York City, New York, US
- Genres: Alternative rock; heavy rock
- Length: 40:55
- Labels: Virgin; Elektra
- Producers: John Lydon; Bill Laswell

Public Image Ltd chronology
This Is What You Want... This Is What You Get (1984)	Album/Cassette/Compact Disc (1986)	Happy? (1987)

Cover of CD issue

Singles from Album
- 1. "Rise" Released: 20 January 1986; 2. "Home" Released: 21 April 1986

Professional ratings
Review scores
Source	Rating
AllMusic	2.5/5 stars
Encyclopedia of Popular Music	3/5 stars
The Great Rock Discography	7/10
The Line of Best Fit	6.5/10
Mojo	4/5 stars
MusicHound	5/5
PopMatters	8/10
The Rolling Stone Album Guide	2.5/5 stars
Uncut	4/5 stars
The Village Voice	B+

Album (also known as Compact Disc, Cassette, or mp3 depending on the format) is the fifth studio album by the English rock band Public Image Ltd, released on 27 January 1986 by Virgin and Elektra Records. In a departure from their previous releases, John Lydon was advised by trusted music producer Bill Laswell to take on an all-star cast of session and trusted musicians, including Steve Vai, Ginger Baker, Bernie Worrell, Tony Williams, Ryuichi Sakamoto of the Yellow Magic Orchestra and Malachi Favors of the Art Ensemble Of Chicago. The resulting album gave PiL one of its highest-charting songs, "Rise".

== Composition credits ==
Most of the songs were written by Lydon with Mark Schulz and Jebin Bruni and registered in September and October 1985, such as "Round and Round (European Cars)", "Fairweather Friend", "Fishing", "Black Rubber Bag", and "Things in Ease". "Fairweather Friend" featured originally music written by Schulz and Bruni. An unrecorded Lydon/Schulz composition "Animal" was registered, too. Schulz and PIL tour bassist Bret Helm had previously registered a further (presumably non-PIL, therefore unused) composition called "Cat Rap".

John Lydon: "Most of the songs on the 'Album', for instance, were written at home and put onto demonstration tapes. But I didn't think the [1984/85 touring] band were good enough or experienced enough really to, like, record the song properly. And that's why I use session people. [By using session musicians] the songs obviously changed – their shape, and not their direction". "I had a live band before recording took place and a lot of material together before going into the studio. But the band was totally inexperienced, they would have put the budget up by an incredible amount. So we decided to use session people". "I make records for myself. I want them to be completely precise. Accuracy is very important to me. Otherwise it's bad work and a waste of my time, and I really don't want to waste my time. There must be a conclusion to what you do, no vagueness. There must be a sense of completeness. Every song is an emotion and it has to succeed as that, otherwise you've failed. It's bad work. That annoys me. Bad work from anyone just annoys me. I just don't need it".

Producer Bill Laswell: "When we did PiL he had put a band together in California of some kids. And I had sort of decided to make a heavy group, so I invited Tony Williams, Ginger Baker, Steve Vai, and all these people came. We fired John's band and there were many nights of really harsh arguing in bars. When the smoke cleared, we made sort of a classic record, an unusual record for the time". Ginger Baker's inclusion was coincidental, given that the NME had published an April Fools joke press release in 1981 indicating that Baker was joining the band.

Originally, former Captain Beefheart drummer Robert Williams was hired to play on the album after he had successfully auditioned for the band and started rehearsing with them, only to be informed a short while later that the whole band was fired and the album would be recorded with hired session musicians.

== Artwork and packaging ==
The album's artwork was deliberately generic, with each release being named after its format. The original LP and 7" labels simply read "Label". The packaging concept was a pastiche of the generic brand products manufactured in the early 1980s; it was visually similar to those sold at the Ralphs supermarket chain (dark-blue lettering and light blue stripe over white ground) in the USA.

In 1982, Flipper, a punk rock band from San Francisco, California, had released an album with the same concept and a near-identical name, Album – Generic Flipper, a pastiche of generic products manufactured for Lucky Stores supermarket chain (black lettering over yellow ground). Later in 1986, Flipper retaliated by releasing a live album titled Public Flipper Limited Live 1980–1985.

The packaging concept was used on several other releases by the band from this period. The 7" single of "Rise" was called "Single" whilst the 12" single was called "12-inch Single". The music video had the title card "Video", and a 1986 compilation of music videos by the band was titled Videos. Each release used the same basic design as the LP, CD and cassette covers, although second single "Home" was issued under its own name. A 1990 boxed set of Public Image Limited albums was called Box, and a 2010 deluxe reissue of the album included "Poster" – an art print – and a making-of book titled "Book". The 2012 CD remaster of the album is titled Album. There is also a Public Image Ltd. tribute album whose cover is designed in homage to the album cover style, titled Tribute.

== Recording sessions ==
The album was recorded in late 1985 in New York. Ginger Baker's and Tony Williams' drums were recorded at Power Station by engineer Jason Corsaro. Steve Vai's lead guitar parts were recorded at Electric Lady Studios and the rest of the album at RPM Studios and Quad Recording Studios, all engineered by Robert Musso. The recording took three weeks, followed by one week of mixing the album at The Power Station.

In the liner notes of PiL's Plastic Box compilation (1999), Lydon remarked that Album was "almost like a solo album" since he was working on his own with several musicians. He said that Miles Davis came into the studio while the album was being recorded and commented that Lydon sang like Davis played the trumpet. Lydon said it was "still the best thing anyone's ever said to me." It was revealed in the liner notes to the super deluxe edition that it was actually Ornette Coleman, not Davis, who said that.

Lead guitarist Steve Vai: "Bill Laswell, the producer, called and I flew in and out of New York from Alcatrazz shows to cut the parts. I did basically all the guitar parts in two days. Bill Laswell took a very interesting approach to the production of this disc. Some of the material I'd never heard and just went in and started playing on it. At the end, Johnny Lydon came in and liked it [...] There was the consideration of putting a band together – him, myself, Bill Laswell on bass and Ginger Baker on drums. Would have been quite a band". "I went in a day and did everything, then I flew back out on tour. And then I went in for another half-day, and Lydon came in on the second day. He's just like ultracool and it's the first time he's heard any of my parts and he goes 'This is fucking great, man, how did you fucking know I wanted it like that?' [...] We were thinking about turning it into a band – me, him, Bill Laswell and Ginger Baker, but well, I was doing some other things, you know? It would have been cool. To this day that's one of the projects I'm most proud of". "John Lydon came in when I was done, they were playing a track back, and he made a grimace and said 'Fookin' great man!' in that way of his. So that was funny. I'd obviously done okay".

Roger Trilling (Bill Laswell's manager): "I wasn't there, but apparently Ginger played for Bill in his barn. Just solo with the horses there, apparently the trees swayed and the flowers cried. The drum god would return. One small step for Ginger, one giant leap for John Lydon. The rest of the cast was quickly assembled – Tony Williams, Steve Vai, Bernie [Worrell], Nicky [Skopelitis], Aïyb [Dieng]. First we recorded the drums, with Jason Corsaro in the Power Station and its huge concrete resounding garage. Then we moved over to Quad for bass, keyboards and rhythm guitar. I would give John bulletins as we drank beer in bars – 'Today Steve Turre blew into conch shells, tomorrow a didgeridoo. Oh, Sakamoto did great today!' John grew wary, restive, even aggravated. Howard Thompson, in charge for Elektra, was even more importunate, I remember at one point physically barring him from getting into the elevator. We recorded a few days of Vai at Electric Lady, and then moved over to RPM for three days of vocals. John, I think, got a cassette the evening before. The idea was to get him on the initial take, and if it didn't work, keep the tapes, which was Bill's music anyway. Well, John's declamations were eloquent ones and no less aggressive or irritating than the music. Everyone was pleased, and though I remember John's presence in the anteroom during the mix, what I mostly remember is an all-night Korean restaurant, where we would start drinking at three, four, or five in the morning."

== Track listing ==
Listed on the LP sleeve as "Ingredients"

No.	Title	Writer(s)	Length
1.	"F.F.F."	John Lydon, Bill Laswell	5:32
2.	"Rise"	Lydon, Laswell	6:05
3.	"Fishing"	Lydon, Jebin Bruni, Mark Schulz	5:20
4.	"Round"	Lydon, Schulz	4:24
5.	"Bags"	Lydon, Bruni, Schulz	5:28
6.	"Home"	Lydon, Laswell	5:49
7.	"Ease"	Lydon, Bruni	8:09
Total length:			40:55

"Home" reached number seventy five on the UK Singles Chart. Steve Vai contributed his guitar work to the track.

== Personnel ==
Public Image Ltd

- John Lydon – lead vocals

with:

- Bill Laswell – bass (1–6), producer
- Steve Vai – guitar
- Nicky Skopelitis – guitar (1–4, 6)
- Ryuichi Sakamoto – Fairlight CMI (2, 3, 5, 7)
- Bernie Worrell – organ (1, 4, 6), Yamaha DX7 (3)
- Ginger Baker – drums (3–5, 7)
- Tony Williams – drums (1, 2, 6)
- Bernard Fowler – backing vocals
- Jonas Hellborg – bass (4)

Additional personnel

- Shankar – electric violin on 2, 4
- Malachi Favors – acoustic bass on 3, 5, 7
- Steve Turre – didgeridoo on 7
- Aïyb Dieng – chatan pot drums on 4

== Charts ==
Chart (1986)	Peak position
Australian Albums (Kent Music Report)	59
Canada Top Albums/CDs (RPM)	95
Dutch Albums (Album Top 100)	35
New Zealand Albums (RMNZ)	34
UK Albums (Official Charts)	14
US Billboard 200	115
