= Prong discography =

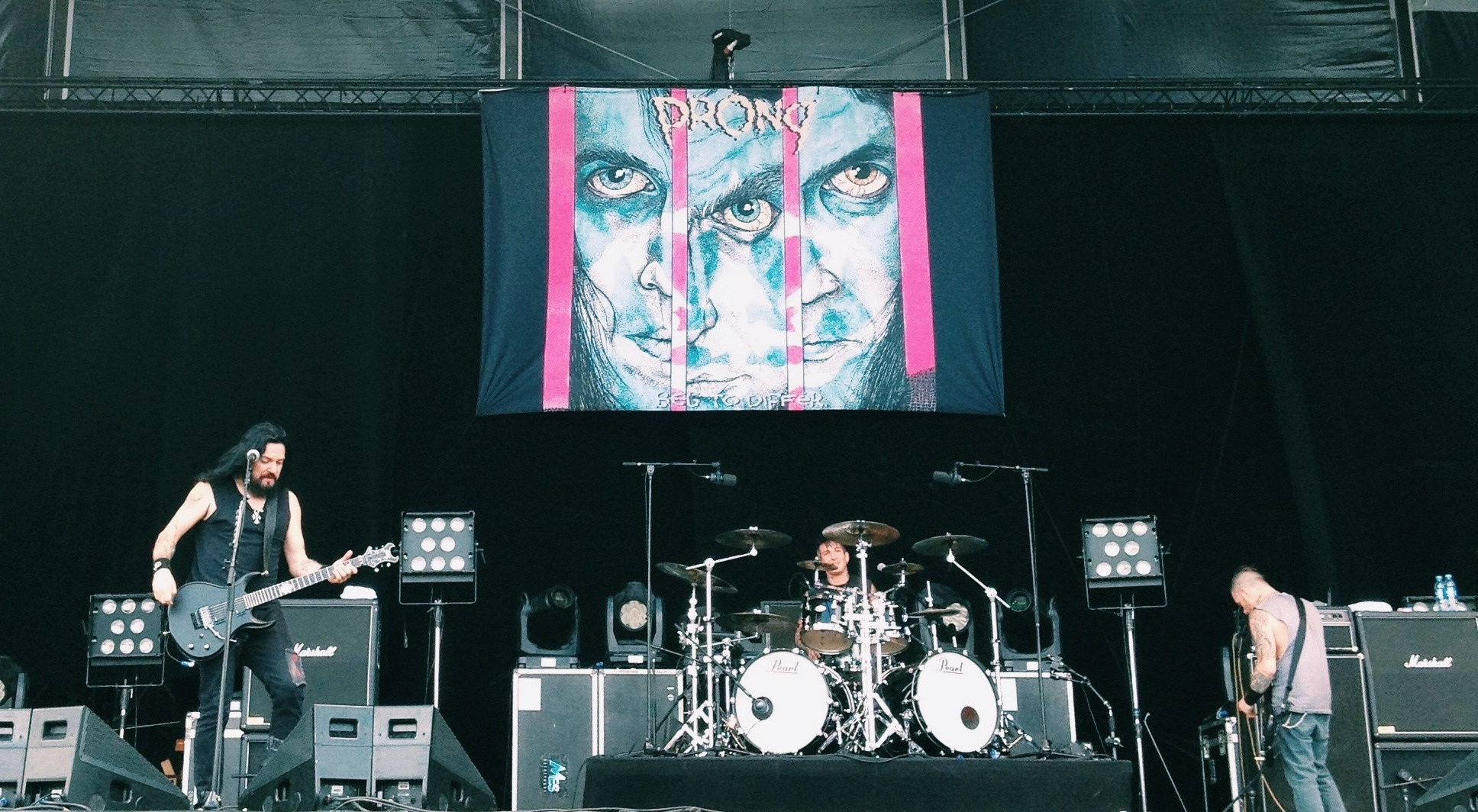
- Prong performing in 2013
- Studio albums: 14
- Extended plays: 4
- Live albums: 2
- Video albums: 1
- Music videos: 13
- Remix albums: 1
- Other appearances: 6

Prong is an American heavy metal band formed in 1986. The band has 14 major releases since 1986, which includes 12 full-length albums, one mini-album, and one cover album. The band was active from 1986 to 1997, and again since 2002. Frontman Tommy Victor has been the only consistent member of the band.

== Studio albums ==
Year	Album details	Peak chart positions						Sales
Year	Album details	US	US Heat.	AUT	GER	SWI	UK	Sales
1988	Force Fed: Released: 1988; Label: Spigot (SPT-2); Format: CD, CS, LP, digital download	—	—	—	—	—	—	
1990	Beg to Differ: Released: March 12, 1990; Label: Epic (EK 46011); Format: CD, CS, LP, DL	—	—	—	—	—	—	
1991	Prove You Wrong: Released: September 24, 1991; Label: Epic (EK 47460); Format: CD, CS, LP, DL	—	34	—	—	—	—	US: 116,721
1994	Cleansing: Released: January 25, 1994; Label: Epic (EK 53019); Format: CD, CS, LP, DL	126	2	38	40	36	71	US: 320,352
1996	Rude Awakening: Released: May 14, 1996; Label: Epic (EK 66945); Format: CD, CS, LP, DL	107	1	36	48	—	131	US: 97,666
2003	Scorpio Rising: Released: November 4, 2003; Label: Locomotive (LM 128); Format: CD, DL	—	—	—	—	—	—	
2007	Power of the Damager: Released: October 2, 2007; Label: 13th Planet (THP 006); Format: CD, DL	—	47	—	—	—	—	
2012	Carved into Stone: Released: April 24, 2012; Label: Long Branch Records (SPV 260102); Format: CD, 2xLP, DL	—	13	—	—	—	—	
2014	Ruining Lives: Released: April 23, 2014; Label: Steamhammer/SPV; Format: CD, digital download, vinyl	—	16	—	77	—	—	
2015	Songs from the Black Hole: Released: March 25, 2015; Label: Steamhammer/SPV; Format: CD, vinyl, DL	—	—	—	—	—	—	
2016	X – No Absolutes: Released: February 5, 2016; Label: Steamhammer/SPV; Format: CD, vinyl, DL	—	7	—	87	—	—	
2017	Zero Days: Released: July 28, 2017; Label: Steamhammer/SPV; Format: CD, LP, DL	—	11	—	86	99	—	
2023	State of Emergency: Released: October 6, 2023; Label: Steamhammer/SPV; Format: CD, LP, DL	—	—	—	—	—	—	
2026	Prong: Released: November 6, 2026; Label: Napalm; Format: CD, LP, DL	—	—	—	—	—	—	
"—" denotes releases that did not chart.

== Live albums ==
Year	Album details
1990	Live at CBGB's: Released: 1990; Label: Epic (ESK 1951), promo; Format: CD, vinyl, cassette
2002	100% Live: Released: October 29, 2002; Label: Locomotive (LM 119); Format: CD
2014	Unleashed in the West: Live in Berlin: Released: March 14, 2014; Format: Digital download, CD
2026	Live And Uncleansed: Release date: March 6, 2026; Label: SPV/Steamhammer; Format: Digital download, CD

== Remix albums ==
Year	Album details
2009	Power of the Damn Mixxxer: Released: May 12, 2009; Label: 13th Planet; Format: CD

== Extended plays ==
Year	EP details	Peak chart positions
Year	EP details	UK
1987	Primitive Origins: Released: August 1987; Label: Spigot (SPT-1); Format: CD, CS, LP	—
1990	The Peel Sessions: Label: Strange Fruit (SFPS 078); Format: CD, CS, LP	—
1992	Whose Fist Is This Anyway?: Label: Epic (658145-2); Format: CD single, 12-inch single	58
1993	Snap Your Fingers, Break Your Back (The Remix EP): Label: Epic (660069-2); Format: CD single, 12-inch single	—
2019	Age of Defiance: Scheduled: November 29, 2019; Label: Steamhammer; Format: Digital download, streaming	—
"—" denotes releases that did not chart.

== Singles ==
Year	Title	Peak chart positions
Year	Title	UK
1989	"Third from the Sun"	—
1990	"Lost and Found"	—
1990	"For Dear Life"	—
1991	"Unconditional"	—
1994	"Snap Your Fingers, Snap Your Neck"	80
1994	"Whose Fist Is This Anyway?"	—
1994	"Broken Peace"	—
1996	"Rude Awakening"	82
1996	"Controller"	—
1996	"Face Value"	—
2015	"Ultimate Authority"	—

== Video albums ==
Year	Video details	Notes
2005	The Vault: Released: March 14, 2005; Label: Locomotive (LM 131); Format: DVD	Double DVD, featuring three different shows, a complete 2002 concert at Amsterdam's Melkweg, another full show from the 2003 Hultsfred Festival in Sweden, and six songs at With Full Force festival in Germany for television broadcast in 2003.

== Music videos ==
Year	Title	Director(s)	Album
1990	"Beg to Differ"	Kevin Kerslake	Beg to Differ
1990	"Lost and Found"	George Seminara	Beg to Differ
1991	"Unconditional"	Josh Taft OR Evan Stone	Prove You Wrong
1991	"Prove You Wrong"	Jim Deloye	Prove You Wrong
1991	"Pointless" (Live)		Prove You Wrong
1992	"Prove You Wrong (Fuzzbuster Mix)"	Jim Deloye	Prove You Wrong
1994	"Broken Peace"	Bill Ward	Cleansing
1994	"Snap Your Fingers, Snap Your Neck"	Bill Ward	Cleansing
1994	"Whose Fist Is This Anyway?"	Bill Ward	Cleansing
1996	"Rude Awakening"	Rob Zombie	Rude Awakening
2004	"All Knowing Force"	Richie S., Dan Laudo & Tommy Victor	Scorpio Rising
2008	"Power of the Damager"	Gary Smithson	Power of the Damager
2012	"Revenge... Best Served Cold"	Scott Hanson	Carved into Stone
2014	"Remove, Separate Self"		Ruining Lives
2018	"Forced into Tolerance"		Zero Days

== Other appearances ==
Year	Title	Album
1992	"Mind the Gap" and "Daily Dose"	The End of Music as We Know It
1994	"Inheritance"	Airheads
1995	"Strange Days" (with Ray Manzarek)	Strange Days
1995	"Corpus Delecti"	Tonnage: A Compilation
1997	"London Dungeon"	Violent World: A Tribute to the Misfits
2004	"Enter Sandman"	Metallic Attack Metallica: The Ultimate Tribute
