= Whose Fist Is This Anyway? =

EP by Prong
- Released: 1992
- Genre: Industrial metal; groove metal
- Length: 26:46
- Label: Epic
- Producer: Mark Dodson, Prong

Prong chronology
Prove You Wrong (1991)	Whose Fist Is This Anyway? (1992)	Cleansing (1994)

Professional ratings
Review scores
Source	Rating
AllMusic	2/5 stars

Whose Fist Is This Anyway? is an EP by American metal band Prong. It consists of five remixes done by various artists, including Paul Raven who later replaced Troy Gregory on bass guitar, and JG Thirlwell of Foetus. The EP features a previously unreleased cover song titled "Talk Talk" (originally by The Music Machine).

== Track listing ==
1. "Prove You Wrong (Fuzzbuster Mix)" – 4:50
2. "Get a Grip (On Yourself) (Harm Mix)" – 3:25
3. "Hell If I Could (Dub Mix)" – 4:56
4. "Irrelevant Thoughts (Safety Mix)" – 2:52
5. "Talk Talk" – 1:59 (The Music Machine cover)
6. "Prove You Wrong (Xanax Mix)" – 8:46

== Personnel ==
- Tommy Victor – vocals, guitar
- Troy Gregory – bass
- Ted Parsons – drums
