= Monte Pittman =

American musician

- Pittman in 2018

Background information
- Also known as: Montster
- Born: Monte Lee Pittman; November 19, 1975 (age 51); Longview, Texas, U.S.
- Genres: Rock, pop, heavy metal, acoustic, alternative rock, blues
- Occupation: Musician
- Instruments: Guitar, bass, vocals
- Years active: 1996–present
- Label: Metal Blade Records
- Member of: Madonna
- Formerly of: Ministry, Prong
- Website: montepittman.com

Monte Lee Pittman (born November 19, 1975) is an American musician and studio musician based in Los Angeles, known largely as Madonna's long-time guitarist and for playing for heavy metal band Prong. He has also worked as a solo artist.

== Biography ==
=== Early life ===
Pittman was born in Longview, Texas. Pittman began playing guitar as a teenager when he received his first guitar at age 13. His guitar teacher was Robert Browning. He also took music theory and piano lessons from Delores Rhoads at the Musonia School of Music in North Hollywood.

Pittman's early musical influences came from bands and artists such as Kiss, Metallica, Slayer, Steve Vai, Judas Priest, Led Zeppelin, Jimmy Page, AC/DC, Black Sabbath, Pantera, The Beach Boys, Pink Floyd, and Radiohead, to name a few.

== Career ==
=== Early career and Myra Mains ===
Pittman's first band was called Insanity. Eventually Pittman formed another project called Myra Mains. He borrowed Chris Sheehan, the singer from his previous Insanity, and merged the band with the drummer Kevin Blalock and bassist TJ. Carlson. The four piece released 2 demo tapes and 2 full album CDs: One Touch 1991, Two Blocks Down From The Seventh Sign (1994), Condition (1996) and Buried (1999). The band was located in Longview, TX, and build a regional following across East Texas to Shreveport.

=== Prong ===
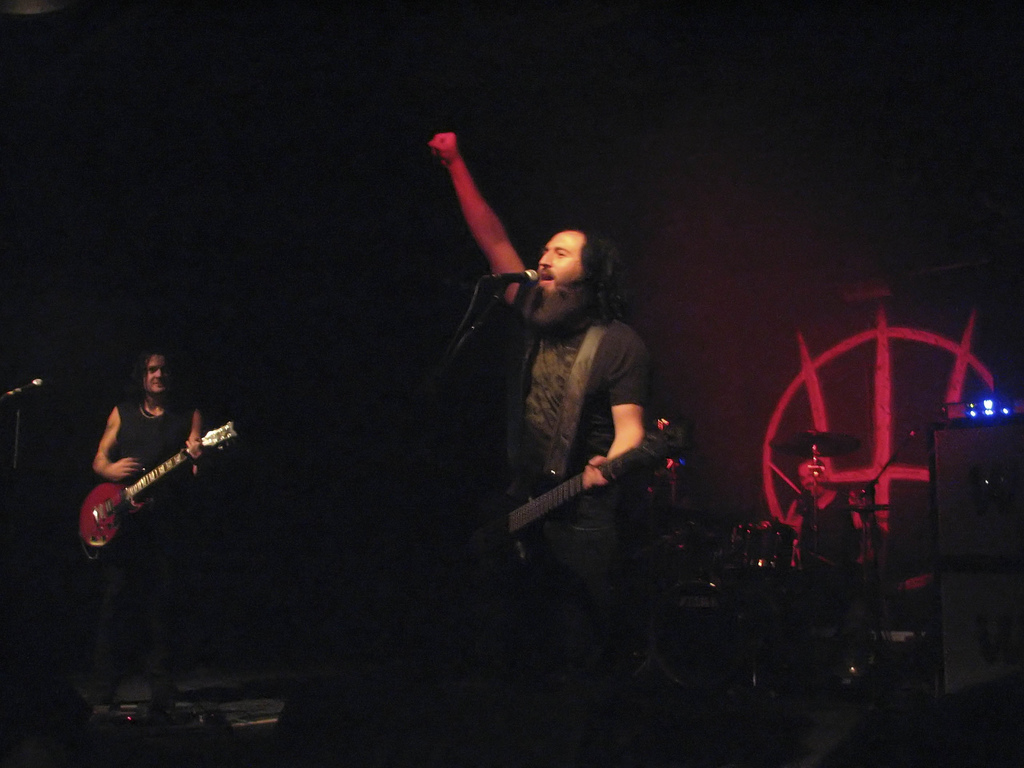
Pittman during Prong's 2007 tour

Pittman was introduced to Tommy Victor by Ivan de Prume from White Zombie. The two had a lot in common and following the introduction Pittman joined the band Prong in 2000. Pittman was invited to play guitar on their 2002 tour that inspired 100% Live album. In 2003, Pittman recorded guitar and bass for Prong's album Scorpio Rising in 2003.

On Power of the Damager, Pittman wrote 5 of the 13 songs, providing background vocals and performing bass. He was credited as an associate producer for both Power of the Damager and its remix version Power of the Damn Mixxxer released in May 2009.

=== Madonna ===
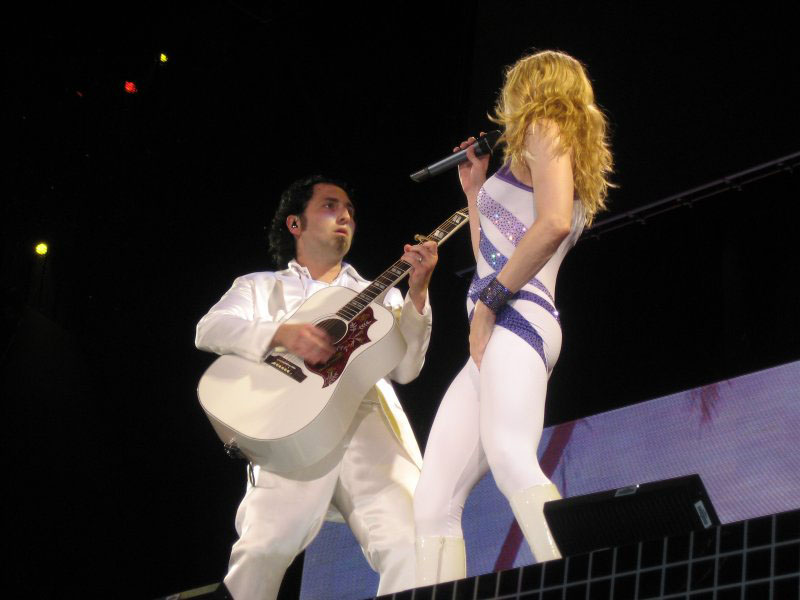
Pittman and Madonna during the Confessions Tour (2006)

Pittman moved to Los Angeles in 1999 and worked at a guitar store as a salesman. He eventually quit to start teaching guitar lessons. Pittman's third student was British film director Guy Ritchie, who had just received a guitar as a gift from his girlfriend, Madonna. Ritchie later returned the favor, buying Madonna her own guitar—and she began to take lessons from Pittman as well.

A month after Pittman started giving guitar lessons to Madonna, he was invited to join her on stage at the Late Show with David Letterman to promote her album Music (2000). The pair played guitar together on an acoustic version of the hit song "Don't Tell Me". Subsequently, Pittman was invited to join the band for Madonna's Drowned World Tour (2001). He has played in every incarnation of Madonna's live band until her Madame X Tour (2019–2020).

Pittman shares writing credits with Madonna on the tracks "Easy Ride" from American Life (2003) and "It's So Cool" from the greatest hits album Celebration (2009). On the Sticky & Sweet Tour (2008–2009), Pittman inadvertently prompted Madonna to include the opening riff from Pantera's "A New Level" in the live version of "Hung Up" when he suggested the riff as guitar practice.

Additionally, Pittman has contributed performances to Madonna's studio recordings, appearing on "Like ot or Not" from Confessions on a Dance Floor (2005) and "Spanish Lesson" and "Ring my Bell" from Hard Candy (2008).

Apart from world tours Pittman has joined Madonna on stage in many special events, most notably at Live 8 where he played for thousands of people at Hyde Park in 2005 and at the 2007 Live Earth where he had the chance to jam "Big Bottom" with Spinal Tap, James Hetfield and Kirk Hammett among a dozen of other bass players on stage.

In 2012, Pittman played at the Super Bowl XLVI halftime show alongside to Madonna, where he debuted his new signature Jarrell MPS Guitar. The whole band performed "Vogue," "Give Me All Your Love", and "Like a Prayer."

Pittman started his fifth world tour with Madonna, the MDNA Tour (2012), in Tel Aviv, Israel, with stops in Europe, North & South America till the end of 2012. Paul Oakenfold who opened for Madonna in several US shows, invited Pittman on stage to jam together in the last North American shows of the tour.

Between September 2015 and March 2016, Pittman toured with Madonna on her Rebel Heart Tour.

=== Ministry ===
Monte Pittman joined Ministry in 2021 although previously joined the band in 2014 and 2015. Upon returning, Pittman was prominently featured as the guitarist in the music videos for "Disinformation" and "Believe Me" from the album Moral Hygiene.

Since rejoining Ministry, Pittman has participated in all major tours: The Industrial Strength Tour alongside Melvins and Corrosion of Conformity, Freaks on Parade Tour including Rob Zombie, and Alice Cooper Hopiumforthemasses Tour with Gary Numan and Front Line Assembly, and The Squirrely Years Tour.

In addition to touring, Pittman contributed creatively to the band, co-writing songs and performing both guitar and bass on the albums Hopiumforthemasses and The Squirrely Years. Pittman was featured as the guitarist for the Ministry Music Videos for "BDE" "Goddam White Trash," "Just Stop Oil" "New Religion, and "I'd Do Anything For You"

As of October 5, 2026, Pittman has quit Ministry again and was replaced by Patrick Houston.

=== Other work ===
Prior to Adam Lambert's audition on American Idol, Pittman formed the band The Citizen Vein with Lambert, Tommy Victor from Prong and Steve Sidelnyk. He later served as a guitarist and musical director for Lambert's early touring band. The project appeared on several television programs and performed at Gridlock New Year's Eve 2010 festival. Pittman co-write Lamberts independently released album Beg for Mercy. Rock Star Weekly wrote "Pittman has a rock-god presence of his own, arising from his well-honed, skilled riffs that come from a connection of love and devotion to his instrument over a long and distinguished musical career"

Pittman also worked in the studio with Melanie C and helped finish the album Reason that was released on Virgin Records in 2003. Another collaboration included Pittman playing guitar on Sophie Ellis-Bextor’s 2003 album Shoot from the Hip.

==== Body Count ====
Monte Pittman contributed to Body Count: Ernie C and Juan Garcias's Project. Pittman co-wrote the song "Blood Lust" was released on the Century Media Records.

LA KISS House band

In 2016, Monte Pittman performed as part of the LA KISS Football house band, alongside Patrick Stone and Matt Starr, delivering multiple live sets before, during, and after home games at the Honda Center in Anaheim, California.

== Solo career ==
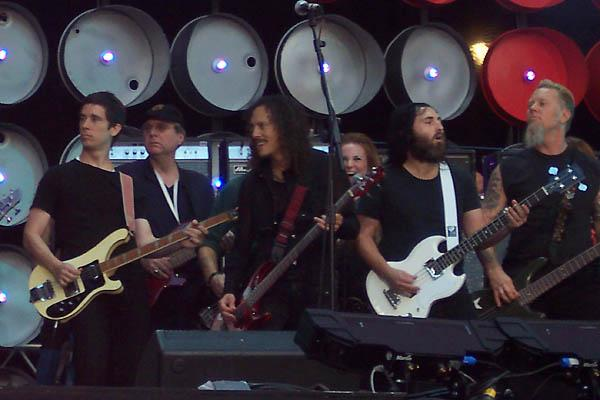
Pittman between Stuart Price, Kirk Hammett and James Hetfield at Live Earth

Pittman has been known to perform solo acoustic shows in between his responsibilities with Prong and Madonna. He developed a versatile musicianship capable of perming in large scale pop stadiums to intimate club settings for heavy metal music. Pittman's solo work diverges from these styles and is focused on melodic acoustic material which later expanded into traditional rock compositions.

=== The Deepest Dark ===
His debut solo album, The Deepest Dark, was released in November 2009 and features eleven songs primarily written by Pittman. The track "The Circle" was co-written with Tommy Victor and Adam Lambert. All the songs are acoustic.

Almost a year after its digital release, The Deepest Dark was re-released in hard copy with five additional bonus tracks. A week later, the album reached the No. 1 on acoustic albums charts on CD Baby and ranked No. 9 among the plaftform's top-selling albums for October 2010.

=== Pain, Love & Destiny ===
Pittman raised $65,500 through Kickstarter, a crowdfunding platform to fund his second solo album Pain, Love & Destiny. He recorded the album in the summer of 2011 and the album was produced by Noah Shain. The album features Kane Ritchotte on drums and Kelle Rhoads, Randy Rhoads' brother, on piano. The album was released on October 3, 2011

Upon its release, the album reached No. 1 on Rock and Pop charts and debuated within the top ten overall albums. The album was also available at the Official Merchandise Booths of Madonna's 2012 MDNA Tour.

Pittman was nominated for four categories at Artists in Music Awards and was invited to perform at the ceremony on February 10, 2012, when he won the "Best Solo Artist" award. Additionally, Pittman received a Career Achievement Award – Guitarist for the Hollywood F.A.M.E. Awards.

On June 29, 2012, Pittman was invited to ZDF's Morgenmagazin morning TV show where he performed an acoustic version of the song "Lost" from his album Pain, Love & Destiny.

=== The Power of Three ===
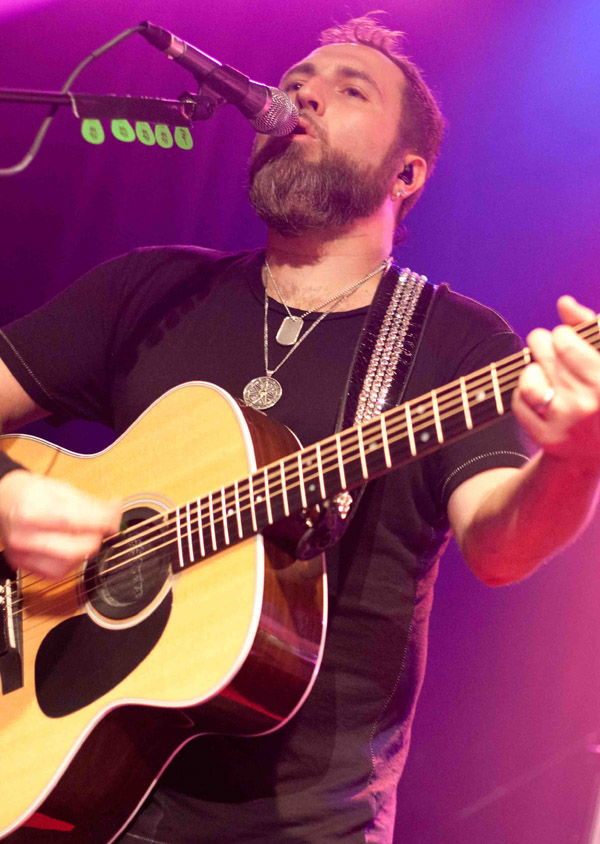
Pittman in 2011

Pittman started working on new material on July 1, 2012, in Copenhagen, with Danish producer Flemming Rasmussen, known for producing early Metallica albums. He first released an acoustic EP "M.P.3.: The Power of Three, Part 1" on November 19, 2012, and returned to Copenhagen in February 2013, with bandmates Kane Ritchotte and Max Whipple to record more songs with Rasmussen producing.

After playing the album to Metal Blade's CEO Brian Slagel, he got signed to the label to release The Power of Three in 2014.

The first single "A Dark Horse", was released on October 14, 2013, and marked a return to Pittman's metal style. The second single "Before the Mourning Son" was released on November 25, 2013. The album's final track, "All is Fair in Love and WAr," features guest guitarist Alex Skolnick from Testament' and vocals from Chris Barnes from Cannibal Corpse and Six Feet Under.

The Power of Three was released on January 21, 2014, with positive reviews noting its significance within the hard rock and metal genres. Music blog "The Global Onslaught" has described the album as "2014's sleeping giant in the echelons of Hard Rock and Metal".

=== Inverted Grasp of Balance ===
On 2016's Inverted Grasp of Balance, Pittman joined drummer Richard Christy and bassist Billy Sheehan.

=== Between the Space ===
Pittman released Between the Space on Metal Blade in August 2018 and undertook a tour with Sebastian Bach of Skid Row in the USA.

=== Better or Worse ===
At the same time Pittman released Between the Space, he released an acoustic album Better or Worse also on Metal Blade.

=== Soundtrack ===
Pittman has contributed to film and television as both a performer and songwriter. He is credited for his work on the song “Truce,” featured in the crime drama Edison, on which he performed guitar live. Pittman has also been credited as a writer on “Can’t Stop the Bleeding” for Wicked Lake and as a performer on “Venus” for Shooting Gallery. His soundtrack work reflects his broader career as a session and recording musician contributing to film and television projects.

Pittman performed “Don’t Tell Me” on the television series Late Show with David Letterman. In addition to this credit, he has contributed music to various film and television-related projects through his work as a performer and recording musician.

Rock n Roll Fantasy Camp

Monte Pittman has also served as an instructor at Rock 'n' Roll Fantasy Camp, where he shares his experience and mentors aspiring musicians through hands-on workshops and live performance training, assisting the attendees to perform for artists such as Stewart Copeland, Jeff Skunk Baxter, Tommy Lee, Buddy Guy, Chris Layton, Rob Halford and many more.

Pittman got inducted into 2026 Rock n Roll Fantasy Hall of Fame alongside to Sebastian Bach, Tony Franklin, and Stephen Perkins which took place at the Whiskey A Go-Go.

== Acting ==
Pittman has appeared in a number of film, television, and music videos. His film roles include appearances in Megalodon: The Frenzy (2023), in which he portrayed a “Banana Boat Victim,” and Predator: Wastelands (2025), where he played Amir the Sniper. Additionally, Pitman appeared in Garden of Eden (2025) and had a role in Airplane 2025 (2025).

In addition to film, Pittman has appeared in several music videos, particularly in connection with the industrial metal band Ministry. These include “Disinformation” (2021), “Believe Me” (2022), “B.D.E.” (2024), and “New Religion” (2024).

Lastly, Pittman appeared in concert films and television specials, including Madonna: Live from Roseland Ballroom (2008), where he is featured as a guitarist.

== Equipment ==
=== Guitars ===
Pittman uses the Gibson Les Paul as his primary guitar. He has also been known to play Gibson SG's and owns several custom-made Gibson electrics, acoustic guitars, and bass guitars. Some of these special guitars were built for Madonna's shows. In 2015 he signed an endorsement deal with ESP guitars. Pittman plays the Eclipse FRX, the Strat, the Tele, and Flying V by ESP.

==== Jarrell MPS Signature Guitar ====
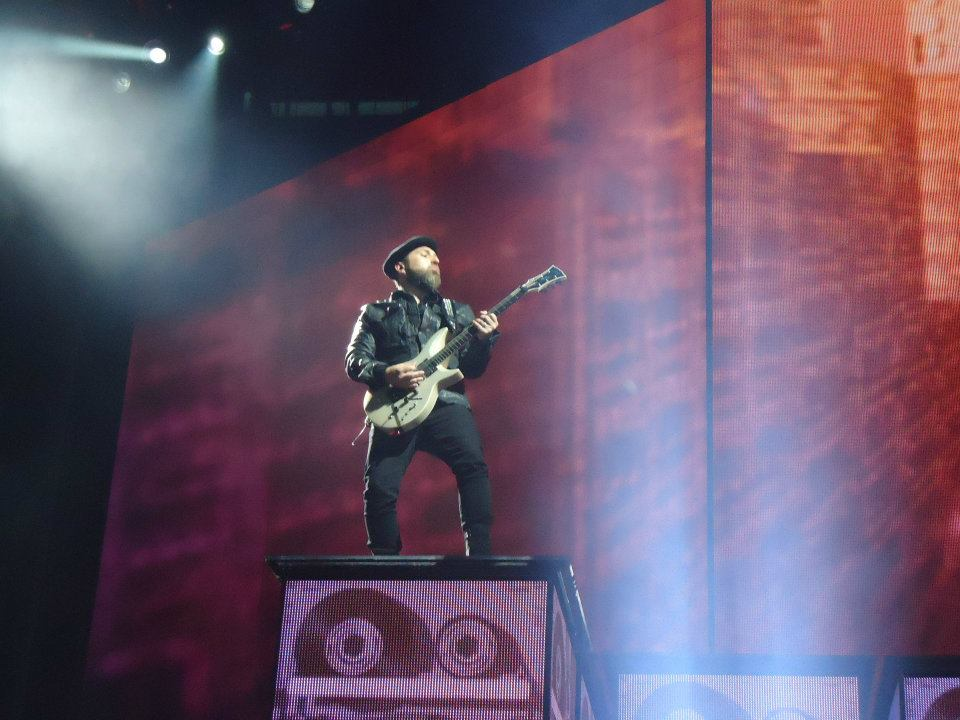
Pittman playing the Jarrell MPS during the MDNA Tour

In December 2011, Jarrell Guitars announced the Monte Pittman Guitar, presented at NAMM 2012. The Jarrell MPS features a custom Seymour Duncan pickups and three models' the standard MPS, the MPS-f with a Floyd rose remolo, and the MPS Classic. Pittman calls the MPS and highly versatile, offering multiple tonal options for playing live.

Pittman comments on the MPS, "There are 13 different sounds you can get out of it. It's the most versatile guitar I've ever played. Jarrell guitars have a unique and distinctive sound. We have three models. The regular MPS and the MPS-f which has a Floyd Rose. They are loaded with custom Seymour Duncan pickups. There is also the MPS Classic which is the least expensive."

=== Amplifiers ===
Pittman is endorsed by Orange Amplifiers. Monte Pittman also uses Kemper Profiler for his live setup; paired with a Captor X IR from Two Notes Audio Engineering's Ministry DynIR Hot Rod Cabinet collection, routed through Emperor Cabinets for front-of-house sound.

=== Effects ===
Like most guitarists, Pittman's effects change from show to show, but he has consistently employed the Roger Linn Adrena Linn, the Emma DiscomBOBulator, and the Keeley Compressor. He has been known to use Eventide, Boss, MXR, Crybaby, Ernie Ball, Electro-Harmonix, Digitech, Line 6, Dunlop, VoiceLive 2 by TC-Helicon and Fishman effects pedals.

=== Pickups ===
Pittman uses 78 and a Greenie Seymour Duncan Pickups in his guitars.

== Discography ==
=== Solo albums ===
- Between the Space (2018)
- Better or Worse (2018)
- Inverted Grasp of Balance (2016)
- The Power of Three (2014)
- Before The Mourning Son – single (2013)
- A Dark Horse – single (2013)
- M.P.3: The Power of Three, Part 1 (2012)
- Pain, Love, & Destiny (2011)
- The Deepest Dark (with bonus tracks) (2010)
- The Deepest Dark (2009)

=== With Madonna ===
- Drowned World Tour (2001)
- American Life (2003)
- Re-Invention Tour (2004)
- Confessions on a Dance Floor (2005)
- I'm Going to Tell You a Secret (2006)
- Confessions Tour (2007)
- Hey You (single) (2007)
- Hard Candy (2008)
- It's So Cool (2009) (Celebration bonus track)
- Sticky & Sweet Tour (2010)
- MDNA Tour (2012)
- Rebel Heart Tour (2015–2016)

=== With Ministry ===
- Hopiumforthemasses (2024)
- The Squirrely Years Revisted (2025)

=== With Prong ===
- 100% Live (2002)
- Scorpio Rising (2003)
- The Vault (2005)
- Power of the Damager (2007)
- Power of the Damn Mixxxer (2009)

=== With Myra Mains ===
- One Touch (1991)
- Condition (1996)
- Buried (1999)
- Two Blocks Down from the Seventh Sign (cassette EP) (1994)
- MYRA MAINS (Eden's Way, Rape the Whirlwind, Truth, Death Is But a Bag of Chips) (self-titled cassette EP) (1992)

=== With other artists ===
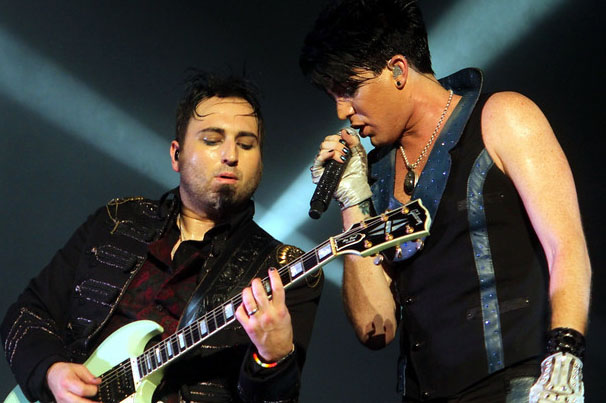
Pittman (left) with Adam Lambert

- Melanie C – Reason (2003)
- Sophie Ellis-Bextor – Shoot from the Hip (2003)
- Adam Lambert – Take One (2005)
- Run Run Run – Endless Winter (2006)
- Run Run Run – Good Company EP (2007)
- Jes – Disconnect (2007)
- Nicki Richards – Nicki (2008)
- In Extremo – Sängerkrieg (2008)
- Adam Lambert – Adam Lambert Acoustic Live (2010)
- Adam Lambert – Glam Nation Live (2011)
- Adam Lambert – Beg for Mercy (2011)
- Body Count – Bloodlust (2017)

== Tours and special events ==
- Drowned World Tour (2001) with Madonna
- Prong Live (2002–2003) with Prong
- MTV Video Music Awards (2003) with Madonna
- Re-Invention World Tour (2004) with Madonna
- Tsunami Aid (2004) with Madonna
- Live 8 (2005) with Madonna
- MTV Europe Music Awards (2005) with Madonna
- Grammy Awards (2006) with Madonna
- Confessions Tour (2006) with Madonna
- Live Earth (2007) with Madonna
- Slicing Across America & Europe (2007) with Prong
- Sticky & Sweet Tour (2008–2009) with Madonna
- American Music Awards (2009) with Adam Lambert
- Hope for Haiti Now (2010) with Madonna
- GLAAD Media Award (2010) with Adam Lambert
- Glam Nation Tour (2010) with Adam Lambert
- Artists in Music Awards (2011) solo
- MDNA Tour (2012) with Madonna
- From Beer to Eternity Tour with Ministry
- Rebel Heart Tour (2015–2016) with Madonna
- Monte Pittman Solo Tour (2018) with Sebastian Bach
- Monte Pittman Solo Tour (2019) with Tony MacAlpine
- Madame X Tour (2019–2020) with Madonna
- The Industrial Strength Tour (2022) with Ministry and bands Helmet, Front Line Assembly, Melvins, and Corrosion of Conformity.
- Moral Hygiene European Tour (2022) with Ministry, the 69 Eyes, and 3Teeth
- Freaks on Parade Tour (2024) with Ministry, Rob Zombie, Alice Cooper and Filter
- The Hopfiumforthemasses Tour (2024) with Ministry, Gary Numan, and Front Line Assembly
- The Squirrly Years (2025) with Ministry, Nitzer Ebb, My Life With The Thrill Kill Kult, and Die Krupps Incoming

== Awards ==
=== Artists in Music Awards ===
Year	Nominee / work	Award	Result
2012	Monte Pittman	Best Rock Artist	Nominated
2012	Monte Pittman	Best Blues Artist	Nominated
2012	Monte Pittman	Best Solo Artist	Won
2012	Pain, Love & Destiny	Album of the Year	Nominated

=== Los Angeles Music Awards ===
Year	Nominee / work	Award	Result
2012	Monte Pittman	Male Singer/Songwriter	Nominated

=== Hollywood F.A.M.E. Awards ===
Pittman was honored by the Hollywood F.A.M.E. Awards with the "Career Achievement Award – Guitarist" on November 15, 2012
