= Prove You Wrong =

Studio album by Prong
- Released: September 24, 1991
- Recorded: 1990–1991
- Genres: Groove metal; alternative metal
- Length: 45:07
- Label: Epic
- Producer: Mark Dodson

Prong chronology
| Beg to Differ (1990) | Prove You Wrong (1991) | Whose Fist Is This Anyway? (1992) |

Prove You Wrong is the third studio album by American heavy metal band Prong, released in 1991. It is their only album with Troy Gregory on bass guitar. The album includes a cover of "(Get A) Grip (On Yourself)", originally by the Stranglers.

Prove You Wrong continued the experimentation with groove metal that began on Prong's previous album Beg to Differ, toning down much of the hardcore punk elements from their 1980s output in favor of a more experimental sound that was influenced by alternative, thrash metal, funk, progressive, and industrial music. Lead singer Tommy Victor said it had taken him a year to write the lyrics, which contained an accumulation of 16 years of experiences and anxieties, "looking through a rat's eyes at the whole New York experience."

== Critical reception ==
Professional ratings
Review scores
| Source | Rating |
|---|---|
| AllMusic | 4/5 stars |
| Collector's Guide to Heavy Metal | 7/10 |
| The Encyclopedia of Popular Music | 3/5 stars |
| Entertainment Weekly | A− |
| MusicHound Rock | 3/5 stars |
| The Rolling Stone Album Guide | 3.5/5 stars |

Entertainment Weekly wrote that Prong "combines postindustrial noise, a rebellious punk mentality, and heavy-metal flourishes and, with a minimalist approach that is anything but simplistic, strips them all down to a brutal essence." Trouser Press wrote: "While the trio’s devotion to precisely lurching rhythms keeps the songs choppy—a clenched fist twitching spasmodically as it prepares to deliver a haymaker—this dull record makes that attribute part of a tentative shift toward industrial anti-musicality."

Chuck Eddy of The Village Voice grouped Prong alongside Die Kreuzen and Corrosion of Conformity as groups departing from "ordinary heavy metal", saying they "want to be jazz bands or something", as evident in their use of texture, amorphous lyrics, instrument-like vocal usage, atypical song structures and abstract cover art, noting the "Neptune's trident penetrating a multitentacled sort of jellyfish thing" on the Prove Your Wrong sleeve. He considered Prong the liveliest and jazziest of the three bands and felt that, by aiming for "1980-vintage gloompunk hyperactivity and compulsiveness on Prove Your Wrong, their sproinging twang spirals almost airily out of shifting peatbogs of drum-muck, and 'Positively Blind' is the most molten and mournful Sir Lord Baltimore tribute ever. What makes it 'jazz,' I think, is its coldhearted emphasis on the manly crafts of musicianship and composition, to the detriment of anything compelling", noting that the band only allow themselves "one pop hook", on their "Eno-trance-loop" cover of the Stranglers' "(Get A) Grip (On Yourself)", and lamented that the band "seem afraid to get their hands dirty."

Retrospectively, Cosmo Lee of Stylus Magazine cites Prove You Wrong as the transition between the trash metal of Beg to Differ (1990) and the industrial metal of Cleansing (1994), two better-known albums. In particular he notes how several industrial samples lace the album, predicting the loops of the more dancefloor-oriented Cleansing. As well as noting the album's compact, groovy sound and strange, dissonant guitars, Lee praises the salient production, noting that it is ambiguously not mixed like other metal albums: "The drums sound hollow and reverbed-out, capturing the tribal dub feel typical of Killing Joke and other '80s acts, [whereas Troy Gregory's bass] is high in the mix compared to the guitars, which are curiously un-heavy. They're almost twangy, with very '80s chorus and reverb. If Joy Division went metal, it might sound like this."

== Track listing ==
1. "Irrelevant Thoughts" – 2:37 (Tommy Victor, Ted Parsons)
2. "Unconditional" – 4:45 (Victor, Troy Gregory)
3. "Positively Blind" – 2:43 (Victor)
4. "Prove You Wrong" – 3:31 (Victor, Gregory)
5. "Hell If I Could" – 4:00 (Victor, Gregory)
6. "Pointless" – 3:07 (Victor, Gregory, Parsons)
7. "Contradictions" – 4:10 (Victor)
8. "Torn Between" – 3:11 (Victor, Gregory)
9. "Brainwave" – 3:01 (Victor)
10. "Territorial Rites" – 3:31 (Victor, Gregory, Parsons)
11. "(Get A) Grip (On Yourself)" – 3:05 (Hugh Cornwell) (The Stranglers cover)
12. "Shouldn't Have Bothered" – 2:39 (Victor)
13. "No Way to Deny It" – 4:41 (Victor)

== Personnel ==
Prong

- Tommy Victor – lead vocals, lead and rhythm guitars
- Troy Gregory – bass guitar, backing vocals
- Ted Parsons – drums, percussion, backing vocals

Production

- Prong – arrangers
- Mark Dodson – arranger, producer, engineer, mixing, additional vocals
- Brooke Hendricks – engineer, assistant engineer
- Brian Stover – assistant engineer
- Greg Calbi – mastering
- Roger Lomas – mastering
