= The Peel Sessions (Prong EP) =

EP by Prong
- Released: 1990
- Recorded: 22 January 1989
- Genre: Crossover thrash
- Label: Strange Fruit

The Peel Sessions is the second EP by American heavy metal band Prong. It was released in 1990.

Recorded in 1989 and released by Strange Fruit Records, the EP features four tracks: One new song, one from Primitive Origins and two from Force Fed, but produced with a "cleaner" sound.

== Track listing ==
1. "Defiant"
2. "Decay"
3. "Senseless Abuse"
4. "In My Veins"

The session was broadcast on 1 February 1989, on "The John Peel Show" on BBC Radio 1.
