= Neon Hearts =

British punk rock band

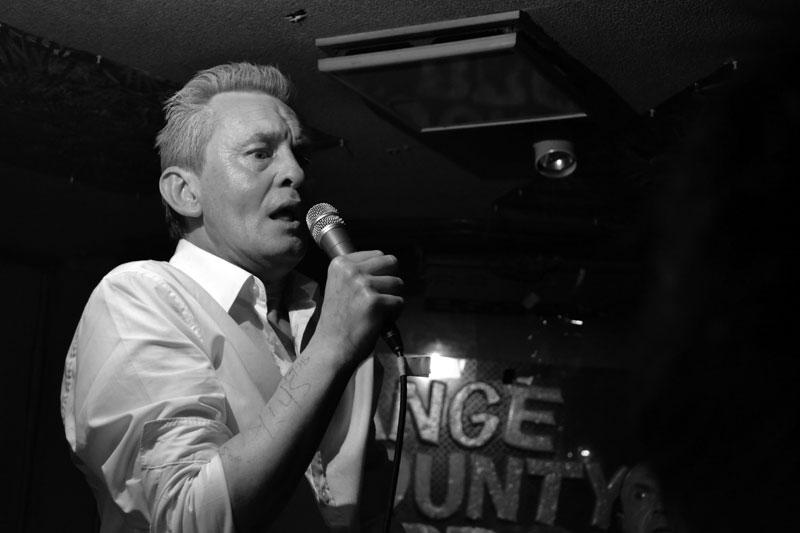
- Neon Hearts in Yokohama, Japan, 2014

Background information
- Origin: Wolverhampton, England
- Genres: Punk
- Years active: 1977–1981, 2013–present
- Labels: Satril Records; Neon Hearts Records; Overground Records
- Members: Tone Dial; Steve Heart; Paul Raven; Martin Ratcliffe; Keith Allen; Ed Bol

Neon Hearts are an English punk rock band that originated in Wolverhampton, England.

== Career ==
Neon Hearts were Wolverhampton's first punk band that had a short lived existence from 1977 to 1981 at the height of the punk movement.

The band was founded in the summer of 1977 by Steve Heart when he quit Birmingham-based Suburban Studs after being told a sax player was inappropriate in a punk band. The initial line up included Steve, his cousin, a bass player called Paul Raven, a drummer friend of Paul's, Keith Allen, and Martin Ratcliffe, a guitarist friend of Keith's.

After a few weeks rehearsing, the band went into Lee Sound Studios to arrange a demo recording session.

They soon came across a solo singer playing local pubs and clubs doing his own songs and a few Bowie covers. Tony Deary (later Tone Dial) joined the band after a couple of meetings and the band (now five members) was complete. After much debate the band decided to call themselves Neon Hearts.

After the first sessions at Ginger Studios two songs, 'Regulations' and 'Venus Eccentric' were chosen to become a double A-sided single released on 1 December 1977 on the band's own label, Neon Hearts Records. The first pressing of the single was released in an oversized 8" sleeve due to a printing error.

Throughout this period record company interest increased, but was narrowed down to two main candidatesThe band signed to Satril, a satellite company of WEA, in May 1978. From day one problems occurred Satril attempting to get the band to move into a more 'funky' direction and submit material to the Eurovision song contest. Being optimistic, Neon Hearts felt things would improve however, things worsened and they ended up trying to make the best of a bad job.

The first demos for Satril were recorded at PYE Studios in London on 6 June 1978 under the supervision of A&R manager Paul Jenkins. The band wanted to release 'Popular Music' as their Satril debut, but they were overruled by the label that chose 'Answers', which was released late July 1978. The single was given no promotion by Satril so the band self-promoted it by gigging. Satril agreed to release 'Popular Music' as the second single.

In preparation for promoting the album the band appeared on Look! Hear!, a TV music show that was screened on BBC Midlands, in January 1980. They performed the new single "Popular Music" and "Synchronisation", a song that was never recorded elsewhere.

== Neon Hearts Mk II ==
The band recorded a John Peel Session on 21 March at the Maida Vale Studios in London. The tracks were "Roll-On Deodorant", "Rings of Confidence", a re-working of "Body Language" and "The Other Great Sex Pros (Airborne Hormones)".

== Neon Hearts Mk III and Silhouette Theatre ==
In late 1980 Steve and Tony decided to reform Neon Hearts. The same year, Tony released an EP, You Keep Coming Round, with a new band, Silhouette Theatre. The material was strong but inadequate distribution and airplay meant it achieved little commercial success. Dial subsequently joined Birmingham group Fashion for a period.

== Final Chapter ==
By chance the five band members met up in August 2002 and ended up recording two new songs written by Tony, "Retrograde" and "Heart of Darkness". This was the last time the band played together due to the tragic death of bass player Paul Raven in October 2007. Paul had become a highly influential musician best known for his work in the seminal punk/goth/metal/electronic group Killing Joke. He later played in the alternative rock/industrial rock bands Prong & Ministry. Tony Dial later changed his name to Vael Deary and is now writing songs towards entertaining an audience. Vael won't do the retro thing with the Neon Hearts. He's busy playing to unsuspecting audiences across the UK.

== Re-releases ==
A compilation CD called Ball & Chain was released by Overground records in 1997. This included alternate versions of songs on the Popular Music album, the John Peel session and a number of other previously unreleased recordings. Based on the success of this CD Overground re-released The Popular Music album in CD format in 2002.

== Neon Japan ==
In November 2011 a nine-track Neon Hearts Tribute CD was released in Japan on the Simply Thrilling label. The project was the brainchild of record producer and promoter Miles Wood, who is based in the Far East and picked up on the band's popularity in Japan. In an interview with Junk Archive Miles recalled, "The idea came to me after Nervous Hearts (a side project of The Fadeaways) played a cover of "Answers" at a show I organised in Yokohama. I knew there were some Neon Hearts fans in Japan and among those were a few musicians in bands that I worked with. So I mentioned the idea to Nervous Hearts’ vocalist if they would be interested in recording "Answers" for a Neon Hearts tribute EP or album; he said yes, and thought it was a good idea so I started asking other bands. My first question was always "Do you know and like Neon Hearts?" and I got some excited responses. Sometimes I would mention the idea to someone in passing and was surprised to hear them say "I love Neon Hearts!" and so I would immediately invite them on board."

Miles continues how he then decided to get the original band to endorse and support the idea. "Luckily with the world as it is today I was able to do so from the opposite side of the globe. I told them of my idea, and asked if they would also like to come on board and mix and master the album. They gave me the green light and also accepted the offer. There was some discussion of a possible Neon Hearts Japanese Tour to coincide, but ultimately it has come down to Keith and Martin travelling to Japan for the album release gigs and playing with the bands on their respective cover versions and a few Neon Hearts classics as well. I’m not unhappy with this as I didn’t want them to be seen as some kind of "cabaret act" as some of the reformed 70's punk bands are in danger of being. To me, it's important that while there's an obvious element of nostalgia involved, it remains very much contemporary."

The cover is an 8-inch cardboard sleeve in homage to the unique-size "Regulations" one. The front design is, of course, adapted from that, while the back design reference one commonly found on the back of ‘sukejan’ – Japanese souvenir jackets initially popular with US military personnel in the 1950s. The tracks include Baby Blue – Popular Music, The C & C – Teenage Units, Eddie Legend Story – Regulations, Kannana Speedcats – Armchair Thriller, Keen Monkey Work – Pin Cushions, Kill Times – Wasted, The Telepathys – Answers, You Got A Radio – Venus Eccentric, Young Parisian – Body Language.

== Dangerous Planet ==
Inspired by this renewed activity, Neon Hearts reformed as a four piece including original members Tone Dial (Vocals), Keith Allen (Drums) and Martin Ratcliffe (Guitar) joined by Ed Bol (Bass). Steve Heart (Sax) decided not to get involved at this stage due to work commitments. The band released a four track EP in March 2014 including Dangerous Planet, Sleep with your Enemy, Retrograde and Synchronisation. More songs were recorded at the time but have not been released.

== Japan Tour ==
Following up on the interest in Japan, Neon Hearts played run of gigs in April 2014. The tour included gigs at Orange County Bros - Yokohama, Sougen - Shizuoka, Shinjuku Jam - Tokyo, Pepperland - Okayama, Mele - Osak, Bees Knees - Kobe and Penguin House - Koenji. The band continued playing gigs in the UK for the rest of 2014 before deciding to disband again.

== Discography ==
Singles

- "Regulations"/"Venus Eccentric" (1977) Neon Hearts Records
- "Answers" (1978) Satril
- "Popular Music" (1978) Satril

Albums

- Popular Music (1979) Satril
- Popular Music (2002) Overground Records reissue

Compilations

- Ball & Chain (1997) Overground Records
- Neon Japan Tribute CD (2011) Simply Thrilling

EP's

- Dangerous Planet (2014) Neon Hearts
