= Primitive Origins =

Studio album (mini album) by Prong
- Released: August 1987
- Recorded: 1987
- Genre: Crossover thrash
- Length: 18:12
- Label: Mr. Bear

Prong chronology
Primitive Origins (1987)	Force Fed (1988)

Professional ratings
Review scores
Source	Rating
AllMusic	2/5 stars
New Musical Express	9/10

Primitive Origins is the debut mini-album by American heavy metal band Prong. All of the songs remained exclusive to this release, with the exception of "In My Veins", which was later re-recorded during a session with John Peel (BBC) and released on The Peel Sessions. All songs were written by Tommy Victor and Michael Kirkland.

Primitive Origins was initially released on the short-lived Mr. Bear Records label. It was eventually reissued by the British label Southern Records.

== Track listing ==
1. "Disbelief" – 1:42 (Victor)
2. "Watching" – 1:52 (Kirkland)
3. "Cling to Life" – 1:39 (Victor, Kirkland)
4. "Denial" – 1:42 (Victor)
5. "Dreams Like That" – 2:19 (Kirkland)
6. "In My Veins" – 2:09 (Kirkland)
7. "Climate Control" – 3:13 (Victor)
8. "Persecution" – 4:56 (Victor, Kirkland)

== Personnel ==
- Tommy Victor – lead vocals, guitar
- Ted Parsons – drums, backing vocals
- Mike Kirkland – bass, backing vocals
