= Prong =

Prong or Prongs may refer to:

- Prong, synonym of tine (structural), a branch or spike of various tools and natural objects
- Prong (band), an American metal band
- Prong (company), an iPhone accessories company in New York City
- Prongs, British designation of the World War II Rhino tank
- "Prongs", nickname of James Potter (character), father of the fictional character Harry Potter

== See also ==
- Pronghorn, an ungulate mammal native to North America
- Pronging, the gait of quadrupeds involving jumping high into the air (Stotting)
- Prong's Lighthouse, Mumbai, India
