= Aaron Rossi =

American drummer (1980–2025)

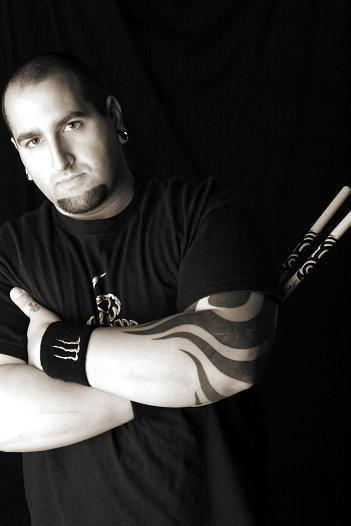

Background information
- Also known as: Shredder
- Born: Aaron John Rossi; December 6, 1980; South Kingstown, Rhode Island, U.S.
- Died: January 27, 2025 (aged 44)
- Genres: Heavy metal; industrial metal; punk rock; thrash metal; death metal; groove metal; metalcore
- Occupation: Drummer
- Years active: 2000–2025
- Formerly of: Ministry, Prong, Strife, Shelter

Aaron John Rossi (December 6, 1980 – January 27, 2025) was an American drummer, most notable for his performance with industrial metal band Ministry and heavy metal band Prong. He was nominated for a Grammy at the 52nd Grammy Awards in 2010. Rossi died from a heart attack on January 27, 2025, at the age of 44.

== Discography ==
John 5

- Songs for Sanity (2005)

Ankla

- Steep Trails (2006)

Prong

- Power of the Damager (2007)
- Power of the Damn Mixxxer (2009)

Ministry

- Adios... Puta Madres (live album, 2009)
- From Beer to Eternity (2013)
