= Prong (album) =

Studio album by Prong
- Released: November 6, 2026
- Length: 45:04
- Label: Napalm
- Producer: Tommy Victor

Prong chronology
Live and Uncleansed (2026)	Prong (2026)

Prong is the fourteenth studio album by American heavy metal band Prong. The album was released on November 6, 2026, through Napalm Records. Prong was produced by the band's guitarist/vocalist Tommy Victor. It is also the first studio album to feature Christopher Dean on bass and Tyler Bogliole on drums.

== Background and recording ==
On July 25, 2025, Prong announced that they had signed with Napalm Records. On July 7, 2026, the band announced their self-titled album, making it their first with Napalm Records. Victor stated that Prong could be the band's best one to date and the best-sounding ever.

Prong was recorded at Westfall Recording in Farmingdale, New York and mixed and mastered by Andy Sneap at Backstage Studios in Derbyshire, England.

== Release and promotion ==
Prong was released on November 6, 2026. On August 4, the band released the album's lead single "The Banner". On September 22, they released the second single "Fear the Sun".

Prong will began touring in late 2026 to support the self-titled album starting with the Uprising Euro Tour 2026, which will take place in November.

== Track listing ==
No.	Title	Length
1.	"The Banner"	2:39
2.	"New Commission"	3:14
3.	"The Uprising"	3:31
4.	"Uncertain Truth"	3:59
5.	"Fear the Sun"	3:22
6.	"Commonsense Resolution"	3:50
7.	"Doomed World"	3:35
8.	"Proportionate Response"	2:46
9.	"Transgression"	2:35
10.	"Simulated Drowning"	3:50
11.	"Our Continuance"	4:46
12.	"Out of Body" (bonus track)	3:29
13.	"Cruel Summer" (Bananarama cover; bonus track)	3:28
Total length:		45:04

== Personnel ==
Prong

- Tommy Victor — guitars, vocals
- Christopher Dean — bass
- Tyler Bogliole — drums

Additional personnel

- Tommy Victor — production

== Charts ==
Chart performance for Prong
Chart (2026)	Peak position
French Physical Albums (SNEP)	144
French Rock & Metal Albums (SNEP)	44
UK Independent Albums Breakers (Official Charts)	13
