= Catharsis (American band) =

American hardcore band

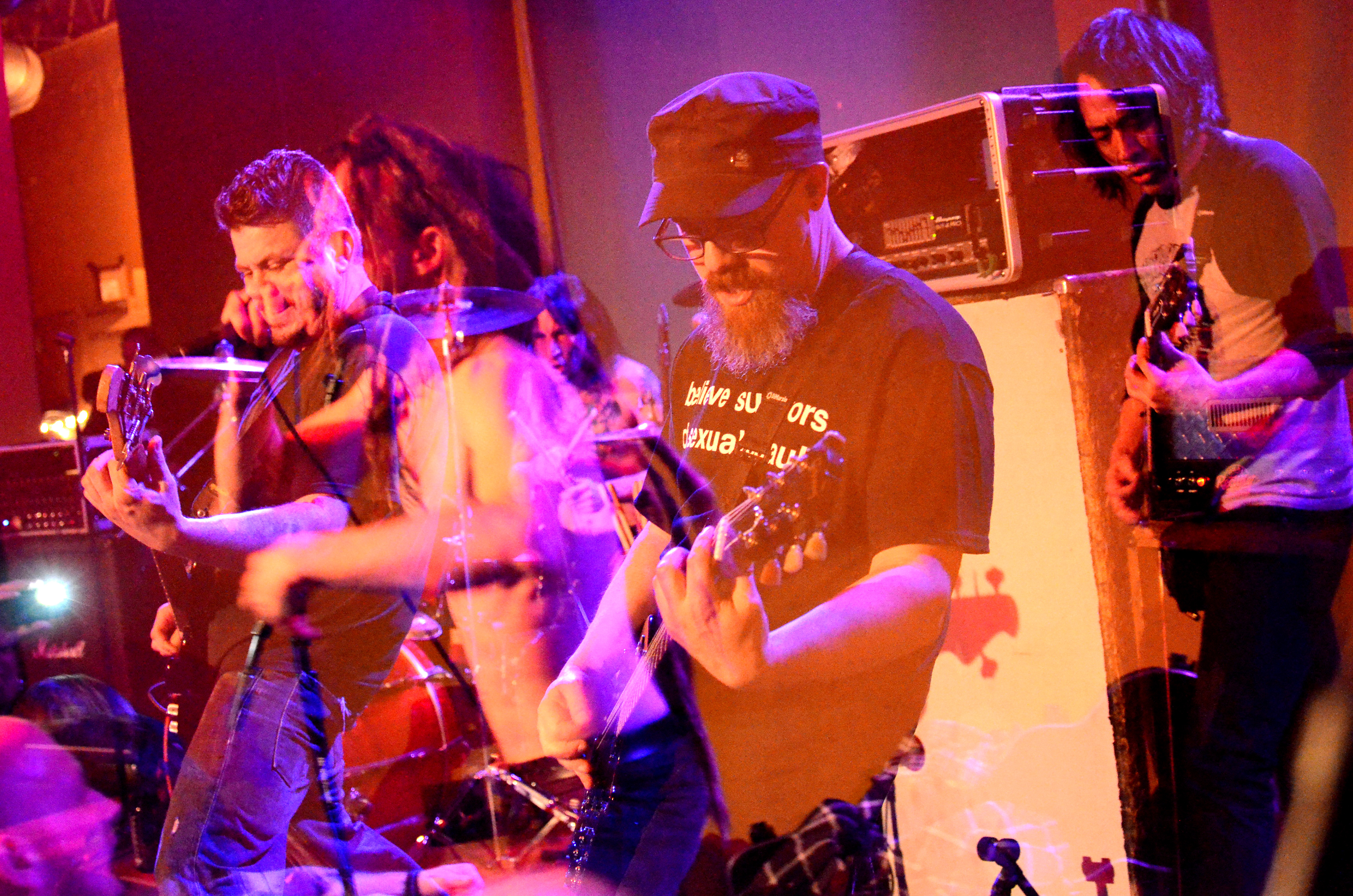
- Catharsis live 1/17/2013 at King's Barcade in Raleigh, NC

Background information
- Origin: Chapel Hill, North Carolina, United States
- Genres: Hardcore punk
- Years active: 1994–2002, 2012–present
- Labels: Fifth Column Conspiracy; CrimethInc.
- Members: Brian D Jimmy Chang; Matt Miller; Ernie Hayes; Gabe A
- Past members: Alexei Rodriguez; Stef; Josh Mosh; Christopher Huggins; Mark Dixon; Johnathan Raine; Dan Young

Catharsis is an American anarchist hardcore punk band from North Carolina, active 1994-2002 and since 2012. They have performed throughout the United States, Europe, and South America.

== History ==
Catharsis was formed in 1994 in Chapel Hill, North Carolina.

They released two studio albums: Samsara (1997) and Passion (1999), in addition to several split albums, EPs, and compilations. Almost all of their releases have been published independently by CrimethInc., demonstrating the horizontal and self-managed approach to music production that is characteristic to the do-it-yourself hardcore underground.

In January 2013, the band played four shows to promote their box set Light from a Dead Star. Since then, they have had sporadic performances in the United States and Europe. On August 1, 2025, they released a new full-length LP, Hope against Hope.

== Other projects ==
Several members of the band went on to join or form other bands, such as Zegota, Paint It Black, Requiem, 3 Inches Of Blood, Trial, Neptune, Undying, Walls of Jericho, and Cathode.

== Style and Influences ==
While positioning themselves in the hardcore punk milieu, they draw influence from metallic hardcore, crust punk, death metal, and d-beat, as well as classical, post-rock, and reggae elements.

Catharsis members have cited Integrity, Neurosis, His Hero Is Gone, Breakdown, Starkweather, Amebix, Godspeed You! Black Emperor, Diamanda Galás, GISM, and Refused as inspirations. SECT and Spencer Chamberlain of Underoath cite the group as a major influence.

The song "Deserts Without Mirages" from the album Passion has a reggae influence, due to the band's admiration for Peter Tosh, also following other bands such as The Clash and Nausea. It also references "The Dead Flag Blues" by Godspeed You! Black Emperor. On the same album, the band samples Jim Jarmusch's Dead Man.

Their sound is dark, melancholic, and dynamic, and they frequently employ unusual time signatures. Members of the band embrace veganism and straight edge, although this is not a label for the band.

The band's lyrics draw on influences from poetry, philosophy, mythology, religion, and politics. As literary and cultural studies scholar Gerfried Ambrosch observes, the song "Arsonist's Prayer" from the band's 2001 split release with Newborn "draws from many sources, including the writings of Octavio Paz, John Keats, George Orwell, and Robert Frost, Abrahamic religion, Nietzschean philosophy, dada, anarchist theory and praxis, and ultimately, the fifth and final section of T. S. Eliot's The Waste Land, “What the Thunder Said.'" Journalist Aaron Lake Smith cites lyrics from the song "Duende (The Soil Is Closer Than the Sky)" from Passion as exemplifying "the inverted, heretical call of religion that was everywhere in the subculture" of punk anarchism in the 1990s and 2000s.

"Arsonist's Prayer" is an extraordinary piece of poetry and an intense musical experience. Hardly any of the sixty-two lines contained in this ten-minute song—an eternity by punk standards—are end-stopped. There are sentences that spread out over entire verse paragraphs (enjambment), some of them employing complex, hypotactic syntaxes. Rather than follow a particular formula—there is no verse or chorus—"Arsonist's Prayer" constructs its own narrative of conflict and resolution, dynamically alternating between different levels of intensity. The heavier passages are perhaps best described as—nomen est omen—cathartic. With its many intertextual references—from Greek mythology to Abrahamic religion to Friedrich Nietzsche to Octavio Paz—the song creates an intricate web of meaning, summoning and commanding a host of external voices... The dark, allusive rhetoric, post-apocalyptic imagery, and atmospheric sound of Amebix constitute another aesthetic reference point.

— Gerfried Ambrosch, The Poetry of Punk: The Meaning Behind Punk Rock and Hardcore Lyrics, p. 165

== Current Members ==
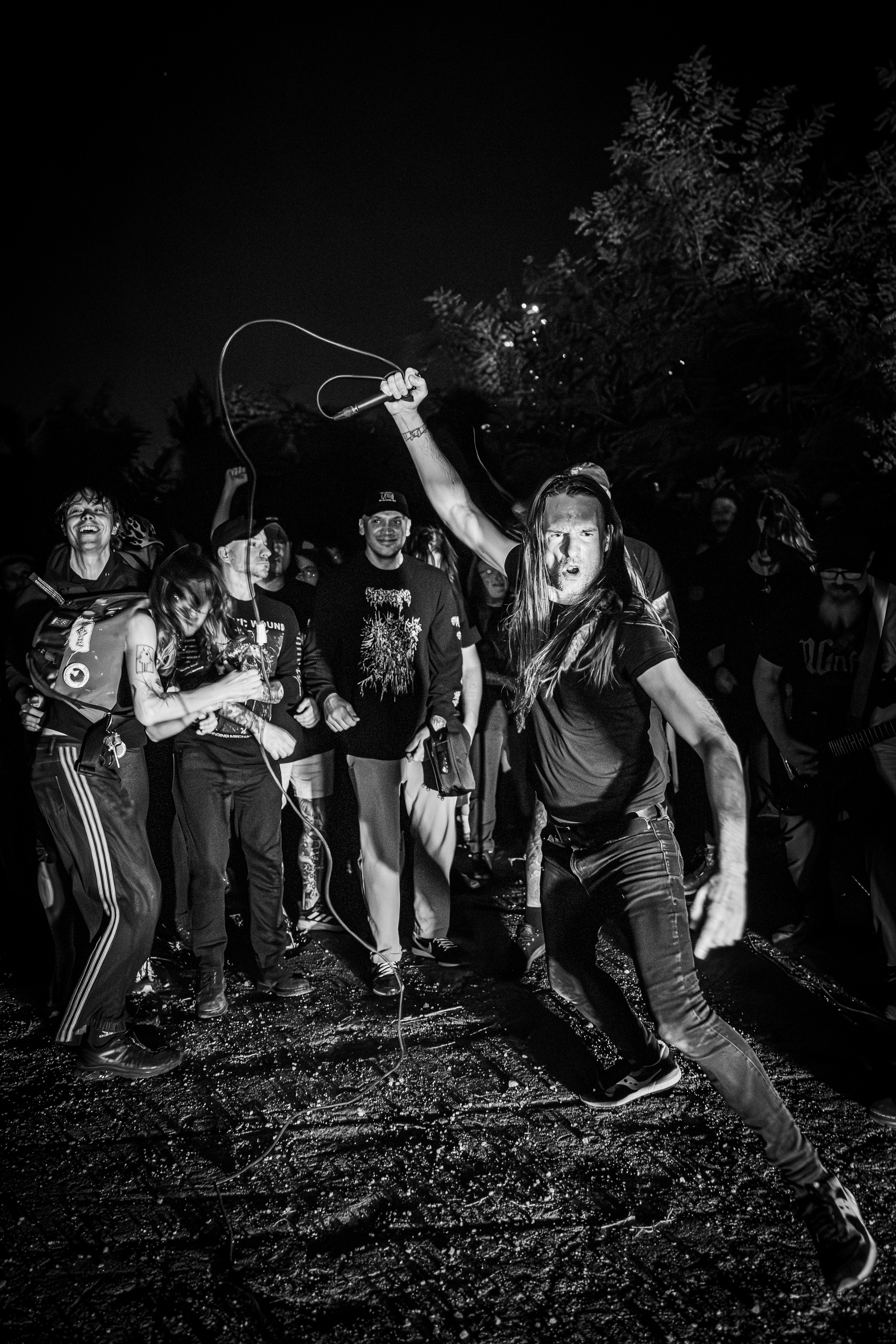
Brian from Catharsis performing in an undisclosed location in Williamsburg, Brooklyn on September 12th 2025

- Brian D - vocals, in-studio guitar (1994–2002, 2012–present)
- Jimmy Chang - guitar (1995–96, 2012–present)
- Matt Miller - guitar, bass (1996–2001, 2012–present)
- Ernie Hayes - bass (1998–2001, 2012–present)
- Gabe A - drums (2026–present)

== Past Members ==
- Alexei Rodriguez - drums (1994–2002, 2012–2026)
- Rob Davis - bass (2001–2002)
- Stef - guitar (2000–2002)
- Christopher Huggins - guitar (1994)
- Mark Dixon - bass (1994)
- Dan Young - guitar (1996–98)
- Josh Mosh - bass (2001)

== Discography ==
Studio albums

- Samsara CD/LP (1997, CrimethInc./Goodlife)
- Passion CD/LP (1999, CrimethInc./Scorched Earth Policy)
- Hope against Hope LP (2025, CrimethInc./No Gods No Masters/Refuse)

EP, demos and splits

- Fall CS (1994, Inside Front)
- Catharsis 7" (1995, Endless Fight)
- Catharsis / Gehenna LP (split with Gehenna, 1997, Wicked Witch)
- Catharsis / Newspeak CD (split with Newspeak, 1999, Liberation)
- Catharsis / Newborn CD/LP (split with Newborn, 2001, Scorched Earth Policy)
- Crimethinc. Bootleg Series I CD/LP (live split with Zegota and Gehenna, 2004, CrimethInc.)

Compilation albums

- Catharsis CD (1996, CrimethInc.)
- Light From A Dead Star LP (2013, Refuse/CrimethInc.)
- Light From A Dead Star I LP (2013, Refuse/CrimethInc.)
- Light From A Dead Star II LP (2013, Refuse/CrimethInc.)
