= X – No Absolutes =

Studio album by Prong
- Released: February 5, 2016
- Genres: Groove metal; thrash metal
- Length: 44:17
- Label: Steamhammer/SPV
- Producers: Tommy Victor; Chris Collier

Prong chronology
Songs from the Black Hole (2015)	X – No Absolutes (2016)	Zero Days (2017)

X – No Absolutes is the eleventh studio album by American heavy metal band Prong. It was released on February 5, 2016, through Steamhammer/SPV record label. The record was produced by the band's guitarist/vocalist Tommy Victor and engineer Chris Collier. The members on the album consisted of Victor, bassist Jason Christopher, and drummer Art Cruz. Christopher and Cruz had performed on Prong's prior album, 2015's Songs from the Black Hole; thus, it was the first time that Prong's lineup had stayed exactly the same between albums since 1990 (when the band's original lineup had released three albums between 1987 and 1990).

Victor has described the songs from X – No Absolutes as "a collection of riff intensified crushers, furious barn burners, and fist pumping sing-a-longs."

== Critical reception ==
Professional ratings
Aggregate scores
Source	Rating
Metacritic	74/100
Review scores
Source	Rating
Classic Rock	3.5/5 stars
Exclaim!	8/10
Revolver	4/5

X – No Absolutes has received generally positive reviews. At Metacritic, which assigns a normalized rating out of 100 to reviews from mainstream critics, the album has an average score of 74 based on 4 reviews, indicating "generally favorable reviews". Writing for Classic Rock, Malcolm Dome described the record as "the sound of Prong feeling comfortable in 2016" and "still underground and recognisable as the band who snapped our fingers and necks, but also adding essential modern detail." Chris Ayers of Exclaim! stated: "Though it's impossible to rewind to the MTV-fuelled frenzy around 1994's Cleansing, this album shows that Victor, who turns 50 this year, still schools bands half his age with focus and mettle." Loudwire's Chad Bowar noted the record to be a "very efficient 45 minute album, with very little filler." Revolver wrote that the record was "charged with brawn and brains—thrashy dynamics, chunky grooves, ferocious metal energy, and Tommy Victor’s sharp-tongued socio-political observations."

== Track listing ==
No.	Title	Length
1.	"Ultimate Authority"	2:54
2.	"Sense of Ease"	4:05
3.	"Without Words"	3:19
4.	"Cut and Dry"	3:52
5.	"No Absolutes"	3:18
6.	"Do Nothing"	3:40
7.	"Belief System"	3:22
8.	"Soul Sickness"	3:05
9.	"In Spite of Hindrances"	2:45
10.	"Ice Runs Through My Veins"	4:05
11.	"Worth Pursuing"	3:13
12.	"With Dignity"	3:15
13.	"Universal Law" (bonus track)	3:25
Total length:		44:17

== Personnel ==
Album personnel as adapted from liner notes.

Prong

- Tommy Victor — guitars, vocals
- Jason Christopher — bass
- Art Cruz — drums

Additional personnel

- Tommy Victor — production
- Chris Collier — production, engineer, mixing, mastering
- Sebastian Rohde — artwork
- Firma Freimauer — artwork
- Neil Zlozower — photography
- Secret Playground — photography

== Chart positions ==
Chart (2016)	Peak position
German Albums Chart	87
US Heatseekers Albums (Billboard)	7
