= Alexei Rodriguez =

Puerto Rican drummer

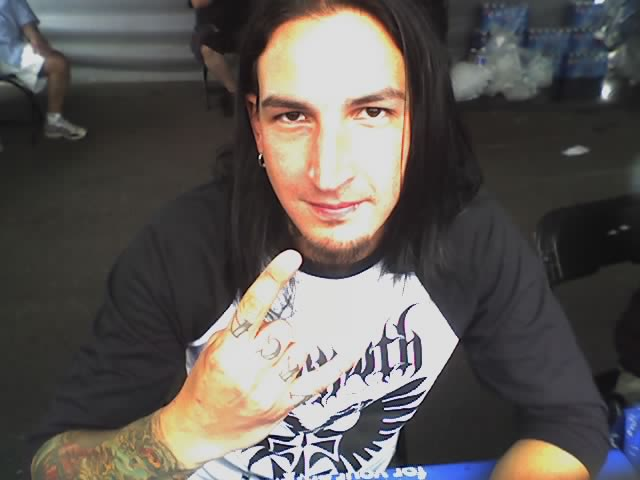
- Rodriguez at Ozzfest 2007

Background information
- Origin: San Juan, Puerto Rico
- Genres: Heavy metal, metalcore, hardcore punk, black metal
- Occupation: Musician
- Instruments: Drums

Alexei Rodriguez is a Puerto Rican drummer. He is known for his time in the metal band Prong (NYC/LA), Canadian heavy metal band 3 Inches of Blood (Vancouver, BC), metalcore band Walls of Jericho (Detroit, MI), as well as Trial (Seattle, WA) and anarcho-punk/hardcore outfit Catharsis (North Carolina).

== Career ==
In 1989, Rodriguez met his classmate and future bandmate, B.Diablo, and the two began to play music together the following year. After graduating in 1992, the two began conspiring to form Catharsis, which came to full fruition in 1994, borrowing two of their friends from local ska band, Otis Reem to complete the lineup. Following two early demo tapes in 1992 and 1994, the band completed their first official EP, eponymous(1995), followed by two full-length albums, Samsara (1997) and Passion (1999), as well as split EPs with Gehenna (Reno/San Diego), Newspeak (Brazil), and Newborn. As with his bandmates, Rodriguez opted for pseudonyms on most of said releases. With Ümlaut, a parodical anarcho-crust band featuring members of Catharsis he also played on an EP, Finland (1999), and on a full-length album titled Havok Wreakers (2001), again under an assumed name (Barøn Bürri Von Blixen). In 2002, Rodriguez contributed lead and backing vocals to Finnish hardcore/punk band Endstand on two tracks from their split-EP with Kafka. In 1999, Rodriguez performed on the full-length album Are These Our Lives? (via Equal Vision Records) with Seattle hardcore outfit Trial, under the assumed name Jesus L. Pecador.

In 2003, Rodriguez moved to Detroit to start a new band with former members of Walls of Jericho, a Detroit-based metalcore band, although in order to begin touring sooner, the group opted to continue under the same name, and retain many songs written in their previous incarnation with drummer Wes Keely. He played on WOJ's second full-length album All Hail the Dead in 2004, as well as on the live video footage from the Hellfest 2003 DVD, and the music video for the single, There's No 'I' in 'Fuck You'. He was recruited into 3 Inches of Blood in 2005, by their bassist and his former Trial bandmate after the departure of their second drummer, Matt Wood. Rodriguez recorded one album and one EP with 3 Inches of Blood, Fire Up the Blades and Trial of Champions, respectively, before being fired from the band for assaulting Saxon drummer Nigel Glockler in November 2007 (although Rodriguez was himself beaten up by bouncers following this incident). Days after tracking drums for the 3 Inches of Blood album, Fire Up The Blades, he also tracked a full-length album with German friends Robin Staps (The Ocean Collective) and Matthias Dabrowski (Nothing, Mönster, Costa's Cake House), which was unfortunately shelved before its completion, due to The Ocean's frantic touring schedule and the difficulties in finding an adequate singer.

While briefly residing in Los Angeles, Rodriguez met Tommy Victor (Prong, Danzig, Ministry), who invited him to play drums for a remix Victor contributed to KMFDM's album Krieg, as well as to join an updated version of Prong with Victor and bassist Tony Campos (Static-X, Asesino, Ministry). The line-up did two American tours with Soulfly and another with Fear Factory. In 2009, Rodriguez joined former Trial bandmate Timm McIntosh (ex-Champion, ex-Amendment Eighteen), playing drums for his new band, Wait in Vain's debut full-length, Seasons on Panic! Records, which picked up musically where Trial had left off. Wait in Vain also joined Trial at the Burning Fight festival in Chicago in 2009, where Trial (including the late 3 Inches of Blood bassist Brian Redman) performed to a sold-out audience at The Metro, alongside fellow 90's hardcore stalwarts Unbroken and 80's icons Killing Time, among others. That same year, he also anonymously tracked drums for Taiwan's most popular black metal band, Chthonic on their third full-length, Mirror of Retribution, which was recorded by Volbeat and former Anthrax guitarist, Rob Caggiano.

In between Prong tours, Rodriguez met Los Angeles-based black metal act Hail the Night and recorded an EP with them entitled No God We Trust (NGWT), which was shelved before its release. Citing a serious political differences (i.e., racism, xenophobia) with the frontman, Rodriguez cut ties with them shortly thereafter. During a subsequent Prong run with Static-X, Prong was forced to cancel two weeks of appearances in the middle due to financial complications resulting from mismanagement, and during the break, Rodriguez suffered a hand injury and flew home. At that point his drum tech (and future replacement) Art Cruz (Lamb of God, Winds of Plague) took over for the remainder. Rodriguez then soon announced his decision to leave the band, but not before embarking on one final European tour. He recorded two full-length albums with Prong, Carved into Stone and Unleashed in the West: Live in Berlin. In 2011, Rodriguez again joined with a former Trial alum, Greg Bennick on the debut full-length, Of Roots & Wings, by Vancouver-based act Between Earth & Sky. The band also featured Sean Lande (Strain, By a Thread) and Happy Kreter (Gob) on guitar, and was recorded by Blair Calibaba (Strain, By a Thread) and Paul Forgues (Slayer, Hatebreed). In August of 2024, Rodriguez recorded the drums of Catharsis' album, Hope Against Hope while wearing an ankle monitor.
