= 100% Live =

Live album by Prong
- Released: October 29, 2002
- Recorded: 2002
- Venue: Double Door, Chicago; Royal Oak Theatre, Detroit
- Genre: Groove metal, thrash metal
- Length: 60:03
- Label: Locomotive
- Producer: Pat Regan, Tommy Victor

Prong chronology
| Rude Awakening (1996) | 100% Live (2002) | Scorpio Rising (2003) |

Professional ratings
Review scores
| Source | Rating |
|---|---|
| AllMusic | 2.5/5 stars |
| The Collector's Guide to Heavy Metal | 4/10 |

100% Live is a live album by American metal band Prong. It was recorded at the Double Door, in Chicago, and at the Royal Oak Theater in Detroit.

== Track listing ==
| No. | Title | Length |
|---|---|---|
| 1. | "Rude Awakening" | 4:35 |
| 2. | "Initiation" (previously unreleased; later released as "Embrace the Depth" on Scorpio Rising) | 3:53 |
| 3. | "Broken Peace" | 6:12 |
| 4. | "Controller" | 4:08 |
| 5. | "Snap Your Fingers, Snap Your Neck" | 4:23 |
| 6. | "Beg to Differ" | 4:32 |
| 7. | "Dark Signs" | 3:30 |
| 8. | "Another Worldly Device" | 3:29 |
| 9. | "Prove You Wrong" | 3:34 |
| 10. | "Close the Door" | 4:31 |
| 11. | "Disbelief" | 1:48 |
| 12. | "Whose Fist Is This Anyway?" | 4:55 |
| 13. | "Cut-Rate" | 5:14 |
| 14. | "Unconditional" | 5:12 |

== Personnel ==
- Tommy Victor – vocals, guitar
- Monte Pittman – guitar
- Brian Perry – bass
- Dan Laudo – drums
