= Power of the Damn Mixxxer =

Remix album by Prong
- Released: May 12, 2009
- Recorded: Sonic Ranch, Tornillo, Texas
- Length: 58:46
- Label: 13th Planet
- Producers: Chris Kniker, Tommy Victor

Prong chronology
| Power of the Damager (2007) | Power of the Damn Mixxxer (2009) | Carved into Stone (2012) |

Professional ratings
Review scores
| Source | Rating |
|---|---|
| AllMusic | 3.5/5 stars |
| Collector's Guide to Heavy Metal | 4/10 |
| Type 3 Media | 7/10 stars |

Power of the Damn Mixxxer is a remix album by American metal band Prong. It consists of remixed versions of all the tracks from their 2007 album, Power of the Damager.

== Track listing ==
| No. | Title | Length |
|---|---|---|
| 1. | "Worst of It (Worst of the Worst Mix)" (Remixed by Jon Clayden) | 4:13 |
| 2. | "Can't Stop the Bleeding (SMack! Mix)" (Remixed by Xris Flam) | 4:17 |
| 3. | "The Banishment (Wolfzilla & The Angry Moon Mix)" (Remixed by Rob Caggiano) | 5:52 |
| 4. | "Power of the Damager (Fabrication Mix)" (Remixed by Brian Harrah, Roman Marisak) | 3:38 |
| 5. | "3rd Option (Naked In The Cadillac Mix)" (Remixed by Kourtney Klien) | 3:45 |
| 6. | "Pure Ether (Big Riddim Mix)" (Remixed by AK1200, Genr8) | 4:41 |
| 7. | "Messages Inside of Me (Chicxulub Impactor Mix)" (Remixed by Seismologist) | 3:46 |
| 8. | "No Justice (Crackmix)" (Remixed by DJ? Acucrack) | 4:29 |
| 9. | "Looking for Them (Contagious Mix)" (Remixed by Virus) | 4:05 |
| 10. | "Spirit Guide (Reality's Edge Mix)" (Remixed by John Bechdel) | 4:24 |
| 11. | "Changing Ending Troubling Times (Abandoned Structures Mix)" (Remixed by Ampedelic) | 5:24 |
| 12. | "The Banishment (Bitter Harvest Mix)" (Remixed by Clayton Worbeck) | 5:42 |
| 13. | "Bad Fall (Smile On Your Face Mix)" (Remixed by Greg Puciato) | 4:22 |
| Total length: | | 56:48 |

== Personnel ==
- Tommy Victor - vocals, guitar
- Monte Pittman - bass, backing vocals
- Aaron Rossi - drums
- Al Jourgensen - keyboards on "The Banishment (Bitter Harvest Mix)"
