= Beg to Differ =

- Cover art by Pushead

Studio album by Prong
- Released: March 12, 1990
- Recorded: 1989
- Genres: Groove metal; thrash metal; crossover thrash
- Length: 45:24
- Label: Epic
- Producers: Mark Dodson, Prong

Prong chronology
Force Fed (1988)	Beg to Differ (1990)	Prove You Wrong (1991)

Beg to Differ is the second studio album by American heavy metal band Prong, released in 1990 through Epic Records. The album includes one live track ("Third from the Sun", a Chrome cover) recorded at CBGB's in New York City in 1989. Brian "Pushead" Schroeder did the design and cover artwork for the album. Part of the song "Lost and Found" was used for commercial breaks of MTV's Headbangers Ball in the early 1990s, while the music video for "Beg to Differ" would occasionally play on Headbangers Ball as well. Beg to Differ would ultimately become the third and final studio release to feature founding bassist Mike Kirkland.

== Musical style ==
Beg to Differ was the start of Prong's change in music direction, showcasing an experimentation with thrash metal arrangements and hardcore influences inspired by the likes of Bad Brains and Suicidal Tendencies. The album also stands as one of the earliest examples of the then-emerging subgenre of groove metal, predating Pantera's Cowboys from Hell by four months; this fact was later acknowledged by Prong vocalist and guitarist Tommy Victor, who argued, "[Beg to Differ] was the first groove metal record. It gets overlooked, but I don't know who came out with anything before that."

== Reception ==
Professional ratings
Review scores
Source	Rating
AllMusic	4.5/5 stars
Collector's Guide to Heavy Metal	6/10
Rolling Stone	4/5 stars

Beg to Differ has received mostly positive reviews. Eduardo Rivadavia of AllMusic wrote, "Prong's once diffuse, post-hardcore rumble solidifies into a tightly disciplined thrash metal attack on their first major label release, Beg to Differ. Also a more democratic affair than later efforts, the album finds guitarist Tommy Victor and bassist Mike Kirkland alternating lead vocals as well as writing credits. And drummer Ted Parsons is equally impressive, providing a thunderous rhythmic foundation of Neil Peart-like diversity and precision."

Adam McCann of Metal Digest referred to Beg to Differ as "the superb 1990 album", and wrote, "When it comes to heavy metal, Prong may just be one of the most underrated and overlooked bands ever. With Beg to Differ, Prong delivered riff after riff of not only thrash metal, but thrash with the uptempo pumping riffage of crossover thrash whilst also deliver the meat and potatoes offered from the then burgeoning groove metal scene with both Exhorder and Prong laying the foundations for what would come very, very soon with Pantera".

== Track listing ==
No.	Title	Music	Length
1.	"For Dear Life"	Tommy Victor	3:26
2.	"Steady Decline"	Victor, Mike Kirkland	4:13
3.	"Beg to Differ"	Victor, Ted Parsons	4:15
4.	"Lost and Found"	Victor	4:05
5.	"Your Fear"	Victor, Kirkland, Parsons	4:51
6.	"Take It in Hand"	Victor	3:43
7.	"Intermenstrual, D.S.B." (instrumental)	Victor, Parsons	3:12
8.	"Right to Nothing"	Victor	2:57
9.	"Prime Cut"	Victor, Parsons	3:49
10.	"Just the Same"	Victor, Kirkland, Parsons	4:41
11.	"Third from the Sun" (live, Chrome cover)	Helios Creed, Damon Edge	5:56
Total length:			40:58

== Personnel ==
- Tommy Victor – vocals, guitar
- Mike Kirkland – bass, vocals
- Ted Parsons – drums

=== Production ===
- Produced by Prong (Mike Kirkland, Ted Parsons, Tommy Victor), Mark Dodson
- Executive producer: Bob Feineigle
- Engineers: Mark Dodson, Steve McAllister
- Assistant engineer: Jamie Locke
- Mixing: Mark Dodson
- Mastering: Greg Calbi, Roger Lomas
