= Rude Awakening (Prong album) =

Studio album by Prong
- Released: May 14, 1996
- Recorded: 1995
- Genres: Industrial metal; groove metal; alternative metal
- Length: 45:50
- Label: Epic
- Producers: Terry Date, Tommy Victor

Prong chronology
Cleansing (1994)	Rude Awakening (1996)	100% Live (2002)

Rude Awakening is the fifth studio album by American metal band Prong. It is an enhanced CD but was also released as a special limited edition on 12" red vinyl. The album was reissued in 2008 as a digipak version, featuring four remixes of the "Rude Awakening" single and a new booklet.

Rude Awakening entered the Billboard charts at No. 107 and sold 10,000 units in the United States in its first week. It is the last Prong album to feature Ted Parsons and Paul Raven, as well as the band's last album on Epic Records.

== Background and musical style ==
Continuing from the developments on 1994's Cleansing, Rude Awakening sees a further pursuit of the industrial style. Following the departure of keyboardist John Bechdel in 1995, electronic contributions would be managed by Charlie Clouser of Nine Inch Nails. The tracks are also comparatively slower than what could be found on prior releases by the band. The album's opener, "Controller", contains an identical riff to the song "Doomsayer" by Argyle Park. Frontman/guitarist Tommy Victor had contributed to the latter song and reused the guitar part for the former.

== Reception ==
Professional ratings
Review scores
Source	Rating
AllMusic	3/5 stars
Chronicles of Chaos	8/10
Collector's Guide to Heavy Metal	6/10
Kerrang!	2/5 stars
Ox-Fanzine	3/5 stars
Rock Hard	9.5/10

Reviewing the title track, Billboard wrote that the single's "assaulting, deviant style" shows why Prong is popular. Jenni Glenn of CMJ New Music Monthly wrote that the album is heavier and angrier than Cleansing, blending thrash metal and industrial music.

== Track listing ==
All tracks written by Prong except "Controller" (Prong and Scott Albert) and "Slicing" (Prong and Joe Bishara Kebbe).

1. "Controller" – 3:39
2. "Caprice" – 2:47
3. "Rude Awakening" – 4:18
4. "Unfortunately" – 3:08
5. "Face Value" – 4:09
6. "Avenue of the Finest" – 3:37
7. "Slicing" – 3:29
8. "Without Hope" – 3:13
9. "Mansruin" – 3:29
10. "Innocence Gone" – 3:11
11. "Dark Signs" – 3:22
12. "Close the Door" – 4:05
13. "Proud Division" – 5:46

== Personnel ==
- Tommy Victor - guitars, vocals
- Paul Raven - bass
- Ted Parsons - drums

Additional personnel

- Charlie Clouser - drum programming, keyboards

== Chart positions ==
Chart (1996)	Peak position
US Billboard 200	107
