= Ruining Lives =

Studio album by Prong
- Released: April 23, 2014
- Genre: Groove metal, thrash metal
- Length: 41:47
- Label: Steamhammer/SPV
- Producer: Steve Evetts, Tommy Victor

Prong chronology
Carved into Stone (2012)	Ruining Lives (2014)	Songs from the Black Hole (2015)

Ruining Lives is the ninth studio album by American metal band Prong. Released on April 23, 2014, the album was produced by Tommy Victor and Steve Evetts. On April 29, 2014, a lyric video was released for the song "Turnover".

== Track listing ==
All tracks are written by Tommy Victor and Chris Collier, except where noted.

No.	Title	Music	Length
1.	"Turnover"		3:35
2.	"The Barriers"		3:31
3.	"Windows Shut"		4:02
4.	"Remove, Separate Self"		3:58
5.	"Ruining Lives"	Victor, Jason Christopher, Alexei Rodriguez	4:41
6.	"Absence of Light"		3:42
7.	"The Book of Change"		3:22
8.	"Self Will Run Riot"		3:51
9.	"Come to Realize"		3.48
10.	"Chamber of Thought"	Victor, Collier, Justin Manning	3:44
11.	"Limitations and Validations"		3:35
12.	"Retreat" (bonus track on digipak and double-vinyl releases)		4:00
Total length:			45:53

== Personnel ==
- Tommy Victor – guitars, vocals, bass
- Chris Collier – drums
- Sammy D'Ambruoso – arrangements on "Windows Shut"
- Justin Manning – guitar solo on "Chamber of Thought"

== Chart performance ==
Year	Chart	Position
2014	Germany (Media Control AG)	77
