= Scorpio Rising (Prong album) =

Studio album by Prong
- Released: November 4, 2003
- Recorded: December 2002 – February 2003
- Genre: Nu metal
- Length: 48:48
- Label: Locomotive Music
- Producer: Stevo Bruno, Tommy Victor

Prong chronology
100% Live (2002)	Scorpio Rising (2003)	Power of the Damager (2007)

Scorpio Rising is the sixth studio album by American metal band Prong, their first after a gap of seven years. The song "Embrace the Depth" first appeared on the 2002 live album 100% Live under the title "Initiation", and was co-written by Pat Lachman.

== Track listing ==
No.	Title	Length
1.	"Detached"	3:23
2.	"All Knowing Force"	2:39
3.	"Embrace the Depth"	4:01
4.	"Reactive Mind"	2:21
5.	"Regal"	2:41
6.	"Inner Truth"	2:44
7.	"Avoid Promises"	3:13
8.	"Siriusly Emerging"	3:41
9.	"Assurances"	3:19
10.	"Out of This Realm"	3:10
11.	"Entrance of the Eclipse"	4:58
12.	"Letter to a 'Friend'"	4:10
13.	"Red Martial Working"	3:44
14.	"Hidden Agenda"	4:37
Total length:		48:48

== Reception ==
Professional ratings
Review scores
Source	Rating
AllMusic	2.5/5 stars
Chronicles of Chaos	6/10
Collector's Guide to Heavy Metal	4/10
Metal Hammer	8/10

Chronicles of Chaos gave a neutral impression of the album, with a general summary of "average" across all facets - music, lyrics, and vocals. Of particular comparison to previous albums was the failure of any particular song to stand out in quality.

Decibel provided a mixed review, complimenting Tommy Victor's "big riffs" but otherwise feeling it under-performed with an ugly cover and under-cooked production. In contrast to COC's review, Decibel specifically noted that each song did use unique mixes of riffs, but that the differences were subtle to the level of requiring specific attention to note differences.

AllMusic gave a mixed review, complimenting "The gritty guitars, the stop/start rhythms, the anger and the vicious ill will", but noting the lack of standout tunes and the absence of any general difference from their earlier music.

== Personnel ==
- Tommy Victor – vocals, guitar, bass
- Monte Pittman – bass, guitar
- Dan Laudo – drums
