= Songs from the Black Hole (Prong album) =

Studio album by Prong
- Released: March 31, 2015
- Studio: Trixx Studios in Berlin, Germany
- Genre: Crossover thrash
- Length: 42:10
- Label: Steamhammer/SPV
- Producer: Tommy Victor

Prong chronology
Ruining Lives (2014)	Songs from the Black Hole (2015)	X – No Absolutes (2016)

Songs from the Black Hole is a cover album by American metal band Prong, released on March 31, 2015. According to frontman Tommy Victor, the goal of the cover album was to explore musical roots of the band and "the vast landscape that makes up the band's sound". He stated, it should visualize "the theme of urban decay, desolation, insecurity and ultimate change".

The basic tracks were recorded with Peter Funke in Trixx Studios in Berlin, Germany. The album was mixed and mastered by Chris Collier at Mission:Black Studios in Santa Clarita, California, with additional guitars also recorded there. Vocals were recorded by Collier at Lynchbox Studios also in Santa Clarita. Jason Christopher added background vocals on "Give Me the Cure". The cover artwork was created by Mike Lopez.

== Reception ==
Professional ratings
Aggregate scores
Source	Rating
Metacritic	66/100
Review scores
Source	Rating
AllMusic	3.5/5 stars
Classic Rock	3/5 stars
Record Collector	3/5 stars

Songs from the Black Hole received mixed reviews from critics. On Metacritic, the album holds a score of 66/100 based on four reviews, indicating "generally favorable reviews".

== Track listing ==
1. "Doomsday" (Discharge) - 2:44
2. "Vision Thing" (The Sisters of Mercy) - 4:44
3. "Goofy's Concern" (Butthole Surfers) - 2:44
4. "Kids of the Black Hole" (Adolescents) - 5:28
5. "The Bars" (Black Flag) - 4:18
6. "Seeing Red" (Killing Joke) - 6:18
7. "Don't Want to Know If You Are Lonely" (Hüsker Dü) - 3:32
8. "Give Me the Cure" (Fugazi) - 3:08
9. "Banned in D.C." (Bad Brains) - 2:22
10. "Cortez the Killer" (Neil Young) - 6:52

== Personnel ==
- Tommy Victor – guitars, vocals
- Jason Christopher – bass, additional vocals on "Give Me the Cure"
- Art Cruz – drums
