= Zero Days (album) =

Studio album by Prong
- Released: July 28, 2017
- Genre: Groove metal; thrash metal
- Length: 50:32
- Label: Steamhammer/SPV
- Producer: Tommy Victor; Chris Collier

Prong chronology
| X – No Absolutes (2016) | Zero Days (2017) | State of Emergency (2023) |

Zero Days is the twelfth studio album by American heavy metal band Prong. It was released on July 28, 2017 through Steamhammer/SPV record label. The record was produced by the band's guitarist/vocalist Tommy Victor and longtime collaborator Chris Collier, the latter also engineering the album.

== Critical reception ==
Professional ratings
Review scores
| Source | Rating |
|---|---|
| Blabbermouth.net | 8/10 |
| Louder Sound | 3.5/5 stars |

Writing for Blabbermouth.net, Ray Van Horn Jr. stated: "As ever, Victor tinkers with the core sound by tapping into agro metal, hardcore, anthem rock and industrial while remaining true to the marching crunch and thrash that go into a Prong record." Invisible Oranges critic Tom Campagna described the record as "a solid thrash-heavy album with tendencies leaning toward the band's salad days of industrial music." Emma Johnston of Louder Sound regarded the record as a "focused and determined work with a fiery heart," further stating that "this old dog has plenty of bite left in it." Loudwire's Michael Christopher noted that "Tommy Victor has shown that not only is he a major fan of metal in general, but he's got ideas and excitement to share."

== Track listing ==
All tracks written by Prong.

1. "However It May End" — 3:36
2. "Zero Days" — 3:35
3. "Off the Grid" — 3:18
4. "Divide and Conquer" — 3:17
5. "Forced into Tolerance" — 3:17
6. "Interbeing" — 3:50
7. "Blood Out of Stone" — 4:12
8. "Operation of the Moral Law" — 3:31
9. "The Whispers" — 3:20
10. "Self Righteous Indignation" — 4:14
11. "Rulers of the Collective" — 3:02
12. "Compulsive Future Projection" — 3:10
13. "Wasting of the Dawn" — 4:39
14. "Reasons to Be Fearful" (bonus track) — 3:31

== Personnel ==
Album personnel as adapted from the liner notes.

Prong

- Tommy Victor — guitars, vocals
- Mike Longworth — bass
- Art Cruz — drums

Additional personnel

- Tommy Victor — production
- Chris Collier — production, engineering, mixing, mastering choir vocals
- Matt Williams — additional backing vocals, choir vocals
- Greg Harrison — guitar solo on "Zero Days"
- Chris Cannella — guitar solo on "Interbeing"
- Marzi Montazeri — guitar solo on "Operation of the Moral Law"
- Fred Ziomek — additional guitars on "Rulers of the Collective"
- Jason Williams — choir vocals
- Steve Hernandez — choir vocals
- Justin "Rodan" Manning — choir vocals
- Sebastian Rohde — artwork
- Firma Freimauer — artwork

== Chart positions ==
| Chart (2017) | Peak position |
|---|---|
| German Albums Chart | 86 |
| Swiss Music Charts | 99 |
| US Heatseekers Albums (Billboard) | 11 |
