= Carved into Stone =

Studio album by Prong
- Released: April 24, 2012
- Genre: Groove metal, thrash metal
- Length: 42:26
- Label: Long Branch/SPV
- Producer: Steve Evetts

Prong chronology
Power of the Damn Mixxxer (2009)	Carved into Stone (2012)	Ruining Lives (2014)

Carved into Stone is the eighth studio album by American metal band Prong. It reached No. 13 at the Top Heatseekers chart. Released on April 24, 2012, via Long Branch Records/SPV, the work was produced by Steve Evetts with cover artwork by Vance Kelly.

== Reception ==
Professional ratings
Aggregate scores
Source	Rating
Metacritic	84/100
Review scores
Source	Rating
Metal Hammer (UK)	80/100
Exclaim!	(mixed)
Record Collector	2/5 stars
Metal.de	8/10

Carved into Stone received positive reviews from critics. On Metacritic, the album holds a score of 84/100 based on four reviews.

== Track listing ==
All tracks are written by Tommy Victor, Tony Campos and Alexei Rodriguez, except where noted.

No.	Title	Music	Length
1.	"Eternal Heat"		3:53
2.	"Keep On Living in Pain"		3:43
3.	"Ammunition"	Franky DeSmet-VanDamme, Mikey Doling, Victor	3:30
4.	"Revenge... Best Served Cold"	Mike Longworth, Victor	4:23
5.	"State of Rebellion"		3:55
6.	"Put Myself to Sleep"		3:46
7.	"List of Grievances"		2:54
8.	"Carved into Stone"		5:22
9.	"Subtract"		3.51
10.	"Path of Least Resistance"		4:15
11.	"Reinvestigate"		2:50
12.	"Feuer frei!" (Rammstein cover; bonus track)	Rammstein	3:18
Total length:			45:44

== Personnel ==
- Tommy Victor – guitars, lead vocals
- Tony Campos – bass, backing vocals
- Alexei Rodriguez – drums

== Chart performance ==
Year	Chart	Position
2012	US Top Heatseekers	13
