= Run Run Run (band) =

American indie rock band

Run Run Run is an American indie rock band from Los Angeles. The quintet consists of Xander Smith (vocals, guitar), Nic Speck (bass), Doug Palmer (guitar), Francisco DeCun (drums) and Alek Speck (keyboards/ percussion).

Rx3 is the brainchild of singer/songwriter Smith, who started the band after a trip out to Joshua Tree, CA in 2001 to make demos with Fred Drake at Rancho De La Luna (Earthlings, Queens of the Stone Age, Mark Lanegan). The resulting sound was abrasive indie rock mixed with late 1980s/1990s UK shoegaze and pop radio leaning vocal hooks. Their subsequent/official releases found Rx3 in the studio with producer Noah Shain as well as remixers and guest appearances by Z Trip, members of New Order, Bauhaus, Mumiy Troll and Madonna as well as mentor Steve Perry (ex-Journey frontman). After early roster changes, the band settled into its current line up in 2007. Rx3 has toured consistently since 2006 and has supported other acts such as The Strokes, Psychedelic Furs, Zombies, The Walkmen, Mumiy Troll, Trail of Dead, Cranes, Sparta, The Teenagers, Silversun Pickups and The Living End. In winter of 2012 Smith made his first solo singer/songwriter record called "Hey San Pedro" which was released on iTunes and the band's label, Song&Dance records on May 15, 2012. Rx3 is still active today.

== Discography ==
Run Run Run released their debut double album, Endless Winter on Song&Dance Records in the U.S. on May 16, 2006. A slightly different version was simultaneously put out by Magic Castle/Universal in Australia. In 2007, the band released their own EP, Good Company. On June 17, 2010, "Pico" their second full-length album became available through iTunes. In 2011, Rx3 put together a compilation of tracks from all three releases for territories outside the United States. This self-titled release, "Run Run Run" became available digitally on March 22, 2011. In Summer 2012, Rx3 released a single/video in Russia called "Do Svidaniya" which featured Russian singer Ilya Lagutenko from the band, Mumiy Troll. Rx3 has visited Russia and neighboring countries frequently as their music has become popular in this territory.
