= Paul Raven (musician) =

English musician

- Born: Paul Vincent Raven; 16 January 1961; Wolverhampton, England
- Died: 20 October 2007 (aged 46) Geneva, Switzerland
- Genres: Industrial rock; post-punk; heavy metal; industrial
- Occupation: Bassist
- Instrument: Bass guitar
- Years active: 1980–2007

Paul Vincent Raven (16 January 1961 – 20 October 2007) was an English bassist best known for his work in the post-punk group Killing Joke. He later played in the industrial music bands Prong, Ministry, Zilch, and briefly Godflesh.

== Biography ==
Raven was born on 16 January 1961 in Wolverhampton, Staffordshire. He was the son of folk musician Jon Raven, and nephew of author Michael Raven. His early musical career included stints in Neon Hearts, who released three singles from 1977 to 1979 and the album Popular Music in 1979, and the short-lived 1982 glam rock band, Kitsch, which also included Rook Randle and Tyla, before he would go on to larger success with his band, Dogs D'Amour. In the summer of 1980 he played bass with the also short-lived Tony McPhee's Turbo. The band played a few gigs and recorded a three-track session for Capitol Radio. Turbo included Clive Brooks, the drummer with Tony McPhee's band the Groundhogs (1972–1975).

Raven's big break came when he replaced original Killing Joke bassist Youth in mid-1982, just in time for the North American tour documented on the Ha! live EP and also in the photo book 'Land of Milk & Honey' which features previously unreleased photos by Tony Mottram (released January 2021). He was with the group through its most commercially successful period, appearing on the Fire Dances, Night Time and Brighter than a Thousand Suns albums, before leaving during the recording of 1988's Outside the Gate, rejoining in time for 1990's Extremities, Dirt & Various Repressed Emotions.

After touring in support of this album, Killing Joke split up, with all members except lead vocalist Jaz Coleman going on to form Murder, Inc. in 1991, adding vocalist Chris Connelly. During this time, Raven also participated in Pigface, a project conceived by drummer Martin Atkins, which operated with a fluid change of differing musicians in their lineup.

Killing Joke reformed in 1992, but it was with original bassist Youth back in the fold. Raven next joined Prong, appearing on their Cleansing and Rude Awakening albums. After leaving Prong in 1996, he began a career as a producer and remixer and also played with the group Zilch, along with hide, Joey Castillo and Ray McVeigh.

In 2002, Raven had been brought on for a Godflesh two-month tour of the United States, but the band disbanded just before departing. In 2003, Raven played bass on Exit Through Fear with Society 1 and performed on the subsequent tour for the album. He later left Society 1, rejoining Killing Joke for their 2003 release, Killing Joke (their second album by that name), and its follow up, Hosannas from the Basements of Hell. In 2005, Raven began working with Al Jourgensen of Ministry for their album Rio Grande Blood. In 2006, Raven completed a European and American tour with Ministry. In 2007, Raven wrote and recorded on Ministry's next studio album The Last Sucker and also began work together with Mark Gemini Thwaite (of The Mission and Peter Murphy's band) on a new project called Mob Research. Warrior Soul frontman Kory Clarke and ex-Queens of the Stone Age (and later Peter Murphy) drummer Nick Lucero completed the line-up.

Raven died of a heart attack in his sleep on 20 October 2007 in Geneva, Switzerland, where he was recording with Treponem Pal vocalist Marco Neves.

== Discography ==
Year	Act	Album
1979	Neon Hearts	Popular Music
1982	Kitsch	—
1982	Killing Joke	—
1983	Killing Joke	Fire Dances
1984	Killing Joke	—
1985	Killing Joke	Night Time
1986	Killing Joke	Brighter than a Thousand Suns
1987–89	Killing Joke	—
1990	Killing Joke	Extremities, Dirt & Various Repressed Emotions
1990	Pigface	Lean Juicy Pork
1991	Pigface	Welcome to Mexico... Asshole
1991	Murder, Inc.	—
1992	Murder, Inc.	Corpuscle EP
1992	Murder, Inc.	Murder, Inc.
1992	Pigface	Fook
1994	Prong	Cleansing
1995	Raggadeath	The Family Worship EP
1995	Raggadeath	Why Ask Why
1996	Prong	Rude Awakening
1996	Zilch	—
1997	Zilch	—
1998	Zilch	3.2.1.
1999–2000		—
2001	Econoline Crush	Brand New History
2002	Godflesh (Note: Godflesh disbanded in 2002 when Broadrick suffered a nervous breakdown just before departing for a tour of the U.S. Raven had been hired as a sideman, and accompanist during the two-month tour.)	—
2003	Society 1	Exit Through Fear
2003	Killing Joke	Killing Joke
2005	Ministry	—
2006	Killing Joke	Hosannas from the Basements of Hell
2006	Ministry	Rio Grande Blood
2006	Treponem Pal	—
2007	16volt	FullBlackHabit
2007	Ministry	The Last Sucker
2008	Treponem Pal	Weird Machine
2009	Mob Research	Holy City Zoo

== Bibliography ==
Further reading:

- Hämäläinen, Jyrki "Spider" (2020). Killing Joke: Are You Receiving?. Milton Keynes: New Haven Publishing Ltd. ISBN 978-1912587407.
