= Force Fed =

Studio album by Prong
- Released: March 1988
- Recorded: January – July 1987
- Studios: Baby Monster, New York City
- Genre: Crossover thrash
- Length: 29:15
- Labels: Spigot, In-Effect
- Producer: Prong

Prong chronology
Primitive Origins (1987)	Force Fed (1988)	Beg to Differ (1990)

Professional ratings
Review scores
Source	Rating
AllMusic	4/5 stars

Force Fed is the debut album by the American band Prong, initially released only in Europe in 1988 by Spigot Records. It was recorded around the same time as their 1987 mini-album Primitive Origins, and was not released in the United States until 1989 through In-Effect/Relativity Records, whose parent company Epic Records subsequently signed the band. Drummer Ted Parsons co-wrote some songs with Prong for the first time on this album.

The song "Bought and Sold" was not included on the original vinyl release, and is omitted from some CD versions of the album, including the reissue. Instead, certain CD versions include two bonus tracks: "Mind the Gap" and a cover of Chrome's "Third from the Sun". They were both originally taken from Prong's 1989 single "Third from the Sun" (also known as 3). "Third from the Sun" was a minor success in the UK, as it peaked at No. 5 on the UK Independent Singles Chart, and thus it became a staple of Prong's live shows afterwards.

== Track listing ==
1. "Freezer Burn" – 2:33 (Tommy Victor)
2. "Forgery" – 1:52 (Mike Kirkland)
3. "Senseless Abuse" – 3:18 (Victor, Ted Parsons)
4. "Primitive Origins" – 3:23 (Victor)
5. "Aggravated Condition" – 2:52 (Victor)
6. "The Coliseum" – 2:33 (Victor, Parsons)
7. "Decay" – 2:44 (Victor, Kirkland)
8. "It's Been Decided" – 2:18 (Kirkland)
9. "Force Fed" – 2:48 (Victor, Kirkland, Parsons)
10. "The Taming" – 1:47 (Kirkland, Curtis James)
11. "Bought and Sold" – 3:16 (Victor, Kirkland)
12. "Look Up at the Sun" – 3:07 (Victor, Kirkland, Parsons)
13. "Drainpipe" – 2:20 (Victor)
14. "Third from the Sun" (bonus CD re-issue track; Chrome cover)
15. "Mind the Gap" (bonus CD re-issue track) (Kirkland)

== Personnel ==
- Tommy Victor – guitars, vocals
- Mike Kirkland – bass
- Ted Parsons – drums
