= Power of the Damager =

Studio album by Prong
- Released: October 2, 2007
- Recorded: Sonic Ranch, Tornillo, Texas, U.S.
- Genre: Thrash metal, groove metal
- Length: 45:06
- Label: 13th Planet
- Producer: Tommy Victor, Monte Pittman

Prong chronology
Scorpio Rising (2003)	Power of the Damager (2007)	Power of the Damn Mixxxer (2009)

Professional ratings
Review scores
Source	Rating
AllMusic	3.5/5 stars
Collector's Guide to Heavy Metal	8/10
Stylus	B+

Power of the Damager is the seventh studio album by American metal band Prong. It was released through 13th Planet Records on October 2, 2007. The album peaked at No. 47 on the Billboard Top Heatseekers chart.

== Track listing ==
All tracks are written by Tommy Victor, except where noted.

No.	Title	Music	Length
1.	"Looking for Them"		3:37
2.	"No Justice"		3:56
3.	"3rd Option"	Victor, Monte Pittman	4:07
4.	"Pure Ether"		3:50
5.	"Power of the Damager"		3:39
6.	"The Banishment"	Victor, Pittman	5:57
7.	"Worst of It"	Victor, Pittman	3:32
8.	"Spirit Guide"		3:40
9.	"Messages Inside of Me"		2:54
10.	"Can't Stop the Bleeding"	Victor, Pittman	2:55
11.	"Bad Fall"		3:55
12.	"Changing Ending Troubling Times"	Victor, Pittman	6:24
13.	"Idealistic Types" (Japan bonus track)		3:24
Total length:			45:06

== Personnel ==
- Tommy Victor – guitar, vocals, producer
- Monte Pittman – bass guitar, backing vocals, additional lead guitar (track 12), associate producer
- Aaron Rossi – drums
- Al Jourgensen – keyboards and mixing (track 6)
- Gil Elguezabal, Marco A. Ramirez – audio engineers
- John Bilberry – mix engineer
- Charles Godfrey – assistant engineer
- Lawton Outlaw – artwork
- Allan Amato – photography

== Charts ==
Chart (2007)	Position
US Top Heatseekers	47
