= Cleansing (album) =

Studio album by Prong
- Released: January 25, 1994
- Recorded: 1993
- Genres: Groove metal; alternative metal; industrial metal
- Length: 58:02
- Label: Epic
- Producers: Terry Date; Prong

Prong chronology
Whose Fist Is This Anyway? (1992)	Cleansing (1994)	Rude Awakening (1996)

Singles from Prong
- 1. "Snap Your Fingers, Snap Your Neck" Released: January 10, 1994; 2. "Whose Fist Is This Anyway?" Released: 1994; 3. "Broken Peace" Released: 1994

Cleansing is the fourth album by the American heavy metal band Prong, released on January 25, 1994, by Epic Records. It was produced by Terry Date, whereas Prong's previous two albums had been produced by Mark Dodson. The album features ex-Killing Joke members Paul Raven on bass guitar and John Bechdel on keyboards and programming. Featuring an industrial-influenced sound, the record received moderate commercial success.

The single "Snap Your Fingers, Snap Your Neck" received commercial interest; its music video received heavy rotation on MTV and was featured on an episode of Beavis and Butt-Head. As a part of the album's promotion, the band toured with Sepultura and Pantera as an opener for their Chaos A.D. and Far Beyond Driven tours, respectively.

The record was reissued by SPV/Steamhammer in 2008.

== Background and style ==
Prong's vocalist and guitarist Tommy Victor has stated that the record was largely written in the bathroom of his Williamsburg apartment on an acoustic guitar at night. Despite the label's opposition, the band chose Terry Date as the producer, recording the tracks at Bad Animals and Magic Shop recording studios. The album was mixed at Electric Lady Studios.

Compared to band's New York hardcore-infused 1980s work, Cleansing incorporates Pantera-influenced guitar grooves and industrial metal sounds; the album's style was also described as alternative metal. According to Victor, the band "really went in the direction of anything that wasn't thrash metal, because we were sick of the whole thing," with The Sisters of Mercy's 1990 album Vision Thing being an influence on the record.

== Critical reception ==
Professional ratings
Review scores
Source	Rating
AllMusic	4.5/5 stars
Collector's Guide to Heavy Metal	8/10
The Encyclopedia of Popular Music	3/5 stars
Kerrang!	5/5 stars
MusicHound Rock	3/5 stars
Ox-Fanzine	5/5 stars
Record Collector	3/5 stars
Record-Journal	A+
Rock Hard	9/10

AllMusic critic Stephen Thomas Erlewine described the record as "the band's most varied and best record yet," remarking that the record "tightens up their trademark drilling guitars while adding some slight techno and industrial touches." Erlewine further noted that the new elements "heightens the tension" but also "strengthens their already muscular metallic roar." Record Collector's Joel McIver described the record as "a respectable seller rather than a monster" and wrote: "although the album sounds great to this day, all slablike, noisegated riffs and pulsating beats, it wasn't to be." McIver also compared the staccato guitar sound to the more commercial works of Fear Factory.

Jason Roche of The Village Voice included Cleansing on his list of Top 20 New York Hardcore and Metals Albums, saying that it "proved to be as catchy as it was heavy". Tommy Victor has ranked it as the second best Prong album.

== Track listing ==
All tracks are written by Prong.

No.	Title	Length
1.	"Another Worldly Device"	3:23
2.	"Whose Fist Is This Anyway?"	4:42
3.	"Snap Your Fingers, Snap Your Neck"	4:11
4.	"Cut-Rate"	4:52
5.	"Broken Peace"	6:11
6.	"One Outnumbered"	4:58
7.	"Out of This Misery"	4:25
8.	"No Question"	4:17
9.	"Not of This Earth"	6:25
10.	"Home Rule"	3:57
11.	"Sublime"	3:53
12.	"Test"	6:40
Total length:		58:02

Limited edition bonus tracks
No.	Title	Length
13.	"Corpus Delicti"	3:33
14.	"No Souls Rising"	3:50
15.	"Snap Your Fingers, Snap Your Neck" (live)	4:32

== Personnel ==
Album credits as adapted from the liner notes.

Prong

- Tommy Victor — vocals, guitar
- Paul Raven — bass guitar
- Ted Parsons — drums
- John Bechdel — keyboards, programming

Technical credits

- Terry Date — producer, engineer
- Prong — producer
- Ted Jensen — mastering

== Chart positions ==
Chart (1994)	Peak position
Billboard 200	126

== Cover versions ==
"Snap Your Fingers, Snap Your Neck" has been covered by several artists:

- Dry Kill Logic on their Rot EP, which was only available from Roadrunner Records metal radio mail list
- Demon Hunter on their album, The Triptych
- Six Feet Under on their third cover album Graveyard Classics 3
- Grinspoon on their EP Pushing Buttons
- Black Tusk and Child Bite, who released their collaboration as a music video
- Soil on their cover album Play It Forward
