= Prong (band) =

American heavy metal band

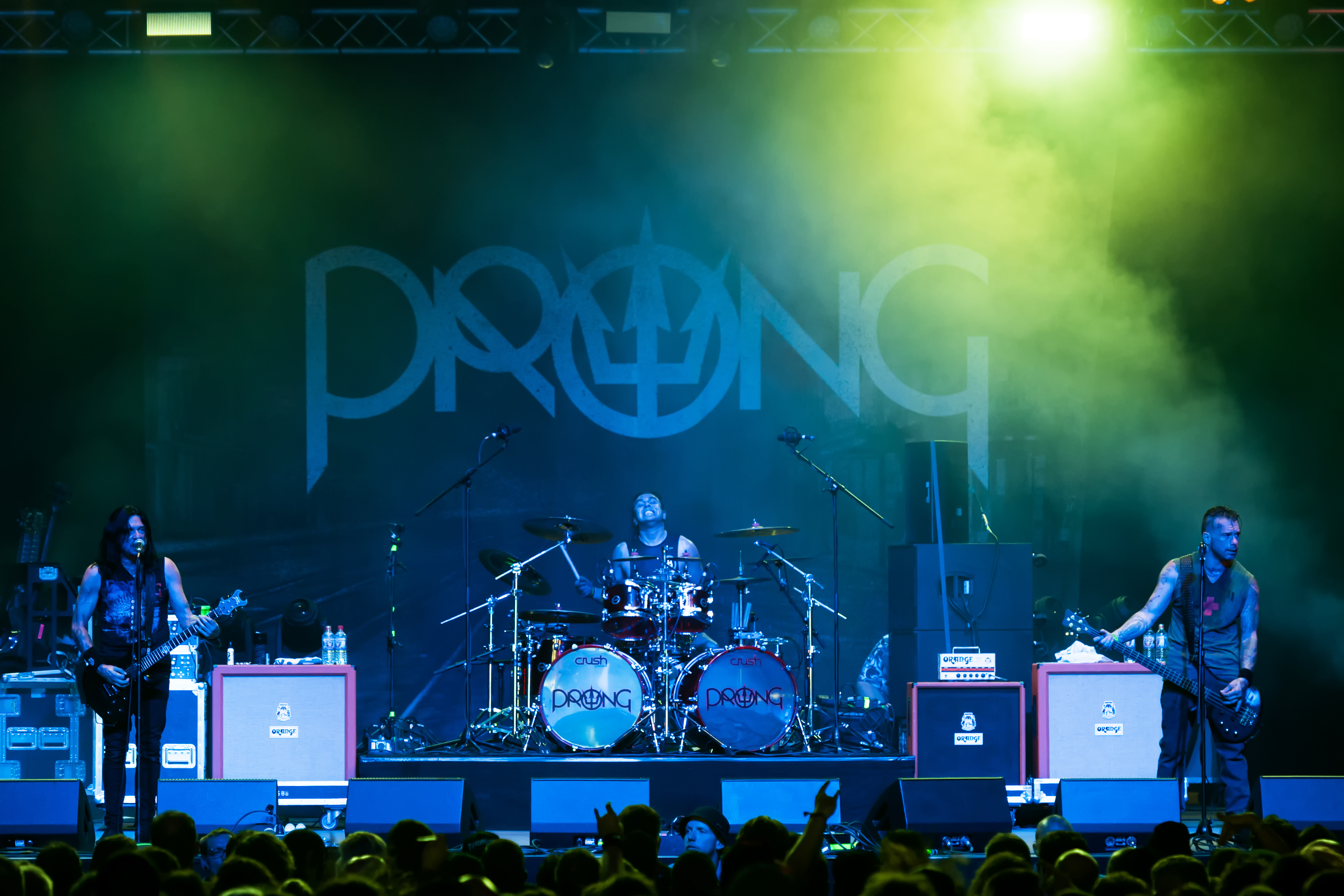
- Prong performing at Wacken Open Air 2017

Background information
- Origin: New York City, U.S.
- Genres: Groove metal; thrash metal; alternative metal; industrial metal; crossover thrash (early)
- Works: Discography
- Years active: 1986–1997; 2002–present
- Labels: Epic; Locomotive; 13th Planet; SPV
- Members: Tommy Victor; Christopher Dean; Tyler Bogliole
- Past members: Jason Christopher; Ted Parsons; Paul Raven; John Bechdel; John Tempesta; Sterling Flournoy; Troy Gregory; Rob "Blasko" Nicholson; Frank Cavanagh; Dan Laudo; Brian Perry; Mike Kirkland; Mike Riggs; Monte Pittman; Mike Longworth; Tony Campos; Alexei Rodriguez; Matt Celmer; Art Cruz; Griffin McCarthy
- Website: prongmusic.com

Prong is an American heavy metal band formed in New York City in 1986. The band is fronted by guitarist/vocalist Tommy Victor, Prong's sole constant member. The band was originally composed of Victor, bassist Mike Kirkland, and drummer Ted Parsons. Their first two studio releases, the mini-album Primitive Origins (1987) and full-length album Force Fed (1988), were released independently and leaned into the crossover thrash genre. The trio signed with Epic Records in 1989, and their first major label release, the following year's Beg to Differ, was a minor success as it received regular exposure on MTV's Headbangers Ball. The album transitioned the band into a groove metal sound.

Bassist Troy Gregory replaced Kirkland for 1991's Prove You Wrong, which was Prong's first album to appear on a Billboard chart as it peaked at No. 34 on the Heatseekers Albums chart. The lead single, "Prove You Wrong", peaked at No. 58 on UK Singles chart, the band's highest position on that chart. Gregory was soon replaced by bassist Paul Raven. The band's lineup expanded to four members for the first time with the addition of keyboardist John Bechdel for 1994's Cleansing. The album marked a change of direction towards a more industrial sound, being regarded as Prong's "most varied record". Cleansing peaked at No. 126 on the Billboard 200 chart and the single "Snap Your Fingers, Snap Your Neck" became one of Prong's most prominent songs. After the departure of Bechdel, Prong would release 1996's Rude Awakening. Despite reaching moderate positions on the charts, the decreased commercial performance of Rude Awakening prompted Epic to drop the band, which led to their disbandment.

After a five-year hiatus, Prong was reformed in early 2002 with a new lineup and tour. Victor was the only former member to return, and the band has revolved around him since then. Prong subsequently signed to Locomotive Music to release 2003's Scorpio Rising. In 2007, the band released Power of the Damager through 13th Planet Records. In 2012, the band switched to SPV Records and released Carved into Stone that same year, followed by Ruining Lives (2014) and the cover album Songs from the Black Hole (2015). Three more albums followed, again on SPV: 2016's X – No Absolutes (which gave Prong their highest position on the Heatseekers Albums chart in over two decades at No. 7), 2017's Zero Days, and 2023's State of Emergency. The band then signed to Napalm Records for the 2026 album Prong.

== History ==
=== Early days (1986–1988) ===
The band was founded in 1986 on the Lower East Side by singer/guitarist Tommy Victor (then a sound engineer for the New York City music club CBGB) and bassist Mike Kirkland (doorman at CBGB), who recruited ex-Swans drummer Ted Parsons shortly after. Prong independently released an EP, Primitive Origins (1987), and a studio album, Force Fed (1988), both of which were noted for their very raw sound.

=== Major label signing and underground success (1989–1995) ===
Prong signed with Epic Records in 1989. Their major label debut album, Beg to Differ, was released in 1990.

In the following year, Kirkland left the band and was replaced by bassist Troy Gregory. Prong issued their fourth release, Prove You Wrong, which saw the band experiment with programming and electronic samples while still retaining an aggressive yet melodic sensibility.

By 1993, Troy Gregory was out of the band and was replaced by Paul Raven and John Bechdel, both from Killing Joke and Murder, Inc. The new line-up released Cleansing (Prong's fifth major release) in 1994. With a slight industrial metal influence, Cleansing contained songs that are still considered Prong classics ("Broken Peace" and "Snap Your Fingers, Snap Your Neck") and is Prong's most successful release to date. The videos for these two songs became staples of MTV's Headbangers Ball. The band toured America with Sepultura and Pantera as an opener for their respective Chaos A.D. and Far Beyond Driven tours. They also undertook a headlining European tour with Life of Agony and The Obsessed as their support.

=== Demise (1996–2002) ===
Prong's 5th album Rude Awakening was released in 1996. It entered the charts at No. 107 and sold 10,000 units in the United States in its first week. Despite the good sales, Epic Records released the band from their contract three weeks after the album's release. Shortly thereafter, Raven left prior to a tour supporting Type O Negative and was replaced by Rob "Blasko" Nicholson. Mike Riggs later joined on guitar so Victor could focus more on vocals. This line-up later disbanded, with Victor joining Danzig as their guitar player, and Ted Parsons joining Godflesh. Parsons also played with Jesu and toured with Paul Raven in Killing Joke.

=== Interim (2002–2006) ===
In 2002, Victor reformed Prong with bassist Brian Perry (Dirty Looks, Jake E. Lee), drummer Dan Laudo and guitarist Monte Pittman (Madonna). In 2002, after a 42-date American tour that was recorded for a live CD (100% Live, Locomotive Music) Prong entered the studio and recorded their first studio album in seven years, Scorpio Rising (2003), which was received with mixed responses.

Victor played on and off again with Glenn Danzig from 1998 to 2005 in between time with Prong. His final goal of playing and writing on a Danzig record was met with Circle of Snakes in 2004.

Prong released a live two-disc DVD in 2005 entitled The Vault which features performances from the Hulstsfred and With Full Force festivals and a full show in Amsterdam. This disc has Brian Perry and Mike Longworth on bass as Longworth replaced Perry after his departure in 2003. Dan Laudo left the band in 2005 and the band enlisted Aaron Rossi, who used to be in the bands Strife (Victory Records), Shelter (Century Media Records), John 5 (Shrapnel Records), and Ankla (Bieler Bros. Records)

Victor and Rossi joined Ministry in 2005 to write and tour in support of their 2006 album Rio Grande Blood. The two also appear on Ministry's follow-up album The Last Sucker (2007), although in a more limited capacity.

=== Reformation (2007–present) ===
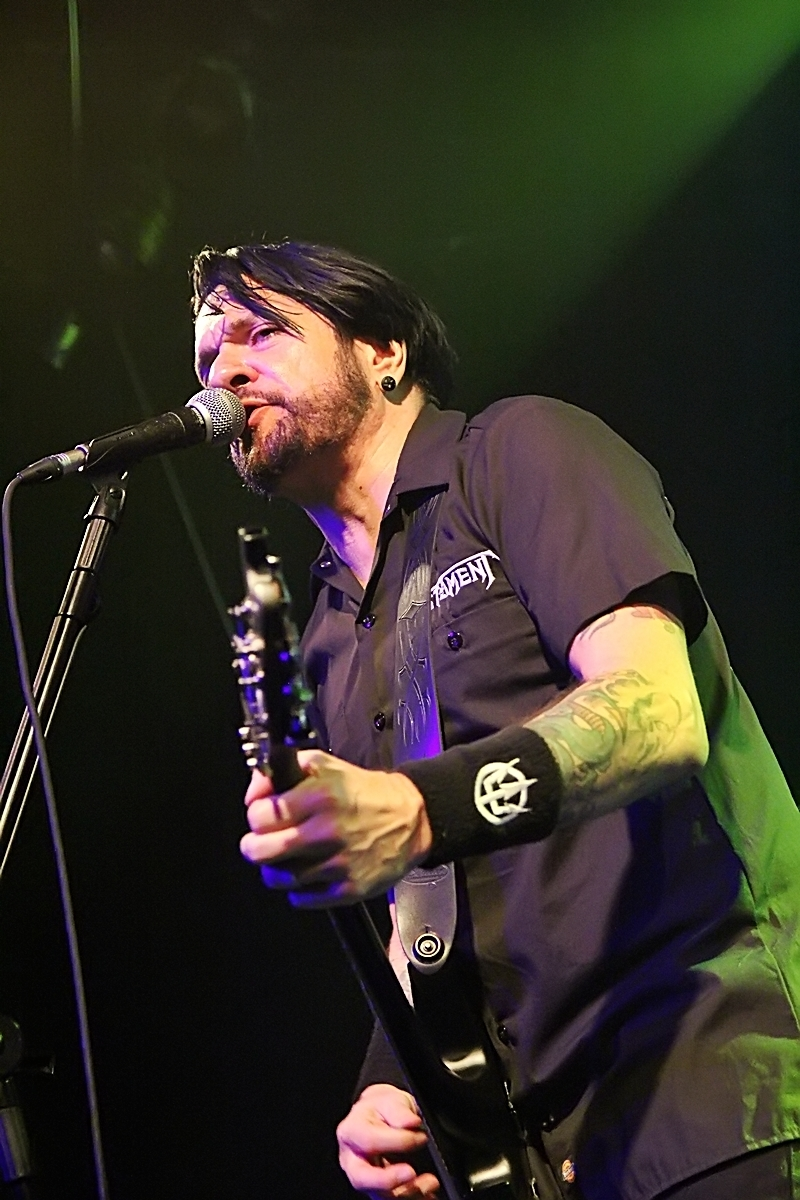
Frontman Tommy Victor performing in 2020

In 2007, Prong signed to Al Jourgensen's 13th Planet Records, who released Power of the Damager on October 2, 2007. The band embarked on the "Slicing Across America" and "Slicing Across Europe" tours supporting the album in 2007 and early 2008. Joining Tommy Victor for the tour were Monte Pittman and drummer Aaron Rossi; bassist Paul Raven had died of a heart attack in his sleep on October 20, 2007, at the age of 46.

Rossi joined Ministry as their new drummer on the "C U LaTour" which started in March 2008.

Alexei Rodriguez and Tony Campos from Static-X were on the lineup with Tommy supporting Soulfly on the "Blood Fire War Hate" tour in the fall of 2009. They were replaced by Jason Christopher (bass) in 2011 and Art Cruz (drums) in 2012.

The band supported Fear Factory on their tour which ended on June 6, 2010. Prong released a new album, Carved into Stone, on April 23, 2012, with Long Branch Records/SPV. It was produced by Steve Evetts. The band toured as a headliner and with acts such as Crowbar in the US, and in May 2012 performed Beg to Differ in its entirety during a two-week tour in Europe.

In the summer of 2013, the band performed an extensive European festival and headline run and also recorded a self-released "Official Bootleg" entitled Unleashed in the West – Live in Berlin via Bandcamp.com.

After spending November and December 2013 in the studio, Prong released their ninth album, Ruining Lives, on Steamhammer/SPV in April 2014 and toured extensively in its support. Blabbermouth.net called the album "Tommy Victor's personal liberation." The album was produced by Victor and mixed by Steve Evetts.

The band started a second wave of touring behind Ruining Lives in July 2014, with European festivals and headline shows. They also toured in North America, both as headliners and as support to Overkill, followed by a tour in Europe as main support to Overkill in October and November.

In 2015, the band released the cover album Songs from the Black Hole, followed a year later by their eleventh studio album X – No Absolutes. Another album, Zero Days, was released in 2017. In 2017, at the beginning of August, they played a concert in Polish Woodstock Festival. Prong's next release was the EP Age of Defiance, released on November 29, 2019.

The band's thirteenth studio album, State of Emergency, was released on October 6, 2023. A live album, Live and Uncleansed, was released on March 6, 2026. Their self-titled fourteenth studio album was released on November 6, 2026.

== Musical style, influences and legacy ==
Prong has been described as groove metal, industrial metal, and thrash metal, while their early work has been characterized as crossover thrash. Emerging from the New York hardcore scene, they, along with bands such as Pantera, Sepultura and Machine Head, are one of the bands of the groove metal movement of the 1990s. Prong has cited several bands as influences, including Rush, Bad Brains, Killing Joke, Discharge, Celtic Frost, Voivod, Kreator, Destruction, Metallica, Warzone, the Cro-Mags, Die Kreuzen, and the Sisters of Mercy.

They have influenced many notable musicians such as Korn's Jonathan Davis, Demon Hunter's Ryan Clark and Nine Inch Nails' Trent Reznor, as well as bands such as Pantera and White Zombie.

== Members ==
=== Current members ===
Image	Name	Years active	Instruments	Release contributions
	Tommy Victor	1986–1997; 2002–present	guitars; lead vocals	all releases
	Christopher Dean	2023–present	bass; backing vocals	Live and Uncleansed (2026); Prong (2026)
	Tyler Bogliole	2023–present	drums	Live and Uncleansed (2026); Prong (2026)

=== Former members ===
Image	Name	Years active	Instruments	Release contributions
	Ted Parsons	1986–1997	drums; backing vocals	all releases from Primitive Origins (1987) to Rude Awakening (1996)
	Mike Kirkland	1986–1991	bass; backing vocals	all releases from Primitive Origins (1987) to Live at CBGB's (1990)
	Troy Gregory	1991–1993	bass; backing vocals	Prove You Wrong (1991); Whose Fist Is This Anyway? (1992)
	Paul Raven	1993–1996 (died 2007)	bass	Whose Fist Is This Anyway? (1992); Snap Your Fingers, Break Your Back (1993); Cleansing (1994); Rude Awakening (1996)
	John Bechdel	1993–1995	keyboards; programming	Snap Your Fingers, Break Your Back (1993); Cleansing (1994); Power of the Damn Mixxxer (2009)
	Mike Riggs	1996–1997	rhythm guitar	none
	Rob "Blasko" Nicholson	1996	bass	none
	Frank Cavanagh	1997	bass	none
	John Tempesta	1997	drums	none
	Dan Laudo	2002–2005	drums	100% Live (2002); Scorpio Rising (2003); The Vault (2005)
	Brian Perry	2002–2003	bass	100% Live (2002); The Vault (2005)
	Monte Pittman	2002–2009	rhythm guitar (2002–2006); bass (2006–2009); backing vocals	all releases from 100% Live (2002) to Power of the Damn Mixxxer (2009)
	Mike Longworth	2003–2006 (touring only); 2016–2017	bass; backing vocals	Carved into Stone (2012); Zero Days (2017)
	Aaron Rossi	2005–2009; 2018–2021 (died 2025)	drums	Power of the Damager (2007); Power of the Damn Mixxxer (2009)
	Tony Campos	2009–2012	bass; backing vocals	Carved into Stone (2012)
	Alexei Rodriguez	2009–2014	drums; backing vocals	Carved into Stone (2012); Unleashed in the West: Live in Berlin (2014); Ruining Lives (2014)
	Art Cruz	2014–2018	drums	Songs from the Black Hole (2015); X – No Absolutes (2016); Zero Days (2017); Age of Defiance (2019)
	Griffin McCarthy	2022–2023	drums	State of Emergency (2023)
	Jason Christopher	2012–2016; 2017–2023	bass; backing vocals	Unleashed in the West: Live in Berlin (2014); Ruining Lives (2014); Songs from the Black Hole (2015); X – No Absolutes (2016); Age of Defiance (2019); State of Emergency (2023)

=== Live musicians ===
Image	Name	Years active	Instruments	Notes
	Joseph Bishara	1994	keyboards	Bishara briefly toured with the band.
	Vince Dennis	1996	bass	Dennis covered for Paul Raven when the bassist injured himself.
	Matthew Brunson	2012	bass	Brunson and Pybus covered for Tony Campos who was touring with Soulfly.
	Dave Pybus	2012	bass	Brunson and Pybus covered for Tony Campos who was touring with Soulfly.
	Fred Ziomek	2019–2020	bass; backing vocals	Ziomek toured with the band in 2019 and 2020.
	Jason Bittner	2023 (European tour)	drums	Bittner covered for Griffin McCarthy who had other commitments in 2023.

== Discography ==
- Primitive Origins (1987) (Note: Released as a studio mini-album.)
- Force Fed (1988)
- Beg to Differ (1990)
- Prove You Wrong (1991)
- Cleansing (1994)
- Rude Awakening (1996)
- Scorpio Rising (2003)
- Power of the Damager (2007)
- Carved into Stone (2012)
- Ruining Lives (2014)
- Songs from the Black Hole (2015) (Note: Released as a studio cover album.)
- X – No Absolutes (2016)
- Zero Days (2017)
- State of Emergency (2023)
- Prong (2026)
