= Ted Parsons =

American drummer

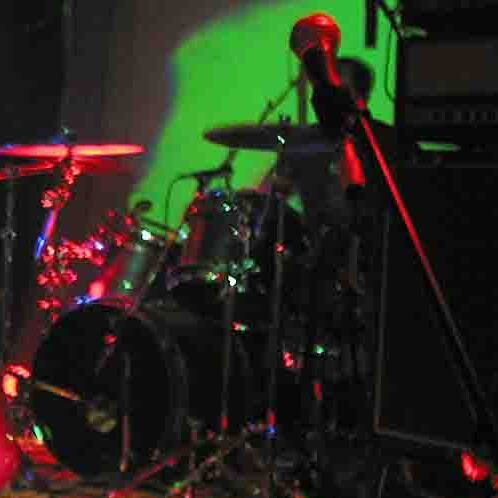
- Parsons with Jesu in 2005

Background information
- Genres: Experimental rock; industrial; post-punk; heavy metal
- Occupation: Drummer
- Years active: 1985–present
- Website: tedparsons.net

Ted Parsons is an American drummer most notable for his membership in rock/metal bands such as Swans, Prong, Godflesh, Killing Joke, and Jesu.

== Biography ==
Parsons' early career began in 1985 with Swans, when he contributed to their Holy Money album. He left Swans in 1987 and joined guitarist Tommy Victor's fledgling Prong. In 1994, he appeared on Buckethead's album Giant Robot. Prong would be Parsons' main project until the group disbanded in 1996. He then started a long-standing friendship with UK composer Justin Broadrick, playing on Godflesh's 1996 tour and their album Hymns. Parsons has also played in Of Cabbages and Kings with former Swans bandmate Algis Kizys and was a one-time member of Foetus touring band.

Over the years, Parsons has also recorded with members of Public Image Ltd. (in 2007, Keith Levene released an album with Parsons' band Necessary Intergalactic Cooperation), Killing Joke and Gator Bait Ten, a project by Science Slam Sonic Explorers, some of whom appear on his recent NIC remix project album. Youth of Killing Joke contributed a remix based on a Glen Brown/Sylford Walker dub tune.

Parsons is a frequent member of Justin Broadrick's Jesu project, and has his own dub group, Teledubgnosis. In 2024, he toured and recorded with "This Celestial Engine".

== Bibliography ==
Further reading:

- Hämäläinen, Jyrki "Spider" (2020). Killing Joke: Are You Receiving?. Milton Keynes: New Haven Publishing Ltd. ISBN 978-1-912587-40-7.
