= Tommy Victor =

American musician

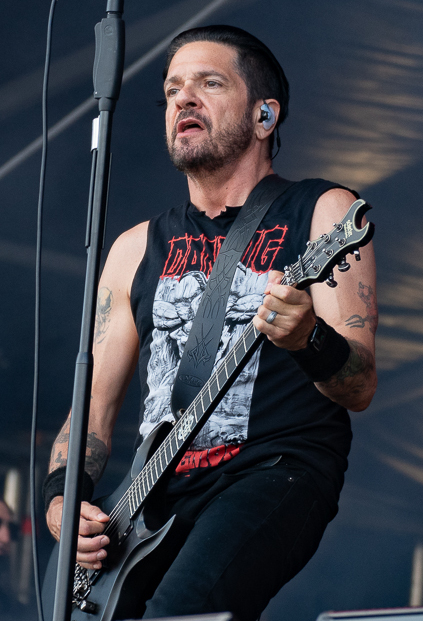
- Victor performing with Prong in 2025

Background information
- Born: Thomas Michael Victor; September 20, 1961 or 1962 (age 64–65); New York City, U.S.
- Genres: Groove metal, thrash metal, industrial metal, alternative metal, crossover thrash (early)
- Occupations: Musician, singer, songwriter, record producer
- Instruments: Guitar, vocals
- Years active: 1984–present
- Member of: Prong, Danzig
- Formerly of: Ministry, Tapeworm

Thomas Michael Victor (born September 20, 1961/1962) is an American guitarist, singer, songwriter, and producer. He is best known as the frontman of heavy metal band Prong, which he founded in New York City in 1986, and as the guitarist for heavy metal band Danzig intermittently since 1996 and full-time since 2008. He is also a former member of Ministry.

== Biography ==
In the second half of the 1980s, Victor worked as a sound engineer at the music club CBGB in New York City. After the release of Rude Awakening in 1996, Prong disbanded and Victor moved to Los Angeles, but later revived the band to release new Prong records. He took a break from Prong during which he worked alongside rock musicians including Rob Zombie, Marilyn Manson, Trent Reznor, and Glenn Danzig.

With 2012's Carved into Stone, Prong became active again, releasing albums and touring regularly. The next studio album, Ruining Lives, was released in 2014. in 2015, the band released a covers album, Songs from the Black Hole.

Victor is also part of the hard rock supergroup Teenage Time Killers.

Victor has toured and recorded with Ministry and Danzig. He also sang on one track on the Soulfly album Omen. He contributed to the Argyle Park album Misguided, and wrote the main riff for the song "Doomsayer", which he later used on the Prong song "Controller".

== Influences and equipment ==
Victor has cited numerous bands as influences, including Die Kreuzen, Killing Joke, Bauhaus, Black Flag, Bad Brains, Parliament-Funkadelic, Yes, Jethro Tull, Deep Purple, Destruction, Celtic Frost, Slayer, Metallica, Black Sabbath, Led Zeppelin, the Stooges, Sex Pistols, Motörhead, Neil Young, Fugazi, Minor Threat, and Adolescents.

Victor has been endorsed by Schecter Guitar Research ever since reuniting with Prong, using both an S-1 and C-1 in early live performances. He later used their Devil guitar, which became the basis for his second signature model. In 2013, his first signature model was released, based on the newly introduced Banshee series; in 2015, his second signature model was introduced, based on the Devil series guitar.

== Discography ==
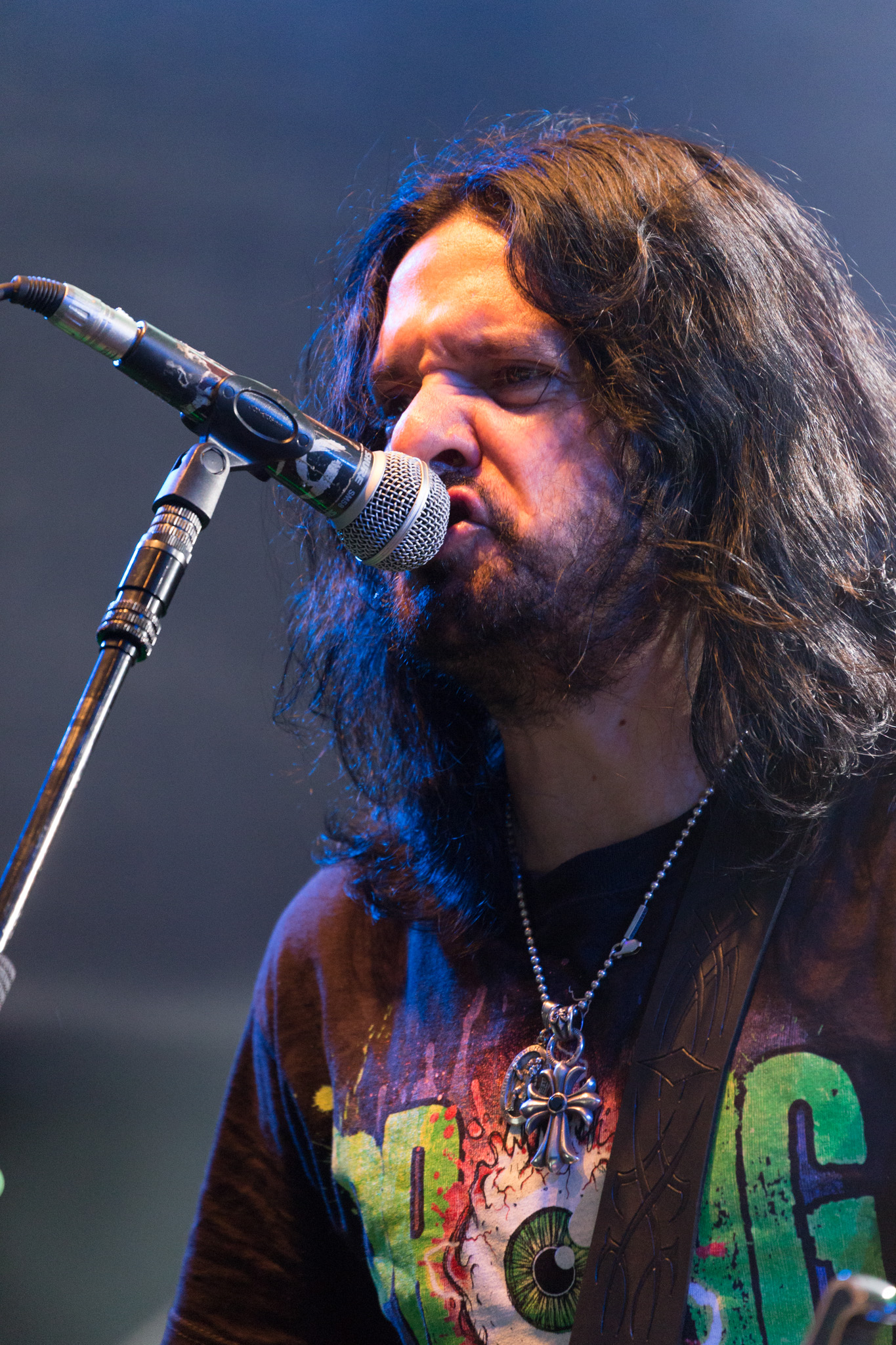
Victor with Prong in Germany, 2014

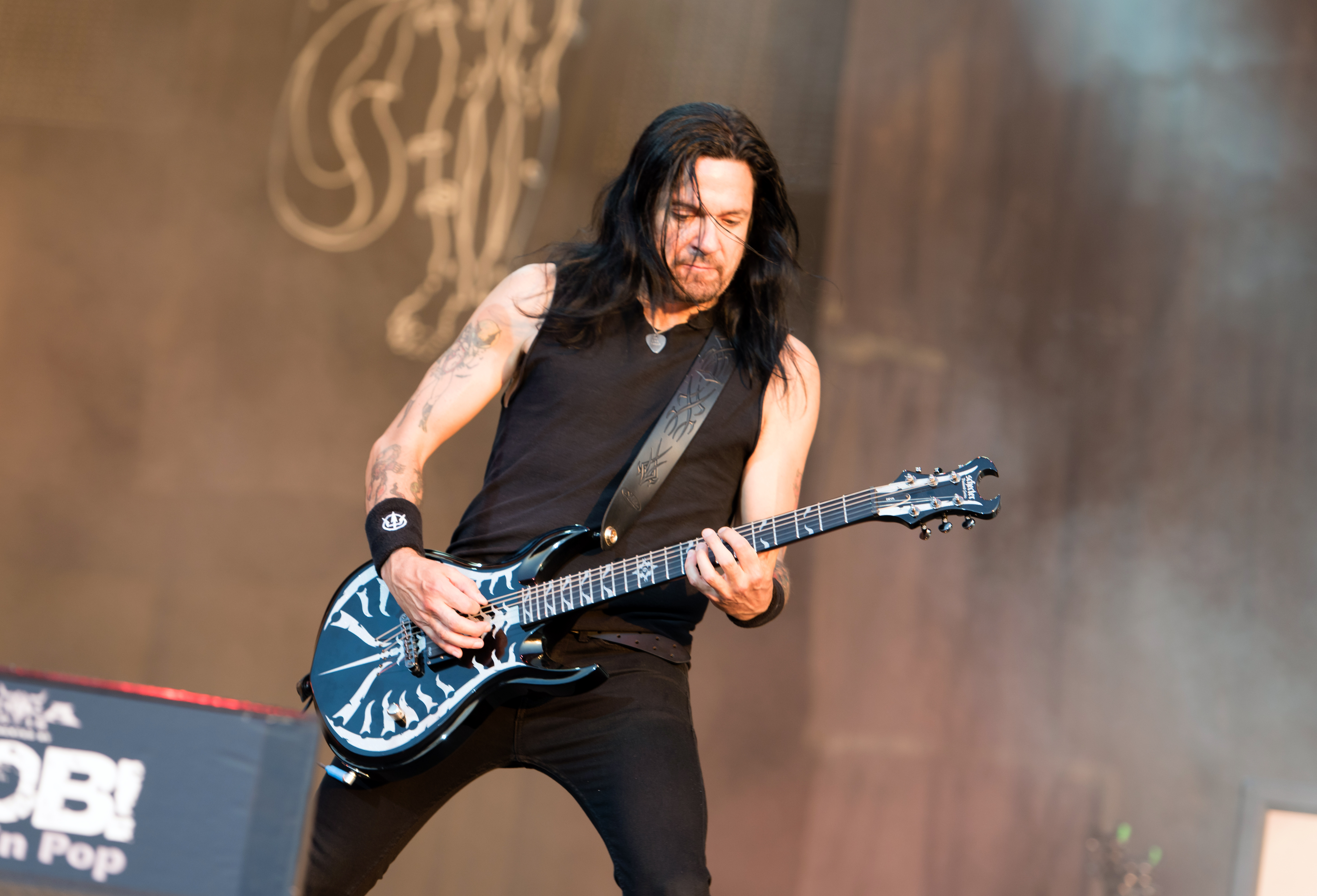
Victor with Danzig at Wacken Open Air 2018

=== Prong ===
- Force Fed (1988)
- Beg to Differ (1990)
- Prove You Wrong (1991)
- Cleansing (1994)
- Rude Awakening (1996)
- Scorpio Rising (2003)
- Power of the Damager (2007)
- Carved into Stone (2012)
- Ruining Lives (2014)
- Songs from the Black Hole (2015)
- X – No Absolutes (2016)
- Zero Days (2017)
- State of Emergency (2023)

=== Danzig ===
- Circle of Snakes (2004)
- Deth Red Sabaoth (2010)
- Skeletons (2015)
- Black Laden Crown (2017)
- Danzig Sings Elvis (2020)

=== Ministry ===
- Rio Grande Blood (2006)
- The Last Sucker (2007)
- Relapse (2012)
