= Pigface discography =

This is the discography page of industrial rock supergroup Pigface.

== Studio albums ==
- Gub (1991)
- Fook (1992)
- Notes From Thee Underground (1994)
- A New High in Low (1997)
- Easy Listening... (2003)
- 6 (2009)

== Remix albums ==
- Washingmachine Mouth (1993)
- Feels Like Heaven (1995)
- Below the Belt (1998)
- Headfuck (2003)
- Dubhead (2004)
- Clubhead Nonstopmegamix #1 (2004)
- Crackhead: The DJ? Acucrack Remix Album (2004)
- 8 Bit Head (2004)
- 17 Ways To Suck (2008)

== Live albums ==
- Lean Juicy Pork (1990; Interview)
- Welcome to Mexico... Asshole (1991)
- Truth Will Out (1993)
- Eat Shit You Fucking Redneck (1998)
- Pigface Live 2019 (2020)

== Compilations ==
- The Best of Pigface: Preaching to the Perverted (2001)
- Pigface Vs. The World (2005)
- The Head Remixes (2006; Box set)

== Singles and EPs ==
- Spoon Breakfast EP (1990)
- Empathy/Steamroller 7" Single (1993)
- "Broadcast from Radio China" (Pigface) / "Close Your Cold Eyes" (Snapline) (2006)

== Video albums ==
- Glitch (1993; Invisible)
- Son of Glitch (1996; Invisible)
- 90-96 (2003; Underground Inc.)
- United I Tour 03 (2003; Live; Underground Inc.)
- Free for All (2008; Audiovisual)
- Glitch/Son of a Glitch (2008; Audiovisual)
- The Beijing Tapes: Part 1 (2009)

== Tribute and cover albums ==
- From Russia with Love: A Russian Tribute to Pigface (2001; Various artists)
