= Pigface vs. the World =

Pigface Vs. The World

Compilation album by Pigface
- Released: March 28, 2005
- Genre: Industrial
- Length: 262:00
- Label: Eastwood

Pigface chronology
| 8 Bit Head: Complete Remix of Easy Listening + Other Stuff (2004) | Pigface Vs. The World (2005) | Free for All Tour Demo (2005) |

Professional ratings
Review scores
| Source | Rating |
|---|---|
| Allmusic | 4/5 stars |

A compendium of previous efforts released on a four disk set.

== Track listing ==
Disc 1
| No. | Title | From Album | Length |
|---|---|---|---|
| 1. | "Point Blank" | Gub |
| 2. | "Auto Hag" | Fook |
| 3. | "Suck" | Gub |
| 4. | "Alles Ist Mine" | Fook |
| 5. | "The Bushmaster" | Gub |
| 6. | "Tapeworm" | Gub |
| 7. | "Divebomber" | Notes From Thee Underground |
| 8. | "Go!" | Fook |
| 9. | "Little Sisters" | Gub |
| 10. | "War Ich Nicht Immer Ein Guter Junge? War Ich Nicht Immer Schoen Und Nett? Ich Zerpfluckte Niemals Eine Spinne" | Gub |
| 11. | "I Can Do No Wrong" | Fook |
| 12. | "Hips, Tits, Lips, Power!" | Fook |
| 13. | "Insemination" | Fook |
| 14. | "Satellite – Needle In The Groove (No Damage Done)" | Washingmachine Mouth |

Disc 2
| No. | Title | From Album | Length |
|---|---|---|---|
| 1. | "Fuck It Up" | Notes From Thee Underground |
| 2. | "Ten Ground and Down" | Fook |
| 3. | "Asphole" | Notes From Thee Underground |
| 4. | "Seven Words" | Fook |
| 5. | "Hagseed" (Slagseed Slagadelic Mix) | Feels Like Heaven |
| 6. | "Empathy" | Notes From Thee Underground |
| 7. | "I Can Do No Wrong" | Truth Will Out |
| 8. | "Magazine" | Notes From Thee Underground |
| 9. | "Think (Addiction/Salvation Mix)" | Feels Like Heaven |
| 10. | "Sick Asp F**k Full Gimball/No1 Club Mix" | Feels Like Heaven |
| 11. | "Satellite" | Fook |
| 12. | "Your Own You Own" | Notes From Thee Underground |
| 13. | "Steamroller" | Notes From Thee Underground |
| 14. | "Burundi" | A New High In Low |
| 15. | "Chickasuarus" | The Best of Pigface: Preaching to the Perverted |

Disc 3
| No. | Title | From Album | Length |
|---|---|---|---|
| 1. | "Nutopia" | A New High In Low |
| 2. | "Closer To Heaven" | Easy Listening... |
| 3. | "Methylated" | A New High In Low |
| 4. | "Bring Unto Me" | A New High In Low |
| 5. | "Horse You Road In On" | Previously unreleased |
| 6. | "First Taken Third Found" | A New High In Low |
| 7. | "King of Negativity" | Easy Listening... |
| 8. | "Metal Tangerine" | A New High In Low |
| 9. | "Everything" | Easy Listening... |
| 10. | "Kiss King" | A New High In Low |
| 11. | "Insect / Suspect" | Easy Listening... |
| 12. | "Sweetmeat" | Easy Listening... |
| 13. | "You Know/You Know/You Know" | A New High In Low |
| 14. | "Gospel of Thomas Dub" | Dubhead |

Disc 4
| No. | Title | From Album | Length |
|---|---|---|---|
| 1. | "Martin Atkins Interview" | Lean Juicy Pork |
| 2. | "Dog" | The Best of Pigface: Preaching to the Perverted |
| 3. | "Steamroller/Blow You Away (Omegaman vs. Jared In The Head Remix/Beat To The Edit)" | Clubhead |
| 4. | "Psychic Phonecall" | Previously unreleased |
| 5. | "Ogre Interview" | Lean Juicy Pork |
| 6. | "Insects" | Hate Dept.’s Ditch |
| 7. | "Insect / Suspect" | Easy Listening... |
| 8. | "Insemination" | Previously unreleased |
| 9. | "En Esch Interview" | Lean Juicy Pork |
| 10. | "Bedazzled" (Written by Dudley Moore & Peter Cook) | The Love Interest’s Bedazzled EP |
| 11. | "Little Sisters Remix" | Lean Juicy Pork |
| 12. | "Divebomber" | Previously unreleased |
| 13. | "Mickey #1" | The Best of Pigface: Preaching to the Perverted |
| 14. | "William Tucker Interview" | Lean Juicy Pork |
