= Anti Tank Guitar =

String instrument

A.T.G. - Anti Tank Guitar
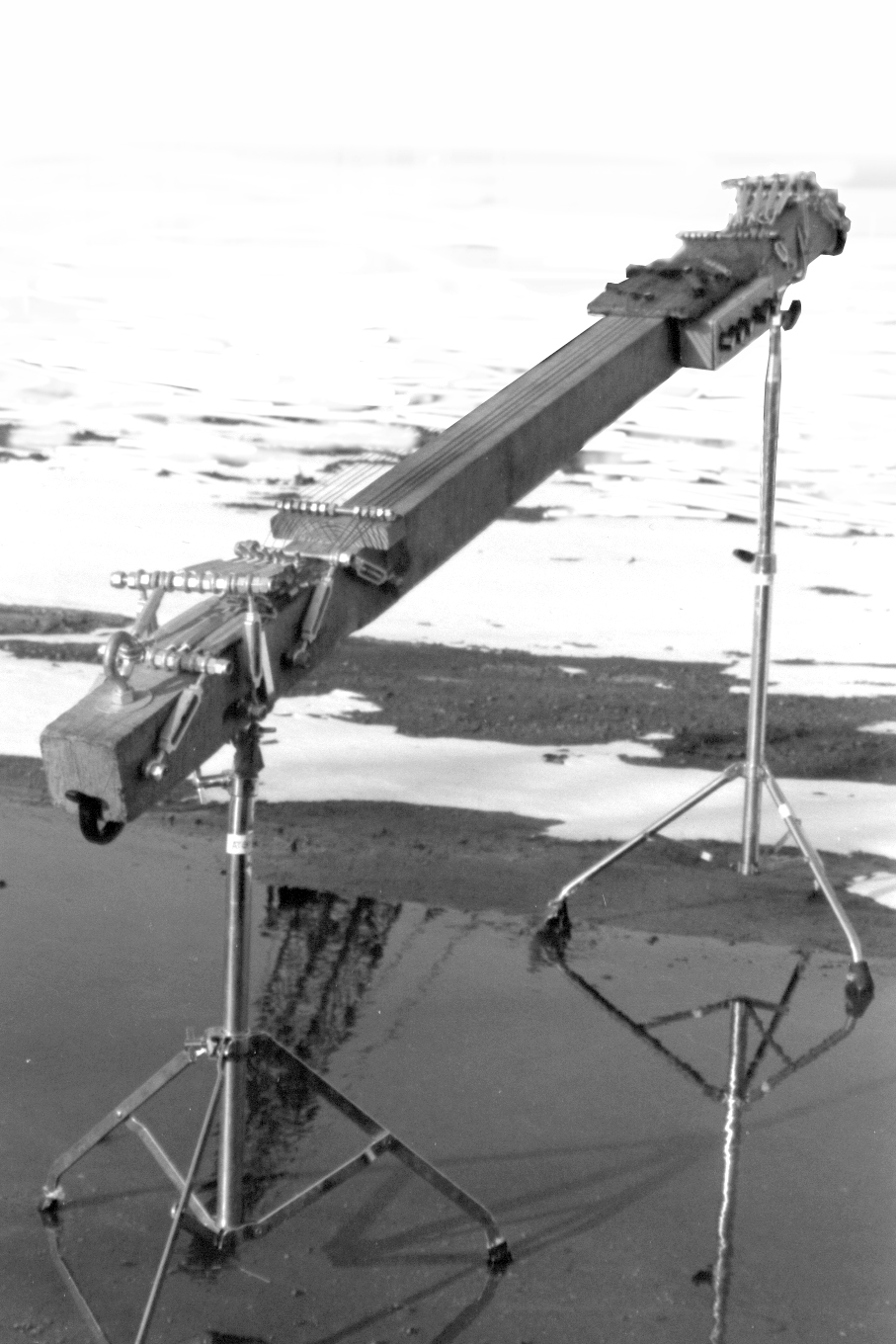
- The instrument designed by Matthew Schultz
- Classification: String instrument (plucked.)

Related instruments
- Bowed and plucked string instruments

The Anti Tank Guitar or A.T.G. is a large multi-stringed instrument that can express tones including and beyond the chromatic scale.

== History ==
The most notable A.T.G. was designed by Matthew Schultz in 1989. It was based on a conceptually designed instrument by experimental musician Brad Braun. Since 1990, Schultz has created five variations, named Mark I, Mark II, Mark III, Mark IV and Mark V respectively. It was most notably used in Schultz's musical project Lab Report, as well as during his time performing with Pigface. It has appeared on 18 albums. It was described by Pigface vocalist Chris Connelly as "a large rail-way sleeper with piano wire which was stretched over the guitar so that it could be played..." Sonic Boom Magazine stated "The Anti Tank Guitar...has made Lab Report more of an acoustic terrorist movement than a band since their inception." The instrument is a large stringed instrument capable of producing everything from the mimicked sounds of guitar and bass to monstrous percussive blows. Veteran sound engineer/producer/remixer Lee Popa (Cheap Trick/Ministry/Living Colour/Korn/White Zombie) had a hard time describing the A.T.G and exclaimed. “You just can't describe something like that. It's kind of like hitting a telephone wire with a sledgehammer.” "

== Designs ==
The first ATG, according to Schultz, "was a four-by-four beam that was eight feet long and five feet from bridge to bridge. It contained six single-strand wires in the spacing of a guitar, to match the poles on a guitar pickup. The wire ranged from 24 to 18 gauge. Next to it was another set of four strings spaced apart, to match a bass guitar pickup. These strings were woven wires that you would use on your garage door pulley system. They were totally percussive when struck." It was often played with an EBow or cello bow as well as being hammered and/or plucked. This version of the instrument was used for "The Love Serenade (I Hate You?)" on the Pigface album Welcome to Mexico... Asshole. Various versions of the A.T.G. have appeared on other albums as well. Over the years the later versions became increasingly slim-lined and made of a ridged thin metal frames. To date, there are five versions including the Mark I-V."

== Later uses ==
Schultz uses the A.T.G. a meditative device. He creates singular tones similar to a singing bowl, he has furthered the instruments potential by creating cymatic images based on the tones made by the device. Schultz's newer works are based on healing tones for the chakras and are featured on his Mandalas album.

== Discography where A.T.G appears ==
=== Matt Schultz ===
- Mandalas (2012)
- Militant (2012)
- Mantras (2010) (Lens Records)

=== Lab Report ===
- Fig X-71 (1991) (Invisible Records)
- Unhealthy (1993) (Invisible Records)
- Terminal (1995) (Invisible Records)
- Excision (1997) (Invisible Records)
- -Classical -Atmospheres (1999) (Gein Records)
- 2000 After Death Live (2000) (Gein Records)

=== Pigface ===
- Spoon Breakfast EP (1990)
- Lean Juicy Pork (1990)
- Gub (1991)
- Welcome to Mexico... Asshole (1991)

=== Compilations ===
- Industrial Revolution - First Edition (1993)
- Industrial Revolution - Second Edition (1994)
- Total Devotion (1994)
- Invisible Route Six Six Six (1995)
- Can You See It Yet? (1995)
- Drug Test 1 & 2 (1995)
- Drug Test 3 & 4 (1997)
- F*cking Sick and Menacing (1097)
- Ultrasonik (1998)
- Eye Grind Disturbance? (1998)
- Gone Too Far (1999)
- The Information Apocalypse Comp (2002)
