= Lacey Sculls =

American entertainer

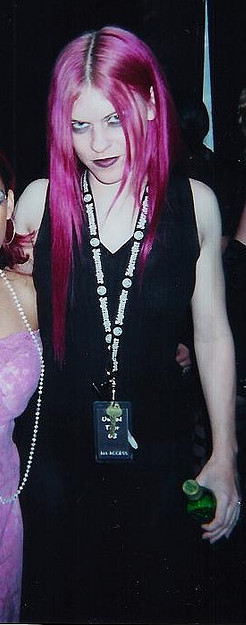
- Sculls in 2008
- Born: Lacey Conner; Dallas, Texas, U.S
- Occupations: singer, songwriter, activist, reality television star, entrepreneur
- Years active: 1995-present
- Television: Rock of Love with Bret Michaels
- Spouse: Jonny Sculls (2013-present)
- Father: Otis Conner
- Website: https://www.laceysculls.com

Lacey Sculls (née Conner), is an American singer, songwriter, activist, reality television star and entrepreneur. She is best known as the lead singer of the industrial rock band Nocturne, and for her appearances on the hit VH1 celebreality series Rock of Love with Bret Michaels and Rock of Love: Charm School.

== Music career ==
Sculls was the lead singer of the industrial rock band Nocturne which formed in Dallas, Texas in 1995, who released their first official album Twilight in 1999. They went on to release another further three albums in 2001, 2002 and 2003, until releasing their final and most successful in 2005 titled; Guide To Extinction. The album focused on the real life break-up between Sculls and the band's guitarist Chris Telkes, as well as criticism of the U.S government and U.S politics. The band went on to feature as the opening act for Pigface during their 2005 "Free For All" tour, Sculls also provided backing vocals for the band for their 2003 studio album Easy Listening. The bands single Shallow was performed by Sculls at the Rock of Love with Bret Michaels season 1 reunion special, she also had a minor role in the 2007 film Reservation Road as a performer. She can play the drums and the guitar.

In 2010, she joined Lords of Acid during their tour as the special guest lead vocalist. She went on to work as the spokesmodel and host for a live web cast, for the company Dean Guitars. She was live for two full days interviewing musicians and rock stars at the NAMM convention.

In 2011, she began working on her first official solo album titled; Something Evil This Way Comes, under the project name HALO, which she released in 2012. She appeared as the female lead for the music video of Escape the Fate's 2013, single You're Insane.

== Television career ==
In 2007, Sculls appeared as a contestant on the first season of the hit VH1 celebreality series Rock of Love with Bret Michaels, where she placed third overall. During her time on the show she was infamously portrayed as a villain feuding with a majority of her fellow cast members, most notably with Dallas Harrison and eventual winner Jes Rickleff. She guest appeared on the second and third seasons of the show due to her popularity.

In 2008, she went on to appear as a contestant on the VH1 celebreality spin-off series, Rock of Love: Charm School, where she also placed third overall. Where she infamously feuded with almost the entire cast.

In 2009, she filmed the unaired third season of the VH1 celebreality spin-off series, I Love Money, which was canceled and unaired due to the murder of Jasmine Fiore. It was confirmed by Sculls in a tell all by the cast that she placed sixth overall.

In 2019, alongside fellow former Rock of Love season 1, cast member Heather Chadwell she began a podcast titled; Talk of Love, shortly after Sculls took over as the lead host and executive producer. She went on to launch the online streaming service StormTV. She produced her own shows including a VH1 celebreality all star reunion special and various talk shows.

== Activism ==
Sculls is an animal rights activist and human rights activist, openly supporting the Black Lives Matter movement and the LGBTQ+ community. She is a vegetarian, her and her husband own a non-profit dog rescue charity named K9 Heroes Rescue.

In 2010, she featured in the animal rights documentary, Skin Trade.

== Personal life ==
Sculls married her husband Jonny Sculls in 2013. In 2019, the couple were involved in a road rage incident with Lacey being accused of biting off part of the alleged victims ear, the couple were later acquitted by the court. They were also sued in 2017, over a bar brawl incident in Los Angeles.

== Filmography ==
Film and television credits
Year	Title	Role	Notes
2001	Texas Justice	Self; plaintiff	1 episode
2006	Free For All	Self; feature	Documentary
2007	Rock of Love with Bret Michaels season 1	Self; contestant	3rd place, 12 episodes
2007	Reservation Road	Performer	Special thanks
2008	Rock of Love with Bret Michaels season 2	Self; guest	1 episode
2008	Rock of Love: Charm School	Self; contestant	3rd place, 12 episodes
2008	VH1: All Access	Self; guest	1 episode
2008	Biography	Self; feature	1 episode
2009	Rock of Love Bus with Bret Michaels	Self; guest	1 episode
2009	I Love Money season 3	Self; contestant	Unaired
2010	Skin Trade	Self; feature	Documentary
2010	Rock of Love Girls: Where Are They Now	Self; feature	TV special
2019	Room 37: The Mysterious Death of Johnny Thunders	Lady in bar	Uncredited
2019	What the CLUCK	Self; interviewee	Web series, 1 episode
2019	Talk of Love	Self; host	Web series, 110 episodes
2020	Love of Talk	Self; host	Web series, 3 episodes
2020	#NoFilter with Zack Peter	Self; guest	Podcast, 1 episode
2021	All Stars Reunion Show	Self; host	Web series, 2 episodes
2022	What the French with Farrah and Ashley	Self; co-host	Web series, 10 episodes
2022	From Vegas with Love	Self; co-host	Web series, 3 episodes
2023	KLAS-TV	Self; animal rights activist	1 episode

Music videos
Year	Title	Artist	Role
2007	Shallow	Nocturne	Female lead
2013	You're Insane	Escape the Fate	Female lead
2015	Let's Get Naked	Fake Friends	Model

== Discography ==
Albums
Year	Album	Labels	Notes
1999	Twilight	Triple X Records / Hollows Hill	Debut album
2001	Welcome to Paradise	Triple X Records / Hollows Hill	
2002	Paradise Wasted	Invisible Records / Underground Inc.	Re-release album
2003	Axis of Evil: Mixes of Mass Destruction	Invisible Records / Underground Inc.	Remix album
2005	Guide to Extinction	Triple X Records	
2012	Something Evil This Way Comes	N/A	Solo album
