= Matthew Schultz =

American musician

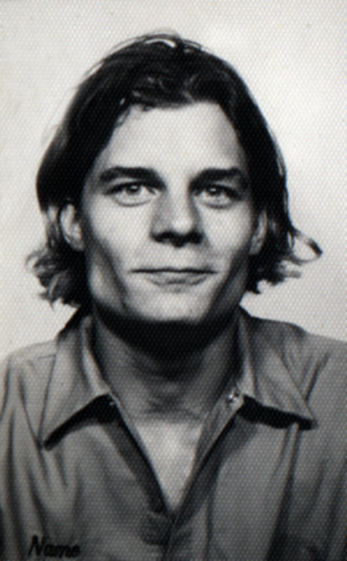

Background information
- Born: Matthew Schultz; Enid, Oklahoma, United States
- Genres: Dark ambient, world music, industrial
- Occupations: Artist; Musician
- Instruments: Anti Tank Guitar; Keyboards
- Labels: Lens; Gein; Invisible Records

Matthew Schultz (Enid, Oklahoma, United States) is an American musician. He is best known as the creator of the Anti Tank Guitar or A.T.G., used primarily during his work with Lab Report and Pigface, as well as for scoring music for director, Bernard Rose.

== History ==
In 1990, Matthew Schultz and Eric Pounder founded the experimental, dark ambient, improvisational, music project Lab Report and were signed to Invisible Records. Schultz was the creator of the Anti Tank Guitar or A.T.G. Schultz used this instrument on the first four Lab Report albums as well as on the first three Pigface albums. Schultz went on as the head of Lab Report and released four more albums with his own record label, Gein. The music style of these projects broadened and became increasingly more multi-media. Schultz went solo and released seven more albums under his own name. He also composed musical scores for Hollywood horror director, Bernard Rose. The movies include Ivans Xtc and Snuff-Movie.

== Later works ==
In 2010 Schultz became the museum curator, collector and lead historian for The Exhibition for The History of The Division. This esoteric fraternal order is similar to the Freemasons and spans back centuries. Schultz wrote two CDs Mantras and Militant for the exhibition.

Schultz works in shamanic and indigenous practices. He creates sacred geometric artwork and mandalas. Now, he utilizes the A.T.G. to generate chakra healing frequencies and binaural beat mediations. In 2012 he published a book and corresponding CD titled Mandalas and runs events and exhibitions based on sacred geometry. He was the keynote speaker at the Buckminster Fuller: Exploring the Sacred Geometry of Nature art show.

In 2020, Schultz's book, titled The Dark and the Light - Trauma, Addiction, Shamanism, Ayahuasca, was released. In this memoir, Schultz not only shares his experiences with sacred medicines and indigenous rituals but also bizarre stories from his childhood.

== Discography ==
=== Solo work ===
- Witches (1998)
- Blue Lady (2000)
- Subla Kahn Nine One One (2002)
- Foundspaces (2005)
- Loops (2007)
- Something Completely Different (2007)
- The Division Mantras (2010)
- Mandalas (2011)
- Militant (2012)
- Angels (2020)
- Aya (2020)
- Sacrifice to the Gods (2024)

=== Soundtrack work ===
- Ivans Xtc (2000)
- Snuff-Movie

=== with Lab Report ===
- Fig X-71 (1991)
- Unhealthy (1993)
- Terminal (1995)
- Excision (1997)
- All Your Little Pieces, Make Me a Whole (1998)
- -Classical -Atmospheres (1999)
- 2000 After Death Live (2000)

=== with Pigface ===
- Lean Juicy Pork (1990)
- Gub (1991)
- Welcome to Mexico... Asshole (1991)
- Fook (1992)
- Truth Will Out (1993)

=== with Lard ===
- 70's Rock Must Die (2000)
