= Guide to Extinction =

Studio album by Nocturne
- Released: April 15, 2005
- Recorded: 2004
- Genre: Industrial metal
- Length: 48:16
- Label: Triple X Records
- Producer: Chris Telkes

Nocturne chronology
Welcome to Paradise (2001)	Guide to Extinction (2005)

Singles from Guide to Extinction
- 1. "I Lie" Released: April 11, 2005; 2. "Shallow" Released: 18 October 2005; 3. "Nothing" Released: December 2006

Guide to Extinction is the third studio album of industrial rock band Nocturne. It was their first studio album after 2001's Welcome to Paradise. The album was finally released in 2005, shortly after the break-up of the romantic relationship between producer, guitarist Chris Telkes and singer Lacey Conner. Even with this emotional stress upon the band's core members, the album was considered Nocturne's best showcase, and features a variety of tracks that quietly hint at the past, the band did a few months of touring, and afterward, was "put on hold for an indefinite period of time". This was their last album before the band's breakup.

== Background and composition ==
After leaving Invisible Records, Nocturne signed again with Triple X Records and began producing their third studio album. The album's themes deal with break-up and relationship, hinting at the 8 year-long relationship between lead singer Lacey Conner and Telkes, which ended shortly after beginning production for Guide to Extinction. The album's opening song is Shallow, written by Telkes, in which Conner's lyrics change harshly between screaming and emoting flirtatiously. The lead single I Lie was written by Conner, and its lyrics refer to relationships that go awry. The song is a goth/Industrial metal record with some synthesizers and programming. Dirty Sanchez, Alibi and Passion all talk about break up, while songs like Class War and Dead Man are satirical criticisms of the government and actual politics.

== Critical reception ==
Professional ratings
Review scores
Source	Rating
AllMusic	2.5/5 stars
From Out of Nowhere	(81/100)
Blogcritics	(positive)
RocknWorld	4/5 stars
Dead Puppy Records	(positive)
Sea of Tranquility	3.5/5 stars
Dead Tide	(unfavourable)
Schwegweb	(positive)

Considered Nocturne's best, the album received positive reviews from music critics. O.M.O.M from fromoutofnowhere.com gave the album a score of 81/100 saying that "Nocturne have emerged from the wreckage with a solid record that is full of attitude, anger and passion". Greg Prato, of Allmusic however was more dismissing stating that Guide to Extinction "turns out to be another healthy helping of aggro/electro rock" further adding "It's admirable that Nocturne attempt to throw listeners a few curve balls, but it's hard not to feel that you've heard most of this before". Chris Beaumont from Blogcritics gave the album a positive review, praising Conner's vocals saying "Lacey Conner has a great voice, whether she is singing melodically or growling, she has a unique voice and delivery." and praising the overall mixing and instrumentation. Eric Bodrero from Rocknworld gave the album 4 out of 5 stars, saying "Most of the tracks here are surprisingly catchy (...) The production is clean and fluid, the pacing well done, and the tracks are all as tight and smooth as a woven bamboo urn." and commended Lacey Conner for her vocals, calling them "a female version of Rob Zombie" and adding "Guide To Extinction furthers this popular bands uprising and positions them one step closer to industrial goth gods, if they aren't there already."

== Touring and promotion ==
Nocturne toured as the opening act of Pigface in The Free For All Tour and Dope & Mushroomhead's The Music For Freedom Tour promoting Guide to Extinction during spring and summer/fall of 2005. After this the band went on an indefinite hiatus that continues up to today, although Conner and Telkes reunited in 2007 to perform single Shallow in the reunion show of the first season VH1's Rock of Love with Bret Michaels.

== Track listing ==
No.	Title	Writer(s)	Length
1.	"Shallow"	Chris Telkes	3:47
2.	"I Lie"	Lacey Conner	3:51
3.	"Alibi"	Lacey Conner	3:24
4.	"Passion"	Chris Telkes	3:49
5.	"Walk Away"	Lacey Conner	5:19
6.	"Indulge"	Lacey Conner	3:19
7.	"Class War"	Chris Telkes	4:04
8.	"Nothing"	Chris Telkes	4:01
9.	"Dirty Sanchez"	Chris Telkes	2:56
10.	"No Way Out"	Lacey Conner	4:22
11.	"Dead Man"	Chris Telkes	4:33
12.	"Cocaine Sex"	Renegade Soundwave	4:51
Total length:			48:16

== Credits and personnel ==
- Lacey Conner (Synthesizer, Guitar, Song-writing, Vocals)
- Chris Telkes (Synthesizer, Backing Vocals, Multi Instruments, Audio Production, Mixing, Sampling, Engineering, Producing, Programming, Bass, Guitar, Song-writing)
- David Osbourn (Drums)
- Aimee Lombard (Layout Design)
- Renegade Soundwave (Song-writing)
- Tim Gerron (Mastering)
