= Spoon Breakfast =

Spoon Breakfast EP

EP by Pigface
- Released: 1990
- Genre: Industrial, industrial rock
- Label: Invisible Records

Pigface chronology
Spoon Breakfast EP (1990)	Lean Juicy Pork (1990)

Professional ratings
Review scores
Source	Rating
AllMusic	3/5 stars

Spoon Breakfast EP is an extended play disc released just before the group's debut album, Gub. It is now a heavily sought after Pigface collectible. Chris Connelly only appears on the first track; the rest are done by Martin Atkins and others.

== Track listing ==
1. "Tonight's the Night (Little Sisters) (Remix)" (Martin Atkins, Chris Connelly, Bill Rieflin, William Tucker)
2. "Winnebago Induced Tapeworm (Remix)" (Martin Atkins, Ogilvie, Bill Rieflin)
3. "Bushmaster Bushmaster (Remix)" (Martin Atkins, Bill Rieflin, David Yow)
4. "War Ich Nicht Immer Ein Guter Junge? (Remix)" (Martin Atkins, En Esch, Bill Rieflin)
