= Telkes =

Telkes is a Hungarian surname.

People with this name include:

- Chris Telkes, U.S. musician
- Mária Telkes (1900–1995), Hungarian-American scientist

== See also ==
- 390743 Telkesmária, an asteroid
