= Truth Will Out =

Live album by Pigface
- Released: 1993
- Genre: Industrial
- Length: 64:49
- Label: Invisible Records

Pigface chronology
| Washingmachine Mouth (1993) | Truth Will Out (1993) | Notes From Thee Underground (1994) |

Truth Will Out is a 1993 live album by Pigface. The album was recorded at Cabaret Metro in Chicago, Illinois, on December 22, 1992. While the album contains selected songs from the show, Invisible Records released the performance, in its entirety, in 2006 as part of their Pigface Live Archive series.

== Track listing ==
| No. | Title | Length |
|---|---|---|
| 1. | "Can You Feel Pain?" | 8:19 |
| 2. | "War Ich Nicht" | 5:34 |
| 3. | "Point Blank" | 5:19 |
| 4. | "Do No Wrong" | 7:19 |
| 5. | "Weightless" | 5:11 |
| 6. | "White Trash Reggae - Pigface In Your Area" | 5:30 |
| 7. | "Alles Ist Mein" | 2:21 |
| 8. | "Hips, Tits, Lips, Power!" | 7:12 |
| 9. | "7 Words" | 4:21 |
| 10. | "Henry" | 2:45 |
| 11. | "Jingle Bells" | 4:46 |
| 12. | "Suck" | 6:12 |

== Personnel ==
- Martin Atkins - drums
- Genesis Breyer P-Orridge - keyboards
- Jim Marcus - vocals
- Pete Conway - guitar, bass
- En Esch - vocals, guitar
- Barb Ruchoft - cello
- Nivek Ogre - vocals
- Andrew Weiss - bass
- Hope Nicholls - drums
- Matthew Schultz - anti tank guitar
- William Tucker - guitar
- Theo Van Rock - engineer
