= Below the Belt (Pigface album) =

Remix album by Pigface
- Released: April 21, 1998
- Genre: Industrial
- Length: 74:00
- Label: Invisible Records

Pigface chronology
A New High in Low (1997)	Below the Belt (1998)	Eat Shit You Fucking Redneck (1998)

Below The Belt is a remix album released by Pigface in 1998. The album is a companion piece to the A New High in Low LP and features remixes by artists such as Tranquility Bass, Justin Broadrick, Mick Harris, Scanner, Sheep on Drugs, and Hanzel und Gretyl.

== Track listing ==
No.	Title	Remixer	Length
1.	"Radio Bagpipe" (The Protomartyr Mix)	Curse Mackey
2.	"Kiss King" (Saint James Mix)	James Galus
3.	"Burundi" (Overload Mix)	Justin Broadrick
4.	"More" (Fly Away Mix)	Subgenius
5.	"Nutopia" (The Looptopia Mix)	Hanzel und Gretyl
6.	"More Methylated" (Sheep on Drugs Remix)	Lee Fraser
7.	"Metal Tangerine" (Forever Georgia Peach Mix)	Resident Phase Shifter
8.	"First Taken Third Found" (Phylr Remix)	JF Coleman
9.	"Burundi" (The Shore Suite Mix)	Scanner
10.	"Nutopia" (Warzone Mix)	Van Christie
11.	"More" (Moseley Cupboard Smash Up)	Quoit and Mick Harris
12.	"Warzone" (Satellite Transmission Mix)	Tranquility Bass
13.	"You Know . . ." (Nothing Mix)	Bagman
