= Preaching to the Perverted =

Preaching to the Perverted may refer to:

- "Preaching to the Perverted", by Pop Will Eat Itself from This Is the Day...This Is the Hour...This Is This!, 1989
- Preaching to the Perverted (film), a 1997 British comedy film
- The Best of Pigface: Preaching to the Perverted
- Preaching to the Perverted (The Fuzztones album), 2011
