= Crackhead: The DJ? Acucrack Remix Album =

Remix album by Pigface and DJ? Acucrack
- Released: August 3, 2004
- Genre: Industrial
- Label: Underground Inc.

Pigface and DJ? Acucrack chronology
Clubhead Nonstopmegamix #1 (2004)	Crackhead: The DJ? Acucrack Remix Album (2004)	8 Bit Head (2004)

Crackhead: The DJ? Acucrack Remix Album is a 2004 remix album by Pigface and DJ? Acucrack. It was rated 3.5 stars by AllMusic.

== Track listing ==
No.	Title	Length
1.	"Insect / Suspect (Suck A Loop Just For Funk)"	4:31
2.	"Sweetmeat (Electroqueen Pheremones)"	4:53
3.	"King Of Negativity (Clean Up Your Holes)"	3:19
4.	"First Taken Third Found (UK Respect VIP Mix)"	5:39
5.	"Blow You Away (Trentification Mix)"	5:04
6.	"Mind Your Own Business (The Taste Behind Me)"	4:13
7.	"Bitch (Own Your Own Edsel)"	3:58
8.	"Du Liebst Mich Nicht, Ich Lieb' Dich Nicht (Deutschland Distortion Mix)"	6:13
9.	"Everything (Sex Farm Club Mix)"	5:01
10.	"Alles Ist Mine (Fookness Interruptus)"	4:33
11.	"Closer To Heaven (Acumen Sets The Controls For The Heart Of The Sun)"	6:17
