= Deist Requiem =

US musical group

- Origin: Virginia Beach, Virginia
- Genres: Industrial rock - Heavy Metal
- Years active: 1991 - present
- Labels: Sacrifice Records War Head Records Invisible Records
- Members: Kyzer Kooper Lucky Riggs Mark Flyge Mike Gotte

Deist Requiem is an industrial rock band from Virginia Beach, Virginia, founded by frontman Kyzer Kooper (born William Alan Cooper in 1973 in Kingsport, Tennessee). The band was signed to Warhead Records America for its self-titled CD which was produced by Martin Atkins (Pigface, Ministry, Nine Inch Nails). After dropping the label as a result of disputes over rights and money , the band then went out on their own label, Sacrifice Records.

The band toured across the United States for several years, gaining a large underground following, while opening for bands such as Alice Cooper, Scorpions, Gwar, Marilyn Manson, Morbid Angel, Kid Rock, Sevendust, Sister machine Gunn, La Guns, Hate Dept, King's X (Poundhound with Dug Pinnick), Boiler, Dog Fashion Disco, Overkill, Nile, Staind, The Dave Brockie Experience, Bongzilla, Bad Religion, Wednesday 13, Lamb of God and many more. DEIST REQUIEM was signed and endorsed by Jägermeister in 1998 and was one of the first in the Jäger band promotion. After disbanding in 2002, Kyzer Kooper and the co-founding guitar player David Wright joined with keyboardist Toad and bassist Jeff Daye to form DEVIL JOY, they released one CD called The Fine Art of Failure in 2006.

In 2009, Kyzer Kooper formed the band America's Most Rotten. The band went on a small number of tours, recorded a CD, and promptly disbanded. However, the CD was never released. In 2010, Kooper reformed DEIST with Red Burke (bass), Lucky Riggs (guitar) and Scott Stewart (drums) for a series of concerts.

In 2011, former drummer Jodi Joy joined Universal Records recording artist Hear Kitty Kitty, as of 2012 Joy was no longer with the band.

Former bass player Brian Powers is now a member of the country group Phoenix Drive.

Former guitar player Brance Arnold is one half of the country duo Chacho and Brance. They are regulars on the nationally syndicated show Troubadour TX.

The 2013 horror film Music Store Massacre starring David Meadows and Gordon Price featured 4 songs by the band. Lead singer Kyzer Kooper also made his film debut under his real name William Cooper.

Deist Requiem returned to the stage October 19, 2013 at Zakk's in Murfreesboro, North Carolina. This was then followed by Halloween Night at Jewish Mother in Virginia Beach, VA on October 31, 2013.

Work on CD recorded at Gwar's Slave Pit Studio is complete and will be released March 3, 2015 via Sacrifice Records. The CD will be titled "The Happiness Delusion". This is the last recordings to feature what some consider the 'classic' line up. The CD was Produced, Mixed and Mastered by h3, singer of hERETICS iN tHE lAB.

March 21, 2015 at The Riff House in Chesapeake, Va Mark Flyge (Former Bane, 8 Fraud guitarist) performed his first show with Deist Requiem. He has officially joined Deist Requiem as a second guitarist. This is the first time the band has carried a 2 guitar player lineup on a permanent basis.

The song 'Sugar Daddy Serenade' from the CD 'The Happiness Delusion' will be featured in the upcoming 2016 horror film 'The Devil's Door'.

== Band line-up ==
Kyzer Kooper Vocals/Keyboards/Programming (1991–present)

Mark Flyge Guitar / Bass (2015–2019)

Mike Gotte Drums (2012–2019)

Lucky Riggs Guitar (2010 - 2015 / 2017–2019)

== Former members ==
Brad Way Keyboards/Programming (1991-1993)

David Isley Vocals/Programming (1991-1993)

David Wright Guitar (1993-1996 / 2002-2003)

Bryan Wray Drums (1993-1995)

Brian Powers Bass (1995-2002)

Jodi Joy Drums (1995-2002)

Mike Adams Guitar (1994-1995)

Lucas Marino Guitar (1997-1998)

Juan Marerro Guitar (1998-2000)

Brance Arnold Guitar (2000-2002)

Jeff Daye Bass (2002-2003)

Allen King Drums (2002-2003)

Scott Stewart Drums (2010-2012)

Red Burke Bass (2010 - 2015)

== Discography ==
Deitiphobia (Tape Release only) 1992

Side One:

1. Bright Darkness Of The Soul
2. Death My Wonderful Home
3. No More Sunshine
4. Trapped Under Ice
5. Crucified Before Fools

Side Two:

1. Dark Child
2. Colourless Insanity
3. Fools 2 Follow
4. The Crow
5. My Trip

Deist Requiem War Head Records 1996

1. Jesus Lives in Waco
2. Fucked-Up Way to Die
3. Harder
4. Parasite System
5. Happy
6. The In between
7. Wanna Be God
8. The Closet
9. Nothing Left To Give
10. Requiem For A Generation

Hate Songs From The Heart Sacrifice Records 1998

1. Luggagebabby
2. Letter2Luc
3. Spooky Mama Eats Electric
4. Prozac
5. Circumcision
6. I Want To Fuck You Underneath The Milky Way
7. No U/Invitation
8. PCP (Psycho Cunt Phobia)
9. Dope Fiend Smile
10. Faces Of The Men
11. Massive Mind Fuck
12. Sacrifice Of The Day

A Tribute To Ministry 1999 on Invisible Records Another Prick In The Wall

1. Land Of Rape And Honey—Electric Hellfire Club
2. Jesus Built My Hotrod—Shining
3. Work for Love—En Esch
4. Just One Fix—Meg Lee Chin
5. So What—Terminal 46
6. Thieves—Resident Phase Shifter
7. The Cannibal Song—Attrition
8. She's Got a Cause—The Aliens
9. Revenge—Dessau
10. Deity—Deist Requiem
11. You Know What You Are—Sons of Midnight
12. Just One Fix—Heavy Water Factory

Trendy Sacrifice Records 2000

1. Trendy
2. 15 Minutes
3. What Will Make Us Do It?
4. Harder (live)
5. Fucked Up Way to Die (live)
6. Sacrifice of the Day (live)
7. Prozac (live)
8. Deity

Deist : Requiem for a generation 1992–2002 Sacrifice Records 2002(OUT OF PRINT)

Deist Side

Disc 1

1. Scapegoat
2. Misplaced
3. Sorry You Love Me
4. Spooky Mama Eats Electric (Remix)
5. Letter2Luc (Remix)
6. Luggage Baby (Remix)
7. Sacrifice Of The Day
8. PCP
9. Prozac
10. No U/Invitation
11. I Want To Fuck You Underneath The Milky Way
12. Circumcision
13. Faces Of The Men
14. Dope Fiend Smile
15. Massive Mind Fuck
16. Trendy
17. 15 Minutes
18. What Will Make Us Do It Requiem Side

Requiem Side Disc 2

1. Fucked-Up Way 2 Die
2. Harder
3. Wanna Be God
4. Parasite System
5. The Closet
6. Happy
7. Jesus Lives In Waco
8. Nothing Left 2 Give
9. The In between
10. Requiem For A Generation
11. Deity
12. Devil In My Closet (demo)
13. Happy (demo)

Absence of Faith: The Best of Deist Requiem Sacrifice Records 2010

1. Fucked Up Way 2 Die
2. Trendy
3. Harder
4. Parasite System
5. 15 minutes
6. Wanna Be God
7. Spooky Mama Eats Electric (Greco Remix)
8. What Will Make Us Do It?
9. Luggage Baby (Greco Remix)
10. The In between
11. Letter2Luc (Greco remix)
12. Scapegoat (Demo)
13. Misplaced (Demo)
14. Sorry You Love Me (Demo)
15. Deity
16. Prozac

The Happiness Delusion Sacrifice Records (Released March 3, 2015)

1. Scapegoat
2. Motherfucker Talked Through The Whole Damn Movie
3. Misplaced
4. Sorry You Love Me
5. God On A Good Day (Featuring Roddy Lane)
6. This Grey Day
7. G.D.H.B.
8. Fiend
9. Sugar Daddy Serenade
10. Nobody
