= The Love Interest =

Short lived US pop group

- Origin: USA
- Years active: 1993–1993
- Label: Invisible
- Past members: Martin Atkins; Chris Connelly; David Wm. Sims; Mary Lynn Bowling

The Love Interest was a short-lived collaborative musical project between musicians Martin Atkins, Chris Connelly, David Wm. Sims, and Mary Lynn Bowling. The group released only one recording: (1993's "Bedazzled" EP on Atkins' Invisible Records label).

"Bedazzled" is a cover of the theme from Dudley Moore and Peter Cook's 1967 film Bedazzled, with words and music written by Moore.

== Reception ==
Ira Robbins of Trouser Press wrote, "'Bedazzled' is a four-mix single of the Dudley Moore composition for the 1968 movie of the same name, given a big beat, a pop vocal and sample seasoning. The basic performance is stylish enough, but it could have been an album track. One version is plenty."
