= Lean Juicy Pork =

Compilation album by Pigface
- Released: 1991
- Genre: Industrial, noise, interview
- Length: 63:17
- Label: Invisible Records

Pigface chronology
Spoon Breakfast EP (1990)	Lean Juicy Pork (1991)	Gub (1991)

Lean Juicy Pork was a promotional interview CD from Industrial supergroup Pigface, released in 1991, as a companion to Welcome to Mexico... Asshole

It mainly featuring members of Pigface discussing what being in the band means to them. The album consists of interviews and a few remixes or "live" versions of songs.

== Track listing ==
No.	Title	Credit	Length
1.	"Nivek Ogre"		1:30
2.	"Suck"		5:14
3.	"Martin Atkins #1"	Martin Atkins	3:00
4.	"William Tucker"	William Tucker	0:32
5.	"Matt Schultz"	Matt Schultz	5:00
6.	"En Esch"	En Esch	1:02
7.	"Collaborama"	Martin Atkins	2:06
8.	"Bill Rieflin"	Bill Rieflin	5:46
9.	"Tonight's the Night" (Little Sisters Remix)	Martin Atkins, Chris Connelly, Bill Rieflin, William Tucker	3:06
10.	"The Image of Red Cut in Half"	Martin Atkins, Chris Connelly, Bill Rieflin, William Tucker	4:32
11.	"Chris Connelly"	Chris Connelly	2:48
12.	"Ogre Bleeped"		1:27
13.	"Beneath My Feet"	Martin Atkins	5:00
14.	"Martin Atkins #2"	Martin Atkins	6:06
15.	"William Tucker Bleeped"	William Tucker	0:32
16.	"Bushmaster"	Martin Atkins, Bill Rieflin	5:22
17.	"Pool Hall Remix"	Martin Atkins, Bill Rieflin	0:59

== Personnel ==
- Martin Atkins - drums
- Bill Rieflin - drums
- Chris Connelly - vocals
- En Esch - vocals
- Nivek Ogre - vocals
- Paul Raven - bass
- Matt Schultz - keyboards
- William Tucker - guitar
