= 8 Bit Head =

8 Bit Head: Complete Remix of Easy Listening + Other Stuff

Remix album by Pigface and Defrag
- Released: October 12, 2004
- Genre: Industrial
- Label: Underground Inc.

Pigface chronology
Crackhead: The DJ? Acucrack Remix Album (2004)	8 Bit Head: Complete Remix of Easy Listening + Other Stuff (2004)	Pigface Vs. The World (2005)

Defrag chronology
Self Construct (2002)	8 Bit Head: Complete Remix of Easy Listening + Other Stuff (2004)

8 Bit Head: Complete Remix of Easy Listening + Other Stuff is a 2004 album by Pigface and Defrag.

== Reception ==
AllMusic said that "dogs within a mile radius will be howling for half the album, and old video game systems will hear their mating call here and there". They concluded that in the end, "often the traces of Pigface are unrecognizable ... too many jokes and gimmicks make it less filling ... meth heads and speed freaks will approve, along with Sega Genesis modders and Pigface completists".

== Track listing ==
No.	Title	Length
1.	"Intro"	1:56
2.	"Insect Insect Insect Insect" (Insect)	3:01
3.	"SweetMeat" (Camplathora!!!!)	3:24
4.	"Closer to Heaven" (Light Beer Mix)	2:36
5.	"Everything" (Nothing Like Everything Mix)	3:27
6.	"Bitch" (DANCE H@x0RZ $###)	2:56
7.	"MYOB" (SUPER FAST FAST FAST)	0:06
8.	"King of P.O.S."	2:34
9.	"Closer to Heaving"	2:51
10.	"MYOB Disco Who" (Rambling Pete Mix)	2:01
11.	"Closer to Heaving" (Sounds Like Spinning British Fags Mix – daehoidaR)	2:50
12.	"MYOB" (SUPER FAST FAST)	0:31
13.	"Bitch" (Extraordinary Skipping Glitch Mix)	2:16
14.	"MYOB" (Ice Cream for Your...)	3:29
15.	"Untitled Promo Material A"	1:58
16.	"Untitled Promo Material B"	2:32
17.	"Scratches"	7:33
18.	"MIDI Junkies... Don't Smoke Carl Crack"	2:31
19.	"One Moment of Peaceful Reconciliation"	1:58
20.	"Bside – Jesus Was a Robot"	1:46
