= Meg Lee Chin =

American singer, songwriter and video producer

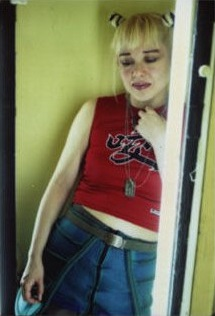

Background information
- Born: March 16, 1960 (age 66)
- Origin: Taipei, Taiwan
- Genres: Industrial music, Dark wave, Steampunk music, Alternative music
- Occupations: Musician, songwriter, sound engineer, video producer
- Instrument: Vocals
- Years active: 1993–present
- Labels: Underground, Inc., Invisible Records
- Website: megleechin.com

Meg Lee Chin is a Taiwanese American singer, songwriter, sound engineer and video producer.

She is known as an early pioneer of the home studio revolution and female-produced music. As an early adopter of computer-based audio production, she built her own PC and created "Egg Studio" with a small mixing desk and audio interfaces. Her role in the movement toward DIY record production was first recognized when she appeared as the first home studio producer to be featured in the January 2000 Millennial issue of EQ Magazine, which was the foremost high-end audio publication of its time. She also appeared in Tape Op magazine and Electronic Musician.

== Early life ==
Meg Lee Chin, whose real name is Margaret O'Leary, was born on 16 March 1960 in Taipei, Taiwan, to a US Air Force electronics engineer and a Taiwanese mother. She worked as a sound engineer while studying experimental art and video production at San Francisco State University, forming her first band, Felix Natural, during the early 1980s. Chin went on to co-found the short-lived Teknofear with Lunachicks drummer Becky Wreck and Swans guitarist Joe Goldring; frustrated with American life, she spent the late 1980s living in London, and eventually formed the all-female band Crunch.

She has been producing since her college days in San Francisco, when she produced Faith No More's first demo on her 4-track. At the time, the band featured Courtney Love on vocals.

In 1990, her home-produced music video entitled "The Ocean" was featured on MTV Europe's regular rotation. It may have been the first MTV Europe music video to be home-produced in super8 and transferred to video on a budget of £200. When asked by the producer how she managed to create a £200 video which was in his opinion "better than Duran Duran's £200,000 videos", Chin simply replied, "I've got pretty good taste". The video was later featured in an Institute of Contemporary Arts festival of film shorts.

== Music career ==
=== Crunch ===
In 1992, Crunch became the first British-based band to perform in Ukraine following the country's independence from the former U.S.S.R. This took place shortly after the period of Glasnost under Mikhail Gorbachev, and before Vladimir Putin became president of Russia. The band performed in Kyiv at the Palace "Ukraine" Concert Hall during the "Miss Rock Europe 92" festival.

They also performed the infamous women's prison in Kharkiv, Ukraine. Crunch's spirited, anthemic hard rock songs seemed to resonate with the newfound freedom of the Ukrainian public who became fascinated with the women from the west. They traveled to and were interviewed in Moscow on Russian State TV and Pravda called them "The Rock Stars from the West".

At a large press conference, the band was interrogated over questions of geo-politics. They all wanted to know the band's opinions on world affairs, but to this Chin replied "We are simply musicians and do not pretend to have the answers to delicate and complex geopolitical questions. We'll leave these answers to huge male egos like Sting". This prompted smiles from the female members of the press who began to scribble with renewed vigor in their notebooks. After the tour the band gifted their Ukrainian and Russian hosts with a DAT tape of an album's worth of their music to be distributed throughout the USSR copyright free.

=== Pigface and Invisible Records ===
In 1997, Chin began collaborating with the industrial supergroup Pigface, headed by Martin Atkins of Invisible Records. After appearing on Pigface's 1997 LP A New High in Low and their 1999 follow-up, Below the Belt, she released the solo debut Piece and Love on ex-Public Image Ltd, Ministry and Killing Joke drummer Martin Atkins' Invisible Records label. As a core member, she toured the US extensively and shared the stage with industrial music notables including Nivek Ogre (Skinny Puppy), Genesis P-Orridge, Chris Connelly (Revolting Cocks), Geordie (Killing Joke), En Esch (KMFDM), Danny Carey (Tool) and Charles Levi (My Life with the Thrill Kill Kult).

On September 28, 1999, Invisible Records released Chin's debut solo album, Piece and Love. Recorded in her Soho, London flat and produced by Martin Atkins, the album achieved critical acclaim on the darkwave, industrial underground scene and was hot-tipped in Billboard magazine's "Heatseaker" section. The track "Nutopia", which previously appeared on Pigface's A New High in Low, paints an apocalyptic vision of the future as a twist on Allen Ginsberg's poem "Howl". Other tracks have appeared on Showtime's Queer as Folk, Warner Bros. Witchblade and Sleeper Cell. An album of remixes, titled Junkies and Snakes, was released the following year again on Invisible Records. The album includes the remix track "Thing (Critter Fish Mix)". KROQ DJ Jed the Fish was a champion of Chin's work and collaborated with her during a recording session.

Chin left Invisible in 2002 but contributed tracks for Underground, Inc., an Invisible Records subsidiary, that appeared on releases such as the 2004 What's the Word, Volume One compilation, featuring Jello Biafra, Mike Ladd, among others. Other works also released on Invisible include remixed covers of Ministry, David Bowie and Dead Kennedys tracks.

=== Gearslutz ===
In 2002 she built, developed and co-created Gearslutz. Gearslutz is the largest pro-audio producer and sound engineer's forum on the web. On 18 June 2010 in the High Court of Justice#Chancery Division in London, England, Chin won a claim against her former business partner Julian Standen. After three years where she battled for her right to co-ownership of the Gearslutz business, Judge Master Justice Briggs ruled in Chin's favor for claim #HC07C03181. The settlement amount was agreed out of court.

In 2021, Chin responded to a petition where a group of women made a request for a name change to the site due to accusations of sexism. Chin surprised the audio community by revealing that she actually built the site. The name has since been changed to Gearspace. In response to interest stemming from the name change controversy and in order to provide insight into the injustices of the legal system, Chin created the Gearwarz website.

=== Music videos ===
- I Can't Pull the Trigger (2014), an anti‑war video questioning international conventions on warfare and depicting refusal to participate in violence.
- England’s Mask (2018), addressing British land ownership, financialisation, and the monarchy’s symbolic role in discussions of inequality.
- Celebrity Saviour (2019), a satirical exploration of celebrity culture, media influence, and political polarisation.
- Venus (in Brown Sheets) (2019), which draws on Venus as a symbol of love and compassion. According to the artist, feminism “was never supposed to be about power in the masculine sense,” and the work suggests that inner strength, compassion, and humanity, rather than ambition or accolades, reflect a more authentic approach to female empowerment, contrasting these ideals with conflict and aggressive social structures.
- Lucy (2025), which explores tensions between human creativity and machine‑driven culture, reflecting on mechanisation, emotional authenticity, and cultural displacement in the face of automation.

== Documentary films ==
In 2019, she created a political documentary/cartoon entitled England's Mask which expands upon the song of the same name. The video demonstrates why Britain is in danger of losing its status as global creative leaders in street art, fashion and pop music. Solutions include an unconditional basic income, land tax, and legal reform. Chin proposes the democratization of money printing by transferring money printing powers away from central banks.

The film was screened at the "Hack the Economy" event at the Bookery Gallerie on 16 June 2022. The event included a Q&A and discussion hosted by art curator Manick Govinda. It was also shown as part of a screening titled "England's Mask – An Artist's Vision" on 3 June 2019. A review titled "Why England’s Mask Matters Now: A Critical Review" was published on the Temple of Ideas website in December 2025.

== Political art ==
Her music and videos are often politically themed and fully self‑produced—she writes, records, performs vocals, plays most instruments, and produces all tracks and videos—reflecting a long‑standing independent, DIY practice outside label or corporate structures. Her work addresses subjects including economic inequality, contemporary debates around feminism, political authority, and social disengagement, frequently exploring these themes through creativity and individual agency.

=== Word Drops ===
Chin created a genre called "Word Drops" which are short spoken word and commentary pieces, often of a political nature and mixed with an assortment of beats and sound effects.

== Personal life ==
She continues to release music; her most recent single, "Lucy" (2025), is described by ReGen Magazine as exploring the tension between human emotion and technological rationality, or "heart versus mind," in response to the growing mechanisation of society and the increasing influence of artificial intelligence.

Chin publishes opinion essays and blog posts on her website and Substack, covering politics, economics, technology, and culture. She has contributed articles to Country Squire Magazine.

== Discography ==
=== Albums ===
- Piece and Love (1999)
- Junkies and Snakes (2000)

=== EPs and singles ===
- Altered States of Amerika (2020)
- "Lucy" (2025)

=== Chart performance ===
The album appeared on college radio charts in the U.S., including:

- CMJ Radio 200 – #60
- Core Radio Chart – #51
- RPM chart – #38

=== Music videos ===
Tracklist:

1. Venus (in Brown Sheets)
2. Celebrity Saviour
3. I Can't Pull the Trigger
4. England's Mask
5. Bowies Heroes - A Tribute
6. Crunch "Burning Down the Walls" at the Palace Ukraine

=== Political documentary/parody ===
Tracklist:

1. England's Mask - the Full Documentary
2. Wish You Were Here - Free Julian Assange London Rally w/ Pink Floyd's Roger Waters
3. Anna Soubry and the Parliamentary Backtracker's Rap

=== Word drops ===
Tracklist:

1. The United States of Europe featuring The Football Factory author John King
2. Hastings featuring poet Salena Godden
