= Tamara Witmer =

American model and actress (born 1984)

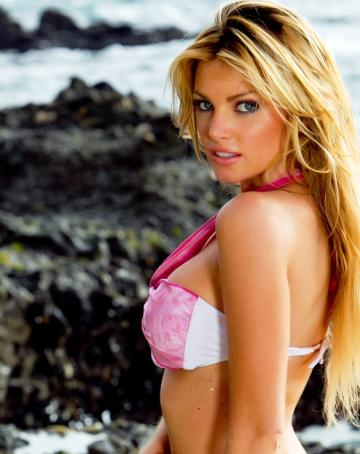

Playboy centerfold appearance
- August 2005
- Preceded by: Qiana Chase
- Succeeded by: Vanessa Hoelsher

Personal details
- Born: Tamara Lynn Witmer; March 21, 1984 (age 42) Valencia, Santa Clarita, California, United States
- Height: 5 ft 8 in (1.73 m)

Tamara Witmer (born March 21, 1984) is an American model, actress and reality television star. She is best known for her appearance as Playboy's, Miss August 2005, Playmate of the Month and as the cover girl for the October 2006, issue of Playboy magazine.

== Modeling career ==
Witmer's career started in the early 2000s, when she began appearing on various magazine covers including; FHM, Glamour and Muscle and Fitness. She also appeared as a centerfold inside issues of; Maxim, Sports Illustrated, Stuff and Vanity Fair.

In 2005, Witmer took part in the Lingerie Bowl, during the half-time show of the Super Bowl XXXIX, she was a tackle player for the Los Angeles Temptation. She then posed for Playboy and became Playboy's, Playmate of the Month in August 2005. In 2006, she was the cover girl for the October issue of Playboy magazine. In 2007, she was featured in the Playboy Playmate 2007 Video Calendar as Miss May.

She posed regularly for Benchwarmer trading cards between the years of 2006–2010. In 2008 and 2009, she was one of the featured models in the calendar for fastdates.com. In 2010, she was the cover girl for the March, digital issue, of Fast Lane magazine.

== Television career ==
In 2006, Witmer appeared on Deal or No Deal, as a briefcase model. In 2007, Witmer was a contestant on the first season of the hit VH1 celebreality series, Rock of Love with Bret Michaels, where she was eliminated in the second episode, infamously exiting the show through the wrong door. In 2009, she was a contestant on the second season of the VH1 celebreality spin-off, I Love Money, she was eliminated in the first episode, exiting the mansion through the wrong door again. In 2013, she appeared in two episodes of the dating show, The Millionaire Matchmaker.

She appeared in numerous films including; Supergator, Taken and The Ugly Truth.

== Filmography ==
Film and television
Year	Title	Role	Notes
2005	Lingerie Bowl	Los Angeles Temptation	TV special
2006	Deal or No Deal	Self; briefcase model	8 episodes
2006	Playboy Playmate Video Calendar 2007	Miss May	Direct to DVD
2007	Supergator	Gigi	
2007	Rock of Love with Bret Michaels season 1	Self; contestant	13th place, 4 episodes
2008	Taken	Prostitute #1	Uncredited
2009	I Love Money season 2	Self; contestant	19th place, 1 episode
2009	Baby O	Theresa	Direct to DVD
2009	The Ugly Truth	Salsa dancer	Uncredited
2010	Rock of Love Girls: Where Are They Now	Self; feature	TV special
2010	Badass!	Self; contestant	1 episode
2010	LA's The Place Magazine	Self; guest host	Web series, 1 episode
2013	The Millionaire Matchmaker	Self; contestant	2 episodes

Music videos
Year	Title	Artist	Role
2003	The Eminem Show	Eminem	
2008	Rock N Roll Jesus	Kid Rock	

Destiny Davis	Amber Campisi	Jillian Grace	Courtney Rachel Culkin	Jamie Westenhiser	Kara Monaco
Qiana Chase	Tamara Witmer	Vanessa Hoelsher	Amanda Paige	Raquel Gibson	Christine Smith
