= Bedazzled (1967 film) =

1967 British film by Stanley Donen

- Theatrical release poster by Tom Chantrell
- Directed by: Stanley Donen
- Screenplay by: Peter Cook
- Story by: Peter Cook; Dudley Moore
- Produced by: Stanley Donen
- Starring: Peter Cook; Dudley Moore; Eleanor Bron; Raquel Welch
- Cinematography: Austin Dempster
- Edited by: Richard Marden
- Music by: Dudley Moore
- Production company: Stanley Donen Enterprises
- Distributed by: 20th Century Fox
- Release dates: 10 December 1967 (New York City); 21 December 1967 (London)
- Running time: 103 minutes
- Country: United Kingdom
- Language: English
- Budget: $770,000
- Box office: $1.5 million (US and Canada rentals)

Bedazzled is a 1967 British DeLuxe Color fantasy comedy film produced and directed by Stanley Donen in Panavision format. It was written by comedian Peter Cook and stars both Cook and his comedy partner Dudley Moore. It is a comic retelling of the Faust legend, set in the Swinging London of the 1960s. In the film, the Devil (Cook) offers an unhappy young man (Moore) seven wishes in return for his soul, but twists the spirit of the wishes to frustrate the man's hopes.

== Plot ==
Stanley Moon, a short-order cook in a Wimpy restaurant in London, is infatuated with waitress Margaret Spencer, but is too shy to approach her. Distraught, he attempts suicide by hanging but is interrupted by George Spiggot, a man claiming to be the Devil. In return for his soul, George offers Stanley seven wishes. When Stanley accuses George of being delusional, he offers Stanley a "trial wish". Stanley wishes for a raspberry ice lolly, and George takes him to buy one from a nearby shop. Finding it melted, Stanley confirms that George is the Devil.

George's heightened sense of pride caused God to expel him from Heaven, and they are now in a game: If George is first to claim 100 billion souls, he will be readmitted to Heaven. His staff of seven deadly sins, especially Lust and Envy, are helping him with minor acts of vandalism and spite to reach this goal. Agreeing to the deal, Stanley uses his wishes to try to satisfy his love for Margaret, but George twists his words to frustrate him. Whenever he blows a raspberry, Stanley undoes the effects of a wish.

1. Stanley first wishes to be more articulate. George turns him into a talkative intellectual. Margaret becomes equally pretentious and agrees with all of Stanley's beliefs. When Stanley makes his move, however, she is horrified and starts screaming "Rape!".
2. Stanley wishes to be a multi-millionaire with Margaret as his "very physical" wife. She ignores him and his lavish gifts, including the original Mona Lisa, instead being physically affectionate with other men.
3. Stanley wishes to be a pop singer. His song "Love Me" is a huge hit before instantly being outdone by the narcissistic, emotionally unavailable Drimble Wedge and the Vegetation, whose monotone "Bedazzled" hypnotizes Margaret and the other groupies into abandoning Stanley.
4. Stanley comments in passing that he wishes he were "a fly on the wall" and George turns them both into literal flies on the wall in a morgue, where a police inspector shows Margaret various dead bodies, hoping that she will identify one as Stanley. When the inspector invites Margaret to a vice squad party, Stanley launches an attack on him, only to be felled with bug spray.
5. Stanley wishes he and Margaret lived a quiet life in the countryside with children. However, Margaret becomes another man's wife. While deeply in love, Stanley and Margaret's attempt to consummate their affection drives both into emotional agony.
6. Determined to frame a wish that George cannot ruin for him, Stanley wishes that he and Margaret loved one another, lived away from the city with no other men around, and would always be together. George turns him into a nun of the Order of Saint Beryl, or the Leaping Beryllians, who glorify their founder by jumping on trampolines. (Note: Expanding on a sketch that previously appeared in Cook and Moore's TV series Not Only... But Also.) Margaret is also a nun there, but refuses to consider consummating their love, as they are both women. Stanley attempts to escape the wish by blowing a raspberry, to no effect, and returns to London to confront George.
7. When Stanley tries to use his seventh wish, George reveals he has already used it — his trial wish for an ice lolly.

Ultimately, George spares Stanley eternal damnation, because he exceeded his quota of 100 billion souls and can afford to be generous. George ascends to Heaven, where God's disembodied voice rejects him again; when he gave Stanley back his soul, George did the right thing with the wrong motive. Thinking he can nullify this by reclaiming Stanley's soul, George tries to stop Stanley from burning his contract, but arrives too late.

Back at the restaurant, Stanley, now back to normal, asks Margaret to dinner; despite saying she is busy, she suggests meeting another night, and Stanley smiles. George tries to entice Stanley again, but Stanley says he would rather start a relationship with Margaret his own way. Frustrated, George leaves and threatens revenge on God by unleashing all the tawdry and shallow technological curses of the modern age while God laughs triumphantly.

== Cast ==
- Peter Cook as George Spiggot / The Devil
- Dudley Moore as Stanley Moon
- Eleanor Bron as Margaret Spencer
- Raquel Welch as Lust / Lilian Lust
- Alba as Vanity
- Robert Russell as Anger
- Barry Humphries as Envy
- Parnell McGarry as Gluttony
- Danièle Noël as Avarice
- Howard Goorney as Sloth
- Michael Bates as Inspector Clarke
- Bernard Spear as Irving Moses
- Robin Hawdon as Randolph, harp teacher
- Michael Trubshawe as Lord Dowdy
- Evelyn Moore as Mrs Wisby
- Charles Lloyd Pack as Vicar
- Lockwood West as St Peter
- Betty Cooper as Sister Phoebe
- Valentine Dyall as the voice of God (uncredited)

== Soundtrack ==
Moore wrote the film's soundtrack, which was performed by the Dudley Moore Trio. The title track, Moore's best known song, was performed within the movie by the fictional psychedelic rock band Drimble Wedge and the Vegetation, featuring Cook's character as the vocalist. The piece has since been covered widely, including by Tony Hatch, Nick Cave and The Love Interest. Moore recorded several instrumental versions.

== Novelisation ==
In 1968, Sphere Books published a novelisation written by Michael J. Bird based on the screenplay by Cook and Moore.

== Release ==
Bedazzled was released on 10 December 1967 at the Plaza Theater in New York City and on 21 December 1967 at the Carlton Theatre in London.

== Critical reception ==
Upon its release, reviews for Bedazzled were mixed. Writing for The New York Times, Bosley Crowther called it a "pretentiously metaphorical picture" which becomes "awfully precious and monotonous and eventually ... fags out in sheer bad taste." Crowther does, however, compliment Donen for his "colorful and graphic" mise-en-scène. Roger Ebert’s review for the Chicago Sun-Times was far more genteel, comparing the film's humour to that of Bob and Ray. Ebert enthusiastically called Bedazzled's satire "barbed and contemporary ... dry and understated," and overall, a "magnificently photographed, intelligent, very funny film".

A January 1968 review in The Monthly Film Bulletin panned the film, saying, "'Script by Peter Cook, based on an idea by Peter Cook and Dudley Moore.' Well, it wasn't much of an idea in the first place and distinctly shop-soiled at that, but even the Faust legend still has more life in it than this tired farrago. The story is used simply as a series of pegs on which to hang sketches by Dud, Pete and Eleanor Bron, all of whom appear in virtually every scene. The wit is strictly fourth-form: 'Don't you know suicide is a criminal offence? You could be hanged for it,' says Spiggott when he finds Stanley rope in hand, after his unsuccessful attempt on his own life. The dialogue also has an embarrassing preoccupation with the Deity and keeps making pussyfooted little dabs at blasphemy like a naughty choirboy putting out his tongue at the vicar. The feebleness of the script would matter less if the performances were on a higher level, but the principals appear to have been given their heads and there is no sign of any control by director Stanley Donen The result, inevitably, is self-indulgent, amateurish and dull, and the one genuinely hilarious moment – three nuns on a trampoline – is repeated from an old television show. Perhaps the kindest thing is to put this one down to experience and hope that next time ambition will not run so far ahead of ability."

In a retrospective review from 1989, Leslie Halliwell wrote that Bedazzled was a "camped-up version of Faust which resolves itself into a series of threadbare sketches for the stars. All rather desperate apart from the leaping nuns." In the 1990s, The Virgin Film Guide said, "Cook and Moore brilliantly shift from character to character with just a change of voice (not unlike Peter Sellers), and the movie never flags". The Time Out Film Guide 2009 describes the film as a "hit and miss affair" which is "good fun sometimes", but suffers from a "threadbare" plot.

In the 2010s, The Radio Times Guide to Films gave the film three out of five stars, writing: "From the days when London was swinging and Peter Cook and Dudley Moore were a partnership made in comedy heaven, this Faustian fantasy has Dud as a cook lusting after waitress Eleanor Bron and being granted seven wishes by Pete, as a drawlingly engaging Devil hungry for Dud's soul. A briefly clad, briefly glimpsed Raquel Welch is one of the Deadly Sins, while Barry Humphries turns in a hilarious performance as Envy. Director Stanley Donen settles for quirky comedy instead of razor-sharp satire."

On the review aggregator website Rotten Tomatoes, Bedazzled holds an approval rating of 74% based on 38 reviews, with an average rating of 7.6/10.

== Remake ==
In 2000, 20th Century Fox released an American remake of the same name, featuring Brendan Fraser as Elliot Richards (counterpart to Moore's role) and Elizabeth Hurley as the Devil.
