= Gearspace =

Music production website

Gearspace.com
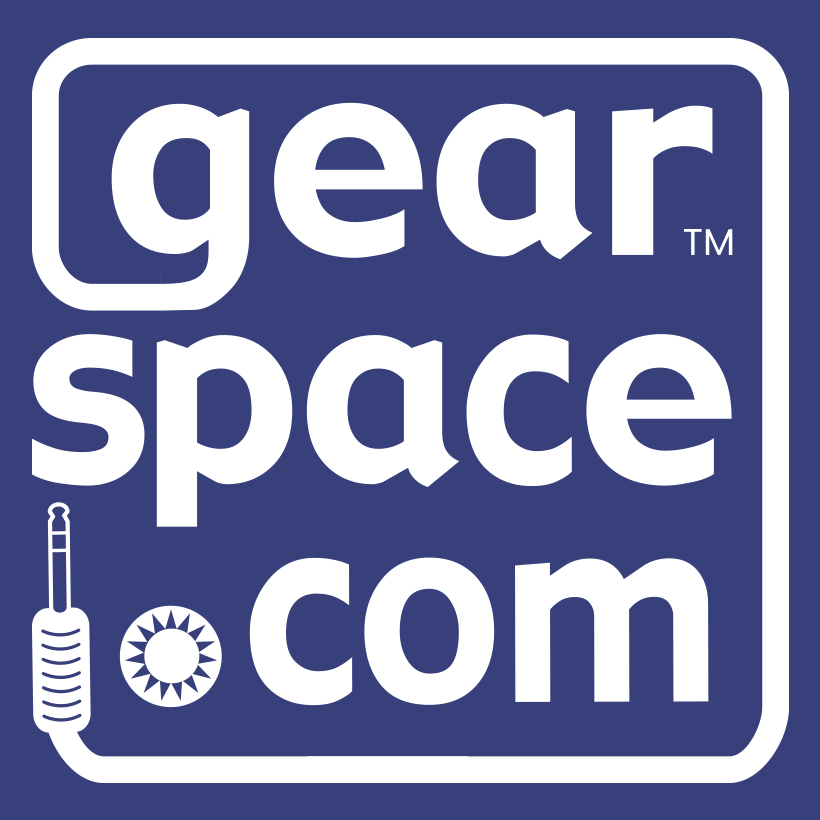
- Company type: Private Company
- Industry: Music Production
- Founded: 1 April 2002; 24 years ago
- Headquarters: London, UK
- Area served: Worldwide
- Website: https://gearspace.com/

Gearspace is a website and forum dedicated to audio engineering. Gearspace is one of the largest resources for pro audio information, with over 1.6 million monthly visitors from 218 countries. Originally established in 2002 as Gearslutz, the site rebranded in March 2021.

== History ==
In 2002, Julian Standen and Meg Lee Chin, both musicians and audio engineers, created the site, which is widely regarded as a top online resource for music production knowledge and discussion. The site has been described as the "best place … for help with your interface, DAW, signal path, or just about anything else."

In 2018, the website was ranked by Alexa.com as the 7,360th most popular website in the world. In 2020, it had over 1.6 million monthly visitors from 218 countries.

== Behringer Lawsuit ==
In mid-2017, Music Tribe, the parent company of music equipment manufacturer Behringer, pursued legal action against synthesizer manufacturer Dave Smith Instruments (DSI) and a number of the website's forum participants, including a DSI employee, for defamation over various statements made in forum discussions that alleged that Behringer copies other companies' products and exhibits other questionable business practices.

== Name change ==
On January 6, 2021, a forum user started an online petition at Change.org encouraging the website to change its name from Gearslutz. Site co-founder Standen announced later the same month that the site would be undergoing a name change, stating "the word-play pun in the name has gotten old and it is now time to move forward".

On March 29, 2021, Standen confirmed that the site would be renamed "Gearspace.com".
