= The Best of Pigface: Preaching to the Perverted =

The Best of Pigface Preaching to the Perverted

Greatest hits album by Pigface
- Released: 2001
- Genre: Industrial
- Label: Invisible Records

Pigface chronology
Eat Shit You Fucking Redneck (1998)	The Best of Pigface Preaching to the Perverted (2001)	Easy Listening... (2003)

Professional ratings
Review scores
Source	Rating
AllMusic	4.5/5 stars

The Best of Pigface Preaching to the Perverted is a two-disc greatest hits album by Pigface, released in 2001.

== Track listing ==
Disc 1
No.	Title	Length
1.	"Intro"	0:07
2.	"Kiss King"	4:30
3.	"Nutopia"	4:50
4.	"Think" (Addiction / Salvation Mix)	3:15
5.	"Asphole"	5:01
6.	"Divebomber"	4:19
7.	"Chikasaw"	6:01
8.	"Steamroller"	2:10
9.	"Hagseed"	2:32
10.	"Cutting Face"	4:12
11.	"Fuck It Up" (Did You Ever Get the Feeling?)	3:42
12.	"Alle Ist Mein"	2:30
13.	"Ten Ground and Down"	4:26
14.	"Seven Words"	1:27
15.	"Satellite"	4:11
16.	"Hips, Tits, Lips, Power!"	4:18
17.	"Suck"	3:40
18.	"Point Blank"	2:37
19.	"Empathy"	3:55
20.	"I Can Do No Wrong"	5:19
Total length:		73:02

Disc 2
No.	Title	Length
1.	"Martin Interview"	2:45
2.	"Dribble"	4:16
3.	"Spanish Lesson" (Mix 3)	3:35
4.	"Chickasaurus"	5:04
5.	"Sickaspfuck" (Full Gimball #1 Club Mix)	4:59
6.	"Lost Track"	2:59
7.	"Taiko" (Which became "Asphole")	4:23
8.	"Cold" (Mickey #2)	5:57
9.	"Ogre" (& The Six Million Dollar Man)	2:06
10.	"Dog"	3:08
11.	"Hips, Tits, Lips, Power!" (Britishit Mix)	3:30
12.	"Radio ID Fuck Ups"	0:50
13.	"Mickey #1"	4:54
14.	"War Ich Nicht / Amphetaminethamphetamine / Girls Are Cool" (Live)	6:40
15.	"You Know, You Know, You Know"	4:18
Total length:		59:35
