= Welcome to Mexico... Asshole =

1992 album

Live album by Pigface
- Released: 1992
- Recorded: April – June 1991
- Genre: Industrial
- Length: 72:47
- Label: Invisible
- Producer: Martin Atkins

Pigface chronology
Gub (1991)	Welcome to Mexico... Asshole (1992)	Fook (1992)

Professional ratings
Review scores
Source	Rating
Allmusic	3/5 stars

Welcome to Mexico... Asshole is the first live album from Pigface.

== Track listing ==
No.	Title	Credit	Length
1.	"The Love Serenade" (I Hate You?)	Eric Pounder, Matthew Schultz	11:59
2.	"Blood and Sand"	Martin Atkins, Chris Connelly, Bill Rieflin, Matthew Schultz	3:05
3.	"Peaking Too Early"	Martin Atkins, Chris Connelly, Ogilvie, Dave Ogilvie, Paul Raven, Bill Rieflin, Matthew Schultz, William Tucker	1:41
4.	"Little Sisters"	Martin Atkins, Chris Connelly, Bill Rieflin, William Tucker	3:35
5.	"Twice Removed"	Martin Atkins, Chris Connelly, Ogilvie, Dave Ogilvie, Paul Raven, Bill Rieflin, Matthew Schultz, William Tucker	2:44
6.	"Beneath My Feet"	Martin Atkins, Dave Ogilvie, Paul Raven, Bill Rieflin, Matthew Schultz, William Tucker	7:33
7.	"Point Blank"	Martin Atkins, Chris Connelly, Bill Rieflin	4:22
8.	"Stowaway"	Chris Connelly, Jessica Villines, Stuart Zechman	5:35
9.	"Suck"	Martin Atkins, Paul Barker, Chris Connelly, Trent Reznor, Bill Rieflin	5:01
10.	"Weightless"	Martin Atkins, Chris Connelly, Ogilvie, Dave Ogilvie, Paul Raven, Bill Rieflin, Matthew Schultz, William Tucker	5:01
11.	"T.F.W.O."	Crompton, Goettel, Dave Ogilvie	4:36
12.	"Lash/Herb/Taxi"	Martin Atkins, Chris Connelly, Ogilvie, Dave Ogilvie, Paul Raven, Bill Rieflin, Matthew Schultz, William Tucker	5:19
13.	"Tapeworm"	Martin Atkins, Dave Ogilvie, Bill Rieflin	6:52
14.	"The Breakfast Conspiracy"	Martin Atkins, Dave Ogilvie, Paul Raven, Bill Rieflin, Matthew Schultz, William Tucker	5:16

== Tour Personnel ==
- Martin Atkins - drums
- Bill Rieflin - drums
- Chris Connelly - vocals
- Nivek Ogre - vocals
- Paul Raven - bass
- Matthew Schultz - guitar, keyboards
- William Tucker - guitar

With help from: Paul Barker, Bart Flores, Eric Pounder, Beefcake The Mighty, Marston Daley, Michael Balch, Tom Lash, Joe Trump, Black Francis, Mary Byker, Roberto Santiago, Chris Vrenna, Neil Hubbard, Bobby Rea, Andy MaGuire, Evil Mothers, Jeff Ward, Dave Kendricks, En Esch, Becky Wreck, Silverfish, Trent Reznor, John Wills and David Yow.
