= Rock of Love with Bret Michaels season 1 =

Rock of Love with Bret Michaels
- Season 1
- The cast of Rock of Love (4 not pictured)
- Starring: Bret Michaels
- No. of episodes: 13

Release
- Original network: VH1
- Original release: July 15 – October 7, 2007

Season chronology
- Next → Season 2

Rock of Love with Bret Michaels is a competition-driven reality television series starring Bret Michaels, the lead singer of the band Poison. The 12-episode series, which premiered July 15, 2007 on VH1 (a VSPOT online premiere showcased on July 10), was created by Cris Abrego and Mark Cronin (co-founders of the production company 51 Minds).

== Overview ==
Filmed at locations in and around Los Angeles, Las Vegas and Cabo San Lucas, Mexico, each episode covers events of one or two days and ends in the elimination of one or more contestants. Although not a direct spin-off, Rock of Love with Bret Michaels clearly takes its name and inspiration from Flavor of Love starring '80s rap star Flavor Flav.

Rock of Love's storyline revolves around twenty women and the conflict that arises as they compete against each other to prove that they have the potential to be Michael’s perfect "Rock Star Girlfriend." Michaels and the contestants stay in the same house used for the Los Angeles location of the American television reality show America's Next Top Model cycle 5. The contestants participate in various physical and social challenges that are occasionally judged by industry greats such as Don Was and Richard Blade.

== Contestants ==
Name	Hometown	Eliminated!
Jes Rickleff	Naperville, Illinois	Winner
Heather Chadwell	Columbus, Ohio	Runner-Up
Lacey Conner	Dallas, Texas	Episode 10
Brandi Mahon	Buffalo, New York	Episode 9
Samantha Weisberg	Brooklyn, New York	Episode 8
Mia Tidwell	Crest Hill, Illinois	Episode 7
Magdalena Widz	Poland/Palatine, Illinois	Episode 6
Erin Shattuck	Bloomington, Illinois	Episode 5
Brandi Cunningham	Franklin Lakes, New Jersey	Episode 4
Cindy Steedle (Rodeo)	Newnan, Georgia	Episode 4
Dallas Harrison	Houston, Texas	Episode 3
Kristia "Bonita" Krueger	Hudson, Wisconsin	Episode 3
Tamara Witmer	Valencia, California	Episode 2
Faith Rorrer	Beckley, West Virginia	Episode 2
Tawny Amber Young	Orange County, California	Episode 2
Tiffany Carmona	Orland Park, Illinois	Episode 2
Bonnie Giuliano	Rockaway, New Jersey	Episode 1
Lauren Petticrew	Zionsville, Indiana	Episode 1
Jessica Starkman	Elk Grove, Illinois	Episode 1
Krista Simonsen	Bountiful, Utah	Episode 1
Raven Williams	New Orleans, Louisiana	Episode 1
Meredith Plavidal	Eugene, Oregon	Episode 1
Kimberly Fragipane	Arlington, New Jersey	Episode 1
Kelly Munroe	Chicago, Illinois	Episode 1
Pam McGarvey	Levittown, Pennsylvania	Episode 1

== Elimination order ==
Bret's Call-out Order
#	Contestants	Episodes										
#	Contestants	1	2	3	4	5	6	7	8	9	10	12
1	Bonnie	Rodeo	Rodeo	Brandi M.	Mia	Jes	Brandi M.	Jes	Heather	Jes	Jes	Jes
2	Brandi C.	Heather	Jes	Jes	Jes	Mia	Heather	Heather	Jes	Lacey	Heather	Heather
3	Brandi M.	Jes	Lacey	Heather	Erin	Brandi M.	Jes	Samantha	Brandi M.	Heather	Lacey	
4	Dallas	Samantha	Mia	Rodeo	Brandi M.	Lacey	Mia	Brandi M.	Lacey	Brandi M.		
5	Erin	Magdalena	Magdalena	Brandi C.	Magdalena	Magdalena	Lacey	Lacey	Samantha			
6	Faith	Brandi M.	Dallas	Erin	Samantha	Samantha	Samantha	Mia				
7	Heather	Faith	Samantha	Mia	Lacey	Heather	Magdalena					
8	Jes	Tamara	Brandi M.	Magdalena	Heather	Erin						
9	Jessica	Mia	Brandi C.	Samantha	Brandi C.							
10	Kelly	Erin	Kristia	Lacey	Rodeo							
11	Kimberly	Dallas	Heather	Dallas								
12	Krista	Tawny	Erin	Kristia								
13	Kristia	Lacey	Tamara									
14	Lacey	Kristia	Faith									
15	Lauren	Brandi C.	Tiffany									
16	Magdalena	Tiffany	Tawny									
17	Meredith	Bonnie										
18	Mia	Lauren										
19	Pam	Jessica										
20	Raven	Raven										
21	Rodeo	Krista										
22	Samantha	Pam										
23	Tamara	Kelly										
24	Tawny	Kimberly										
25	Tiffany	Meredith										

The contestant won the competition.
The contestant won a solo date with Bret.
The contestant won a group date with Bret.
The contestant won a date with Bret, but was eliminated.
The contestant was called down first, but was eliminated before the elimination ceremony began.
The contestant was eliminated.
The contestant was supposed to be eliminated outside the house and did not receive a pass, but was allowed to stay.
The contestant was eliminated outside the house.

- Episode 11 was a recap episode

== Episodes ==
=== Don't Threaten Me With a Good Time ===
First aired July 15, 2007 (1.6M viewers)

Bret Michaels shows up on a motorcycle and welcomes the 25 female competitors. He then introduces Big John, his head of security. After Bret leaves Big John eliminates Pam, Kimberly, Meredith, Kelly, and Tiffany. He then invites the rest of the girls inside.

Meanwhile, inside the house the women are enjoying themselves and two of the blondes, Brandi C. and Kristia, decide to be the "Barbie Twins". While the girls are enjoying their cocktails, Tiffany comes pounding on the door begging Big John to let her in. He finally lets her through to the party. Bret then takes pictures of the women, and some girls go over the top. Tiffany, for one, is a drunken mess and her pictures look like mugshots, and a 32-year-old stripper, Heather, shows her boobs. Bret tries to meet as many women as possible. He pays little attention to Brandi C., to her chagrin, until she appears in her friend's bathing suit. Tiffany, who appears drunk, gets into a fight with some of the other women.

During elimination, Bret selects the women who may stay in the house by giving them a backstage pass personalized with their photo. Bret gives his first pass to Rodeo, followed by Heather, Jes, Sam, Brandi M., Magdalena, Faith, Tamara, Mia, Erin, Dallas, Tawny, Lacey, and Kristia. Brandi C. finally receives her pass and Bret also allows Tiffany to stay. Jessica, Bonnie, Lauren, Krista, and Raven are eliminated.

- Bottom 7: Brandi C., Tiffany, Jessica, Bonnie, Lauren, Krista, Raven
- Eliminated: Bonnie, Lauren, Krista, Raven, Jessica
- Eliminated: Tiffany (Bret allowed to stay)
- Reasons for Eliminations:
  - Pam, Kimberly, Meredith, Kelly: Was eliminated before entering the house. Tiffany was also eliminated as well, but was given a chance to stay.
  - Krista, Jessica, Bonnie: Didn't get time to know them.
  - Lauren: Felt she was too innocent and didn't know why she was there.
  - Raven: Didn't feel a connection as she talks too much.

=== Talk Dirty To Me ===
First aired July 22, 2007

Another party starts at the house. Erin mentions that she had a boyfriend and was supposed to get married this year. Some women begin an impromptu musical jam and then a live music stripper show. Lacey pulls Jes into the pool, which infuriates Jes. Lacey argues with Dallas about the treatment and rights of animals.

The women participate in a phone sex competition. Bret is hooked up to a penile plethysmograph, a device that measures the blood flow to the penis. Rodeo, Erin, and Lacey rate the best results and win a date with Bret. Faith, Tiffany, and Tamara rate the worst results. The date is a trip to Jim Henson Studios, where the women record parts to complete a song Bret is recording with producer Don Was. Erin seems to connect the most with Bret using her sexual moans to seduce him.

Back at the house Brandi C. argues with Erin. Erin comments on Brandi C.'s "meth-scratched face," which Brandi C. says is actually the result of a car accident. Brandi C. complains to Bret about the incident.

Heather tells Bret that Erin is engaged and is supposed to be married soon. Erin explains to Bret that she was previously engaged. Erin and Heather then argue in front of Bret, pissing him off.

At elimination Rodeo once again receives the first pass. Erin gets the last pass. Tawny, Tamara, Faith, and Tiffany are eliminated.

- Challenge: Phone Sex Competition
- Challenge Winners: Erin, Lacey, Rodeo
- Bottom 5: Erin, Tawny, Tamara, Tiffany, Faith
- Eliminated: Tawny, Tamara, Tiffany, Faith
- Reasons for Eliminations:
  - Tawny: Didn't have much of a connection as she was "lost in the shuffle".
  - Tamara: Couldn't connect with her, feeling she was a waste.
  - Tiffany: Gave her a chance in the beginning, but failed to make an impression.
  - Faith: Had no connection with her.

=== Motocross ===
First aired July 29, 2007

The women have formed in-house alliances (good girls vs. bad girls) and now must compete against one another in a motocross relay race. After a few lessons from nine-time national motocross champion Mercedes Gonzales and professional mx instructor Charity Okerson, the women are ready to ride. Bret chooses Magdalena, Heather and Erin as captains. They in turn choose their relay teammates.

Heather’s team (Lacey, Kristia, and Dallas) gets off to a rough start. Lacey cannot handle her bike and stalls out, then Dallas hits a bump which sends her flying. Erin’s team (Mia, Jes, and Brandi C.) ride without mishap, but Magdalena’s team (Rodeo, Brandi M., and Sam) wins the relay and shared dates with Bret.

Tension between Lacey and Dallas escalates on the drive home. Lacey uses her animal rights viewpoint to antagonize Dallas. Dallas calls her a hypocrite, citing the fact that Bret wears leather and snakeskin. The bickering continues at the house, with Lacey trying to antagonize Dallas into violence. Rodeo finally pulls Lacey off Dallas.

Magdalena, Sam and Bret takes place in a private outdoor screening room. They watch a documentary on Bret's life. Bret gets more intimate with both women, kissing each in turn. Sam is hesitant at first, but then confesses to wanting an orgasm after kissing him.

The next day, Bret takes Rodeo and Brandi M on an afternoon date. They visit designer Ashley Paige’s shop where the two women are treated to custom-tailored bikinis. During lunch, Rodeo mentions the fight between Lacey and Dallas. Brandi M. becomes annoyed that Rodeo dominated the conversation, and Rodeo is put off by Brandi M.’s bodily noises. Returning home, Bret has to deal with the tussle between Lacey and Dallas.

At elimination time, Kristia and Dallas are sent home. Dallas refuses to give Bret a hug and flips him off.

- Challenge: Motocross Race
- Challenge Winners: Magdalena, Rodeo, Sam, Brandi M.
- Bottom 3: Lacey, Dallas, Kristia
- Eliminated: Dallas, Kristia
- Reasons for Eliminations:
  - Kristia: Didn't get to spend a lot of time with her.
  - Dallas: Had to separate her and Lacey from each other after their fight, and picked Lacey due to his stronger connection with her.

=== Riff It Good ===
First aired August 5, 2007

Episode Four features a competition to tests the women's lyric-writing capabilities. The opening scene begins immediately after Episode Three's elimination. Brandi C. tells the cameras that she is upset because Kristia was just eliminated. The remaining women celebrate, but Rodeo realizes she misses her 7-year-old son. Emotionally fragile, she leaves the party in tears. Bret consoles her, but she remains vulnerable.

The women are paired up and told that they are to compose lyrics for a track from Bret's solo album (a ballad or a rock song), which they will perform for the two judges: Bret and radio personality Richard Blade. The winning team gets a date with Bret.

Lacey and Erin choose the ballad. Lacey sings while Erin fearfully plays the tambourine. Heather and Magdalena sing and dance together. Jes and Brandi M. shout-sing a punky version of the rock song using electric guitars as props. Mia and Rodeo's rock song lyrics reflect Rodeo's desire to see her son. Sam and Brandi C. perform their brooding lyrics. The judges confer, and Heather and Magdalena's and Sam and Brandi C.'s team tie.

Heather and Magdalena are taken for sushi at The Geisha House, where Bret presents each with an electric guitar. Bret pays more attention to Heather stating that he thinks Heather could be the one. They arrive back at the house to find a party in progress. Heather joins in the fun, dancing topless. The scene ends as Lacey, Brandi C., and Heather are seen piling onto Bret on his bed.

The next morning, the other women discuss the three who spent the night in Bret's room. A rumor is spread around that Lacey gave Bret oral sex. Sam is disappointed that her date feels cheapened and considers going home. A hungover Bret arrives to take Sam and Brandi C. on their Paramount Ranch picnic lunch date. Bret presents them with acoustic guitars. Sam discusses her trust issues privately with Bret. She decides to remain in the house.

Breaking format, Bret surprisingly eliminates Rodeo first. He tells her she needs to go to be with her son and gives her his custom-made cowboy hat as a parting gift. Bret then starts to get down to business and gives Mia the first pass. Jes receives her pass followed by Erin, Brandi M., Magdalena, Sam, Lacey, and Heather. Brandi C. is eliminated.

- Challenge: Album Covers
- Challenge Winners: Heather & Magdalena and Brandi C. & Sam (tie)
- Bottom 3: Lacey, Heather, Brandi C.
- Eliminated: Rodeo (Before Elimination), Brandi C.
- Reasons for Eliminations:
  - Rodeo: After getting emotional for missing her son, Bret made the hard decision to let Rodeo go to see her son. He also felt Rodeo could not handle being there long enough and let her go before eliminations.
  - Brandi C.: Felt she was a free spirit and wanted more of an actual relationship with her instead of a sexual one.

=== First Annual Bret's Mudbowl ===
First aired August 12, 2007

This week's challenge is a football competition in the mud. The teams are The Sweethearts (Jes, Magdalena, Mia and Brandi M.) and The Fallen Angels (Heather, Samantha, Lacey and Erin). The most valuable player of the game gets to go out on a one-on-one date with Bret, while the rest of the winning team goes on a group date with Bret. Lacey injures her ankle on the field when tackled by Jes. Team Sweethearts win the competition, and Jes is named most valuable player.

During Jes's date, Bret plays a song that he wrote. Jes says that she feels that she can let her guard down around Bret and the two have a really nice date together.

Back at the house, Heather overhears Erin on the phone saying that Justin Timberlake will be at her bar and she would have been waiting on him. Heather writes a letter to Bret criticizing the other women. Heather talks to Bret about what she overheard during Erin's phone call.

During the group date, Bret tells the other women about the letter, who tell him not to believe it. Brandi M. tells Bret that Heather was on The Surreal Life and tried to sleep with Vanilla Ice.

After the group date, the other women confront Heather about what she wrote in the letter, and Heather claims the letter was all about her and how she feels about Bret. Lacey discusses the letter with Bret privately.

At elimination Jes, Mia, Brandi M., Magdalena, Lacey, Sam, and Heather get a pass. Erin is eliminated. Afterwards, Erin says that she has been with bigger stars than Bret Michaels.

- Challenge: Mudbowl
- Challenge Winners: Magdalena, Brandi M., Mia, Jes
- MVP: Jes
- Bottom 3: Sam, Heather, Erin
- Eliminated: Erin
- Reasons for Eliminations:
  - Erin: Felt she wasn't really there for him.

=== Tour Bus Challenge ===
First aired August 19, 2007

During this week's challenge, the women have to perform stunts patterned after a musician's life on the road. Brandi M. wins the challenge and wins a date with Bret to a hockey game to see the Anaheim Ducks.

The women celebrate Bret's birthday. Sam dances on the pole to Bret's delight. Heather and Lacey try to make Sam really jealous by grinding up on Bret. Sam leaves the party to go to her room.

Bret talks to Sam the next morning. Sam is packing up her things and talks to Bret about her jealousy issues and why she is so distrusting. Sam decided not to leave after all.

While Bret and Brandi M. are on their date, Bret leaves a note for the other women asking them to write to him why each of the other women is not the right woman for him.

The next morning, Bret talks to Magdalena about why she is so distant. Magdalena doesn't have much to say to him, and at elimination she is chosen to go home.

- Challenge: Hockey Game
- Challenge Winner: Brandi M.
- Bottom 3: Lacey, Sam, Magdalena
- Eliminated: Magdalena
- Reasons for Eliminations:
  - Magdalena: She became distant from him and felt that she wouldn't fit his lifestyle.

=== Show Me Your Hits ===
First aired August 26, 2007 (2.2M viewers)

The women design and pose for a mock album cover. Jes, Lacey, and Sam's team do a cover with Lacey posing suggestively over Sam. Mia, Heather, and Brandi M.'s team do a cover with Brandi M. dressed as a man. Both Lacey and Heather are shown trying to take control of their respective photo shoots, despite Jes and Mia's positions as creative directors. Bret chooses Jes, Lacey, and Sam's team as the winners. As a reward, Jes wins a solo date, and Lacey and Sam win a tandem date.

Lacey tells Bret that she feels she was the real creative force behind the album cover. Later, Jes asks Bret why he is keeping Lacey around when she seems so fake and crazy; Bret responds that "there's just something about her."

Lacey and Sam ride in a convertible Bentley on their tandem date with Bret. While Lacey is in the bathroom, Sam asks Bret why he is keeping Lacey around when he knows that she can be mean, conniving, fake and crazy. Bret now sheepishly admits he doesn't know why.

After the date, Jes's solo date is revealed to be a motorcycle ride to the beach.

Back at the house, Brandi M. and Heather take photos of each other in suggestive poses, including several topless pictures, to show Bret that they are capable of taking sexy photos. After they take several pictures, they stick them to the door of his room for him to see. Bret is certainly surprised by the pictures. Mia tries to discuss the situation with Bret, but he decides it is too late for explanations.

At dinner, Lacey begins to talk about her animal rights interests, which annoys Brandi M. and causes her to go to her room complaining of a headache. Brandi tells Bret that she is annoyed with Lacey. Bret notices that no one else likes Lacey (except maybe Heather), and that she might not just be "crazy for me," but "really crazy."

During elimination, Bret says that any connection he feels with Mia is "too little, too late." Mia is eliminated.

- Challenge: Pose for Album Covers
- Challenge Winners: Jes, Lacey, Sam
- Bottom 3: Brandi M., Heather, Mia
- Eliminated: Mia
- Reasons for Eliminations:
  - Mia: Felt she wasn't stepping it up and stated any connections he had with her was "too little, too late".

=== Superfan Challenge ===
First aired September 2, 2007

Bret's "super fans" interview and interact with the remaining five contestants. The three women ask pointed and prying questions to get truthful answers. The super fans praise Heather and Jes but give Brandi M, Sam and Lacey a rough time. Sam is now depressed and questions if she should even stay in the game.

After the interviews, the super fans decide that Heather should go on the date with Bret, and while they are on their date, the super fans spend time with Jes, Brandi M, Sam and Lacey. On the date, Heather gets her first tattoo, which is the word "Bret" on the back of her neck.

During the time at the house, the super fans join the girls for drinks and conversation. The super fans and Jes (with "help" from Brandi M. and Lacey) convince Sam not to leave the house, and she agrees. Lacey admits in a voiceover that she is just going along to talk to Sam to look good. The superfans challenge Lacey and say that she has not shown anything real yet, and Lacey turns on the waterworks, suggesting that no one knows how sensitive she truly is. Later in another voiceover, she insinuates she was being disingenuous again.

After returning from his date with Heather, Bret meets with the super fans again and they tell him that Jes is special and that Lacey is not for him. Bret states that all the other girls in the house think Lacey is crazy, so why not his super fans?

At the elimination, Heather gets the first pass, followed by Jes, then Brandi M., leaving only Lacey and Sam. Bret calls Lacey down and gives her the last pass and then tells Sam that her tour has ended. Sam promises to remain friends and Bret tells her that he hoped she would say they would remain more. After sharing a long passionate kiss, Sam leaves the house and says that if Bret has to make her go home, that was the way to do it.

- Challenge: Super Fan Challenge
- Challenge Winner: Heather
- Bottom 3: Brandi M., Lacey, Sam
- Eliminated: Sam
- Reasons for Eliminations:
  - Sam: Felt that Sam couldn't handle his rock 'n' roll lifestyle and was too emotional.

=== Vegas Baby ===
First aired September 9, 2007

This episode takes place in Las Vegas, where the four remaining contestants watch Bret perform and also experience the band's rock-and-roll lifestyle. When they arrive at the hotel, Big John tells the women that they should have "their A-game on" because after the concert, they will be having an intimate dinner with Bret in his hotel room, and whichever woman impresses him the most will also enjoy a "nightcap" solo date.

After the concert, the women party with the members of the Bret Michaels Band. Lacey and Brandi M. become highly intoxicated, and Lacey becomes aggressively belligerent toward both Brandi and Heather, during which Brandi M. farts to keep Lacey away. Both Big John and Bret tell them to quiet down, but Lacey is drunk beyond reason. A few moments later, Big John escorts the women to Bret’s room. Lacey needs to be carried and continues to antagonize the other women as they wait for dinner to be served. At one point Lacey crawls onto the bar and knocks down a substantial number of bottles, nearly falling off herself. She is incoherent and ready to pass out, so Bret sends Lacey to her room.

The remaining three try to enjoy dinner with Bret, but the presence of oysters on the table causes Brandi M. to vomit into her napkin. Jes and Bret escort her to the bathroom, and in a drunken haze, Brandi M. tells Bret that she loves him. Bret finds this "very emotional." Brandi is escorted to her room by Big John, and Bret chooses Jes over Heather because of the compassion she showed to both Lacey and Brandi M. Heather is very upset with Bret's decision.

Bret meets them poolside for private massages. During her massage, Brandi M. tells Bret that she really does love him and wants to work it out with him but doesn’t mention her conversion with Heather and Lacey. The two women demand to know if she told Bret how she feels, but don’t believe her when she says she did. Lacey decides to tell Bret how Brandi M. really feels and tells him about what she had said earlier. After the massages, Bret sends Brandi M. back to Los Angeles. She realizes that Bret must have heard something from Lacey or Heather and regrets her mistake of letting her guard down in front of them.

Heather and Lacey go on their date with Bret. Bret tells Heather that he’s confused by her and wonders if she’s truly devoted to him. Lacey sees her opportunity to plead her case, interrupting their conversation and reminding Bret that they haven’t gotten to spend alone time together. Bret decides to take Lacey on a private date.

During the elimination, Bret chooses Jes, then Lacey. When Heather realizes from Bret’s speech that Brandi M. never told him about her true feelings, she interrupts Bret and tells him what Brandi had said. Bret asks Brandi M. how she really feels and she says that she doesn't think she can bring her guard down and be with him. Bret appears aggravated and eliminates her, saying that she should have voiced her feelings sooner.

- Challenge: Impress Bret
- Challenge Winners: Jes, Lacey
- Bottom 2: Heather, Brandi M.
- Eliminated: Brandi M.
- Reasons for Eliminations:
  - Brandi M: After truly revealing her feelings to Bret, stating that she doesn't think she can bring her guard down, Bret angrily eliminates her stating she should have voiced her feelings sooner and that she played with his emotions.

=== Meet the Parents ===
First aired September 16, 2007 (3.5M viewers)

In this episode, Bret meets the remaining three girls' parents. While the families of Heather and Jes seem to interact with ease with each other and Bret, Lacey's family causes discomfort for Bret. During dinner at an L.A. restaurant, Lacey's dad reveals that Lacey is a 'Presidential Scholar' who lives off the largesse of her family. Bret seems surprised at this information, given Lacey's earlier assertions that she was a struggling musician. Later in the dinner, Lacey's father demands that Bret reveal his true intentions with his daughter, insinuating that he may be after Lacey for her money. The father also insists that the two obtain a prenuptial agreement, which Bret finds presumptuous given that at this point he is merely trying to get to know Lacey, not marry her.

The next day at the house, Lacey and Heather butt heads when Heather overhears Lacey telling Bret that Heather is fake around her family and does not intend to quit stripping should she win. The rancor continues as Heather excoriates Lacey for being mean, conniving, crazy, and fake, and Lacey and her father call Heather trashy. At one point, Heather angrily reveals in front of Lacey's family that she saw Lacey perform fellatio on Bret.

Soon after, Lacey's dad confronts Bret with the question that Bret says all rock stars dread, "I need to talk to you about whose dick my daughter has been sucking." As Bret lifts weights, he listens to Lacey's father discuss what he has been told and what he thinks is acceptable. Bret expresses frustration in his dialogue to the camera after the meeting.

At the elimination, Bret notes that his decision is being based upon who is being honest and genuine with him and who is not. Jes gets to stay in the house. Lacey is called down next and is summarily kicked out. He says that he sees two sides to her, but that in the end, the bad side would take over and he could not trust her. Heather is called down last and is invited to continue to rock Bret's world.

- Challenge: Meeting the Parents
- Bottom 2: Heather, Lacey
- Eliminated: Lacey
- Reasons for Eliminations:
  - Lacey: Saw two different sides of her, and felt in the end the bad side would take over.

=== Bret's Clip Show ===
First aired September 23, 2007

Recap of the first 10 episodes and behind the scenes clips.

=== The Rose And The Thorn ===
First aired September 30, 2007 (5.4M viewers)

Bret, Heather, and Jes travel to Cabo San Lucas, Mexico. Bret takes each woman on an all-day date in order to get to know each and ultimately make the final decision: which woman gets the chance to become his girlfriend.

Bret and Heather go on a dune buggy outing. After a short time Bret starts to feel as though he is experiencing diabetes symptoms. He suggests that they need to get something to eat, but Heather doesn’t take the hint. They continue to ride and then finally break for lunch. Later that evening, Heather tells Bret she's in love with him. Bret expresses concern that Heather and he connect on a strictly party level, and wonders if she ever slows down. Heather reassures him that she leads a very quiet life outside the club. Bret is still not feeling great, so after dinner they retire to his room. The closing shot of the hotel’s exterior includes a voiceover of Bret whispering “sweet nothings”.

The next day, it is Jes' turn with Bret. Heather tries to antagonize Jes before the date, but she responds by giving Bret a passionate kiss. Their date takes place on a 70-foot (21 m) yacht. Bret tells Jes that she needs to take the jump or she'll never know if she's in love, and she tells him that she fears rejection. Later that evening, they go to another resort for a private dinner. Once again, Bret starts to feel diabetes symptoms, and tells Jes that she will have to inject him if he goes into diabetic shock. Jes is immediately sympathetic. She decides that his well-being is more important than her emotional struggle and “takes the plunge”. Jes and Bret go back to the resort and enjoy a relaxing nude soak in his hot tub.

The next morning, the two women travel back to Los Angeles for the final elimination. Bret claims he can’t make up his mind and offers a solution: he asks both women if they will each be his girlfriend. Heather responds yes, but Jes says that she can’t share someone she cares about with anyone. Bret calls Heather forward but tells her that she is not the one for him. She angrily storms out. Jes is Bret's Rock of Love.

- Jes's Date: Yacht Riding
- Heather's Date: Dune Buggy Outing
- Bret's Rock of Love: Jes
- Eliminated: Heather

=== Reunion ===
First aired October 7, 2007 (3.9M viewers)

Bret and 20 of the contestants (five girls did not show up) from the show get together for one final retrospective. Brandi C. and Kristia discuss their friendship, and that they are now roommates. Rodeo talks about her son, and Bret tells her that he would like to still be friends. Samantha discusses always trying to leave. Bret goes backstage to give the girls some alone time together. Lacey and Dallas talk about the fight on the third episode. Lacey touches Dallas, and Dallas tells Lacey not to touch her. Lacey gives a shirt to Dallas that reads Dallas loves Michael Vick. Brandi M. is brought down to talk to Lacey. Brandi M. asks if Lacey slept with Bret, Lacey at first tried to avoid it. Brandi M. then says if Lacey did then she didn't want to be with a man that slept with her. Heather discusses the feud that ensued after she heard that Lacey told Bret that she is a fake. Heather and Lacey hug and make up. Mia then confronts Lacey about Lacey's lewd behavior towards her in one episode, to which Lacey claims that she doesn't even remember Mia even being on the show. Then, Bret is brought back out, and Heather announces that she got more tattoos, one of which is adding "Sucks" to the "Bret" tattoo on the back of her neck. She says it is a joke. Jes is brought out, and says that Bret should have chosen Heather due to their obvious connection. Heather and Jes hug and Jes apologizes to her.

- Contestants Who Did Attend: Jes, Heather, Lacey, Brandi M, Samantha, Mia, Magdalena, Erin, Rodeo, Brandi C, Dallas, Kristia, Tawny, Faith, Tiffany, Tamara, Bonnie, Lauren, Jessica, Krista.
- Contestants Who Did Not Attend: Raven, Kelly, Kimberly, Meredith, Pam.

== After the show ==
- Jes discussed in an interview that in the six months after the taping of the show ended, she received one phone call from Bret's manager (rather than Bret himself), who connected her to Bret, asking her to appear on the reunion show. She received another phone call from Bret's manager asking her to send back his cowboy hat.
- Heather, Lacey, and Rodeo made cameo appearances on the second season of "Rock of Love". Heather also made an appearance on the show's reunion, where she got into a physical altercation with the runner-up of the show, Daisy De la Hoya.
- Brandi C., Heather, and Rodeo appeared on the first season of "I Love Money", where they placed 7th, 9th, and 11th place respectively.
- Brandi M., Lacey, Heather, Brandi C., Dallas, Rodeo, and Raven appeared on Rock of Love: Charm School, where Brandi M. was the winner and the rest placed 3rd, 4th, 7th, 8th, 11th, and last place respectively.
- Heather and Lacey made cameo appearances on the third season of "Rock of Love".
- Tamara appeared on the second season of "I Love Money", where she came in last place.
- Brandi C. appeared on Megan Wants a Millionaire as one of Megan's friends to help her choose the right guy for Megan.
- Lacey was a contestant on the canceled third season of "I Love Money", where it is believed she came in 6th place.

== DVD release ==
The season was released on a three disc DVD set that includes several extended and deleted scenes, although it is censored, as vulgarity and nudity is edited out. It has however been released uncensored in Australia.
