= A New High in Low =

A New High In Low

Studio album by Pigface
- Released: August 26, 1997
- Genre: Industrial
- Length: 126:00
- Label: Invisible
- Producer: The Girl Brothers

Pigface chronology
Feels Like Heaven (1995)	A New High In Low (1997)	Below the Belt (1998)

Professional ratings
Review scores
Source	Rating
AllMusic	3/5 stars

A New High in Low is a double-disc album released by Pigface on August 26, 1997, featuring the work of Martin Atkins, Genesis P-Orridge, Dave Wright, and Meg Lee Chin.

Production is credited to "The Girl Brothers", a pseudonym of Martin Atkins.

== Track listing ==
=== Disc 1 ===
"Low"
No.	Title	Credit	Length
1.	"Radio Bagpipe"	Martin Atkins, Curse Mackey	3:44
2.	"Kiss King" (High High High)	Atkins, Catlin, The Girl Bros., Marydee Reynolds	5:34
3.	"Burundi"	Atkins, Dirk Flanigan, Marc Heal	4:34
4.	"Bring Unto Me"	Atkins, Alex Welz	4:41
5.	"More"	Atkins, The Girl Bros.	5:14
6.	"Nutopia"	Atkins, Meg Lee Chin	4:27
7.	"Methylated: I. Breathalised/II. Crystallised/III. Synthesized/IV. Immortalised"	Atkins, The Girl Bros.	4:26
8.	"Aboriginal"	Atkins, Paul Ferguson, Algis A. Kizys, Jim Marcus, Louis Svitek	4:11
9.	"Metal Tangerine"	Atkins, Flanigan, Mark Spybey	3:43
10.	"First Taken Third Found"	Atkins, The Girl Bros.	3:36
11.	"Warzone"	Atkins	4:31
12.	"You Know/You Know/You Know"	Atkins	4:31

=== Disc 2 ===
"High"
No.	Title	Credit	Length
1.	"The Howler: An English Breakfast" (Chapter 1, Part 1)	Atkins, Genesis P-Orridge	30:03
2.	"Train"	Atkins	24:18
3.	"The Howler: An English Breakfast" (Chapter 1, Part 2)	Atkins, P-Orridge	19:23

== Personnel ==
- Martin Atkins - drums, vocals (1), loops (3–4, 13–15), synths (2, 7), samples (11, 12), piano (14), bells (10), noises (1), horns (7), bass (11, 12), mellotron (11, 12), programming (2, 5, 6, 9)
- Curse Mackey - vocals (1)
- BobDog - sitar (2, 5)
- Mary Dee Reynolds - vocals (2)
- Dave Wright - didgeridoo (3), synths (3, 14), waterphone (14)
- Ben Stokes - scratches (3)
- Marc Heal - vocals (3)
- Dirk Flanigan - vocals (3, 9)
- Alex Welz - vocals (4)
- Obioma Little - vocals (5, 10–12)
- Steve Crittall - guitar (6), bass (6)
- Meg Lee Chin - vocals (6), guitar (6), programming (6)
- Amy Larson - vocals (7)
- Dana Cochrane - vocals (7)
- Al Kiyzs - bass (8)
- Paul Ferguson - drums (8)
- Louis Svitek - guitar (8)
- Jim Marcus - vocals (8)
- DJ Jordan Fields - scratches (9, 11, 12)
- Mark Spybey - vocals (9)
- Vikki Omega Stokes - vocals (9)
- Adam Yoffe - programming (10)
- Mick Harris - bass (13, 15)
- Genesis P-Orridge - vocals (13, 15)
- Jim Sochacki - engineering (1, 2)
- Jason McNinch - engineering (8)
