= Easy Listening (Pigface album) =

Easy Listening... For Difficult F***heads

Studio album by Pigface
- Released: January 17, 2003
- Genre: Industrial
- Labels: Underground, Inc. Invisible Records
- Producer: Martin Atkins

Pigface chronology
The Best of Pigface: Preaching to the Perverted (2001)	Easy Listening... For Difficult F***heads (2003)	Dubhead (2004)

Professional ratings
Review scores
Source	Rating
AllMusic	3/5 stars

Easy Listening... For Difficult F***heads is an album by Pigface, released in 2003. The album includes contributions from Chris Vrenna, Fallon Bowman, Keith Levene, Edsel Dope, Jared Louche, Jason Miller, Penn Jillette, En Esch, Chris Connelly, and Steven Seibold.

== Critical reception ==
The Washington Post wrote that the album "emphasizes hammering disco-metal but also encompasses Bowie-ish art-croon ('Miss Sway Action') and a sort of raga-rock ('Closer to Heaven')." The Cleveland Scene called the album "coherent and engaging: a good starting point for the curious and an improvement for the longtime fan." The Pitch wrote that it combines "the seemingly disparate worlds of atmospheric head music and straight-ahead hardcore in a way that satisfies both sides of the brain." The Chicago Tribune called Easy Listening "a kaleidoscopic blitz of psychedelia, decadent grooves and corrosive riffing."

== Track listing ==
No.	Title	Length
1.	"Mind Your Own Business" (Delta 5 cover)	3:25
2.	"Insect / Suspect"	3:53
3.	"Sweetmeat"	3:10
4.	"Bitch (Mattress Mix)" (Dope cover)	3:10
5.	"Everything"	3:29
6.	"Closer to Heaven"	5:12
7.	"Blow You Away (G.T.F.A.F.M.)"	3:28
8.	"Du Liebst Mich Nicht, Ich Lieb' Dich Nicht"	4:20
9.	"King of Negativity"	3:36
10.	"Miss Sway Action"	4:11
11.	"Binary Stream"	3:18
12.	"The Loneliest Sound I've Ever Heard"	3:19
13.	"The Horse You Rode in On"	2:42

== Personnel ==
- Martin Atkins - drums, voices (1, 13), vocals (5, 12), vibraphone (12), scratches (5, 7, 8, 12, 13) mixing (1, 3–7, 9, 11–13)
- Chris Connelly - vocals (2, 9, 10)
- Steven Seibold - vocals (2), guitars (2), programming (2)
- Keith Levene - guitars (6)
- Charles Levi - bass (6, 8, 13)
- Groovie Mann - vocals (6, 12)
- Lacey Conner - vocals (6)
- Mary Dee Reynolds - vocals (6)
- Chris Vrenna - programming (7)
- En Esch - vocals (8)
- Krztoff - vocals (9), guitar (9)
- Julian Beeston - programming (13), synths (13), others (13)
- Jason Miller - vocals (7)
- The Method - bass, programming (7)
- Mike Miller - guitar (7)
- Edsel Dope - vocals (4), guitar (4), bass (4), programming (4)
- Andre Karkos - additional guitar (4)
- Curse Mackey - voice (13)
- Meg Lee Chin - backing vocals (1)
- Greta Brinkman - bass (1)
- Jason McNinch - guitar (1)
- Adam Yoffe - programming (1)
- DJ Lumas - scratches (1–3, 5)
- Chris Randall - synths (1, 2, 5), acoustic guitar (9)
- Fallon Bowman - vocals (1, 4), guitars (2, 5, 13)
- Nick Korostyshevsky - mixing (2), acoustic guitar (5)
- Dave Suycott - mixing
- Michelle Walters - vocals (2, 5)
- John Bergin - vocals (3), composition (3)
- Lo - vocals (3)
- David Flick - synths (5)
- Rahul Sharma - sitar (6)
- Judd Gruenbaum - vocals (7)
- Jason Novak - vocals (8), programming (8), mixing (8)
- Grey Parker - drums (8)
- Dan Brill - tabla drum (8)
- Jared Louche - vocals (11)
- Ezekiel Kazem - engineering (13)
- Penn Jillette - voice (13)
- Ross Tregenza - engineering (11)
