= Lab Report =

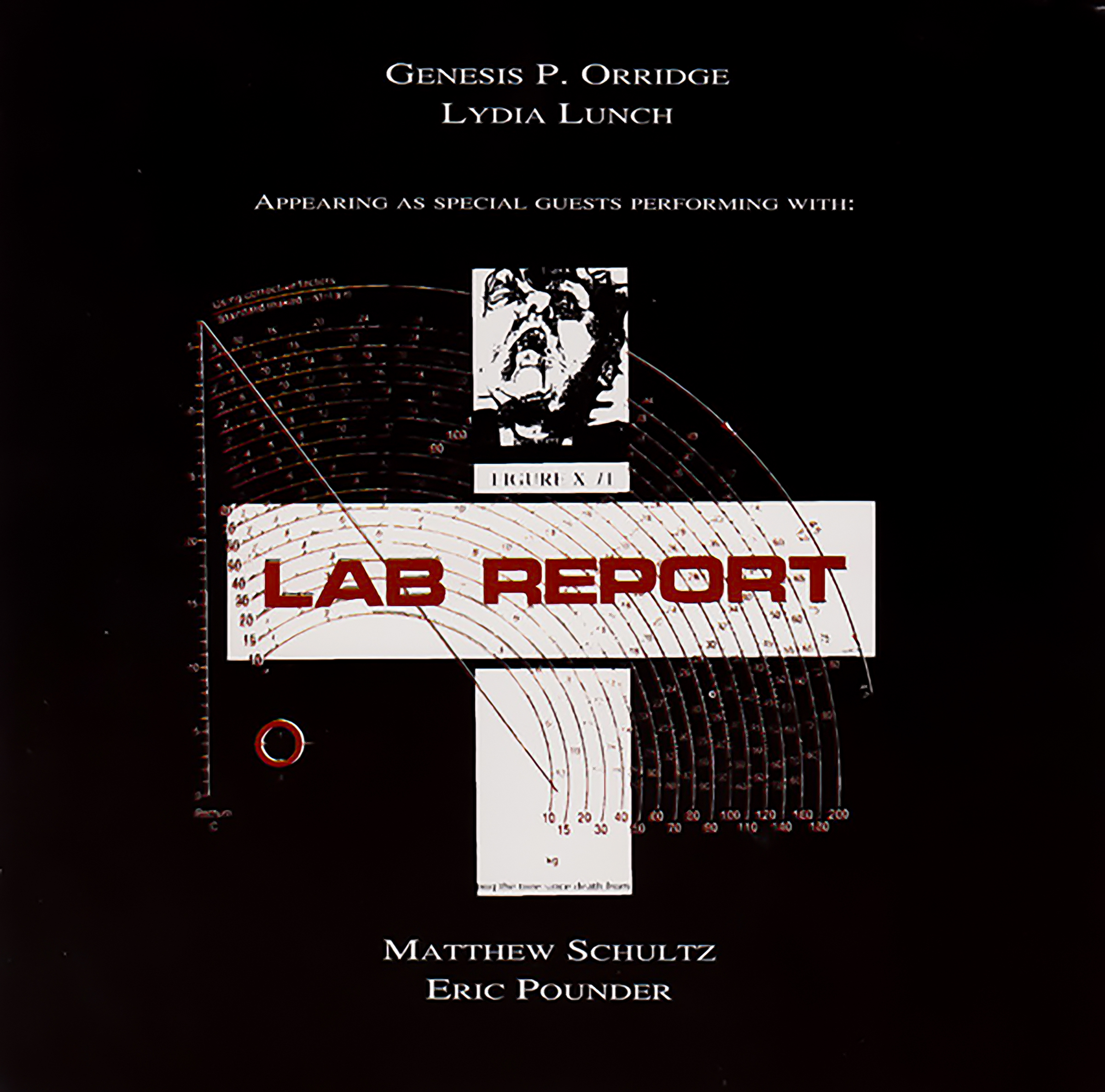
- CD Cover from Unhealthy

Background information
- Origin: Chicago, IL
- Genres: Ambient, experimental, dark ambient
- Years active: 1989–2001
- Labels: Invisible Records; Gein Records
- Members: Matthew Schultz
- Past members: Genesis P Orridge; Lydia Lunch; Chris Connelly; Jonny Polonsky; Dan Burke; Eric Pounder; Chris Blazen; Becky Allen; Tom Slattery; Kerry Simonian; Derek Frederickson

Lab Report was an improvisational, dark ambient, band created by Matthew Schultz, Eric Pounder and Chris Blazen in 1989. The experimental project gained notoriety as one of the earliest dark ambient musical projects stemming from the Industrial music genre.

== History ==
The Chicago-based experimental band was signed to Invisible Records in 1990 and released four CDs with that label. The band became notable for their use of the sculptural dulcimer instrument known as the A.T.G. or Anti Tank Guitar created by Matthew Schultz. Lab Report membership had always been in rotation with special guests including Genesis P Orridge, Lydia Lunch, Chris Connelly, Jonny Polonsky, Chris Blazen, Becky Allen, Kerry Simonian, Derek Frederickson, Tom Slattery, and more.

Matthew Schultz went on as the head of Lab Report and released three more albums with the Gein label. The project's musical style broadened to cover a wide range and became increasingly multimedia.

== Discography ==
- Fig X-71 (1991) (Invisible Records)
- Unhealthy (1993) (Invisible Records)
- Terminal (1995) (Invisible Records)
- Excision (1997) (Invisible Records)
- All Your Little Pieces, Make Me a Whole (1998) (Gein Records)
- -Classical -Atmospheres (1999) (Gein Records)
- 2000 After Death Live (2000) (Gein Records)

=== Compilations ===
- Industrial Revolution - First Edition (1993)
- Industrial Revolution - Second Edition (1994)
- Total Devotion (1994)
- Invisible Route Six Six Six (1995)
- Can You See It Yet? (1995)
- Drug Test 1 & 2 (1995)
- Drug Test 3 & 4 (1997)
- F*cking Sick and Menacing (1997)
- Ultrasonik (1998)
- Eye Grind Disturbance? (1998)
- Gone Too Far (1999)
- The Information Apocalypse Comp (2002)
