= Nocturne (band) =

American industrial rock band

- Origin: Dallas, Texas, U.S.
- Genres: Industrial rock, industrial metal, nu metal
- Years active: 1995–Present
- Labels: Triple X Records; Invisible Records; Underground, Inc. Hollows Hill
- Members: Lacey Sculls; Chris Telkes; Rotny Ford
- Past members: Ivan McRoy; Ben Graves; Jason Epperley; Clay Fagan; David Gee; Benji Kauth

Nocturne was an industrial rock band formed in 1995 in Dallas, Texas. The band's core members were Lacey Sculls and Chris Telkes, and several touring musicians, usually Ben Graves of the Murderdolls and "Rotten" Rotny also guitar player of the industrial/metal band Psyclon Nine.

== Band members ==
- Lacey Sculls (Vocals, Songwriting)
- Chris Telkes (Guitar, Programming, Songwriting, Production)
- Rotny (Live Bass)

== Discography ==
Nocturne's Studio Albums
Year	Album	Label	Other notes
1999	Twilight	Triple X Records/Hollows Hill	Studio album (debut)
2001	Welcome To Paradise	Triple X Records/Hollows Hill	Studio album
2002	Paradise Wasted	Invisible Records/Underground, Inc.	Re-release album
2003	Axis of Evil: Mixes of Mass Destruction	Invisible Records/Underground, Inc.	Remix album
2005	Guide to Extinction	Triple X Records	Studio album

=== Twilight ===
Nocturne was originally picked up by Triple X records and Hollows Hill. Twilight, Nocturnes debut CD was a blend of dark wave and industrial music and received mixed reviews. After its release, they toured with Ministry, Genitorturers, Christian Death, Godhead, Switchblade Symphony, Ohgr, and even Marilyn Manson.

Track listing

1. Seeing Things
2. Dead Sea
3. Spookius Mortem
4. A Happy Death
5. Monarch
6. Hallucination
7. Pride Must Be Sacrficed [P.M.S.]
8. Sub-Mission
9. Underworld
10. Shock
11. Pyrrhic Victory
12. Embrace
13. Lament
14. They Come
15. Twilight's Madness

=== Welcome To Paradise ===
After heavy touring in support of Twilight, Nocturnes second album, "Welcome to Paradise" was released. The band received a nomination for "Best Industrial Band" in the Dallas Observer.

- Track listing
1. Happy
2. My Bitch
3. Head Trip
4. Dissolute
5. Vortex
6. Waiting for Anything
7. Sad
8. It Burns
9. Final Hour
10. If I Could Leave, I Would
11. Empty Inside
12. Flirt (Part 1)
13. Flirt (Part 2)

=== Paradise Wasted ===
In a breakaway move, Nocturne was signed onto Invisible Records/Underground, Inc. One year later, "Paradise Wasted" was released. This CD was one of two "filler CDs" to bridge the gap between "Welcome to Paradise" and "Guide to Extinction". Paradise Wasted was essentially Welcome To Paradise with a new cover, now remastered, with two new bonus songs added, "Whore", and "Digit."

- Track listing
1. Happy
2. My Bitch
3. Whore
4. Head Trip
5. Dissolute
6. Vortex
7. Waiting for Anything
8. Digit
9. Sad
10. It Burns
11. Final Hour
12. If I Could Leave, I Would
13. Empty Inside
14. Flirt (Part 1)
15. Flirt (Part 2)

=== Axis of Evil: Mixes of Mass Destruction ===
After another year, Axis of Evil: Mixes of Mass Destruction was turned out in 2003, again, to pass the time for the band, working forward for its third album. Axis of Evil was more limited in its edition, now out of print. Axis was a remix album of Paradise Wasted. The entire CD consisted of only 13 songs, but included a grand total of five versions of "Whore" and two versions of "My Bitch."

- Track listing
1. Happy [Bile Meets the Inbred Brothers Free Hat Pull the Plug Mix]
2. My Bitch [Joolz Mix]
3. Whore [the Big Fat Whore on Dope Remix]
4. Dissolute [Etulossid Murder]
5. Happy [Mattress Factory Mix]
6. Whore [Hate Dept Mix]
7. Dissolution [Torrent Vaccine Mix]
8. My Bitch [All Fours Mix]
9. Happy [in the Flesh Mix]
10. Whore [Whorrific Mix]
11. Whore [Dkay.com Remix]
12. Whore [Whoreniest Show on Earth Remix]
13. Waiting for Anything [Everything Now Mix]

== Guest appearances ==
- "Anthems of Rust and Decay:A Tribute to Marilyn Manson" (performing Get Your Gunn)
- "Easy Listening..." (Lacey performing Closer To Heaven)
- "Dim View of the Future" (Chris Telkes performing Emily's Humming Mix)
- "The Broken Machine: A Tribute to Nine Inch Nails" (performing Kinda, I Want To)
- Lacey was a contestant on VH1's reality show Rock of Love with Bret Michaels from the 80's rock band Poison. Several of her housemates criticized her for her tactics in trying to win and nicknamed her "The Devil". On the Rock of Love Reunion Show, Nocturne performed "Shallow" from the album Guide to Extinction.

== Tours ==
Nocturne's Live Tours
Year	Title	Headline act
2002	The Demon Machine Tour	Bile
2003	The Puppet Master Tour	King Diamond
2004	The Sexecution Tour	Bozo Porno Circus
2005 (spring)	The Free For All Tour	Pigface
2005 (summer/fall)	The Music For Freedom Tour	Dope & Mushroomhead
