= Fook (album) =

Studio album by Pigface
- Released: October 19, 1992
- Genre: Industrial
- Length: 45:52
- Label: Invisible
- Producer: Martin Atkins

Pigface chronology
Welcome to Mexico... Asshole (1991)	Fook (1992)	Washingmachine Mouth (1993)

Fook is the second studio album by industrial rock supergroup Pigface, released in 1992 on Invisible Records.

== Reception ==
Professional ratings
Review scores
Source	Rating
Allmusic	4.5/5 stars

Fook was well received. Jim Harper of Allmusic praised the album strongly, noting that Pigface has a reputation for inconsistency, and saying, "when the mixture works—as it does on Fook—the results can be spectacular.... This is the sound of Pigface at their best, and having a damn good time too."

== Track listing ==
No.	Title	Credit	Length
1.	"Alles Ist Mine"	Martin Atkins, En Esch, Günter Schulz, William Tucker, Andrew Weiss	3:55
2.	"Ten Ground and Down"	Atkins, Chris Connelly, Esch, Lesley Rankine, Ruchhoft	6:15
3.	"Seven Words"	Atkins, Ian Hoxley, Tucker, Weiss	1:36
4.	"Insemination"	Atkins, Kevin Ogilvie	4:52
5.	"Hips, Tits, Lips, Power"	Atkins, Esch, Hoxley, Rankine, Paul Raven, Tucker, Weiss	5:23
6.	"Satellite"	Atkins, Hoxley, Raven, Tucker, Weiss	5:10
7.	"I'm Still Alive"	Atkins, Esch, Tucker	4:03
8.	"Auto Hag"	Atkins, Esch, Hoxley, Tucker	4:42
9.	"Go"	Atkins, Esch, Ogilvie, Tucker	3:39
10.	"I Can Do No Wrong"	Atkins, Connelly, David Sims	6:17

== Personnel ==
All information from 1992 CD booklet.

=== Musicians ===
- Martin Atkins - drums, production, backing vocals (9, 10)
- Chris Connelly - vocals (2, 10), guitar (10)
- William Tucker - guitar (1, 3, 6, 9), programming (3, 5, 7, 9), samples (7, 9), bass (3), keyboards (8)
- Paul Raven - bass (1, 5, 6)
- Andrew Weiss - bass (1, 3, 5, 6–8), programming (6)
- Nivek Ogre - vocals (4, 9), backing vocals (7)
- En Esch - guitar (1, 2, 5, 6, 8), vocals (1, 7, 9), drums (1), programming (1)
- Günter Schulz - guitar (1)
- Mary Byker - vocals (3, 5, 6, 8)
- Barbara Hunter - cello (2)
- Lesley Rankine - vocals (2, 5)
- Fuzz - guitar (5)
- Chris Haskett - guitar (6)
- Matt Schultz - sounds (2, 4)
- Sean Joyce - scratching (4)
- Bella Black - backing vocals (1)
- David Sims - bass (10)

=== Production ===
- Producer – Martin Atkins
- Engineers – Mark Walk, Andy Reilly, Lee Popa, Keith Auerbach
- Assistant engineers – Eric Anderson, Andy Levine, Dino Morelli
- Mastering – Jack Skinner
- Artwork – Fred Blue
- Design and layout – Patrick Siemer
