= Gub =

Studio album by Pigface
- Released: April 10, 1991
- Genre: Industrial
- Length: 63:17
- Label: Invisible
- Producer: Steve Albini

Pigface chronology
Lean Juicy Pork (1990)	Gub (1991)	Welcome to Mexico... Asshole (1991)

Professional ratings
Review scores
Source	Rating
AllMusic	4/5 stars

Gub is the debut studio album by American rock band Pigface, released on April 10, 1991. It is notable for featuring contributions from Trent Reznor of Nine Inch Nails, with Reznor later re-recording the song "Suck" for the Nine Inch Nails EP Broken, released in 1992.

== Track listing ==
No.	Title	Credit	Length
1.	"Tapeworm"	Martin Atkins, Bill Rieflin, Ogilvie	4:38
2.	"The Bushmaster"	Atkins, Rieflin, David Yow, Trent Reznor	5:22
3.	"Cylinder Head World"	Atkins, Rieflin	3:48
4.	"Point Blank"	Atkins, Rieflin, Chris Connelly	2:57
5.	"Suck"	Atkins, Rieflin, Paul Barker, Reznor	3:42
6.	"Symphony for Taps"	Atkins	1:25
7.	"The Greenhouse"	Atkins, Rieflin	3:28
8.	"Little Sisters"	Atkins, Rieflin, Connelly, William Tucker	3:05
9.	"Tailor Made"	Atkins, Rieflin, Barker	6:04
10.	"War Ich Nicht Immer Ein Guter Junge? War Ich Nicht Immer Schoen Und Nett? Ich Zerpfluckte Niemals Eine Spinne; War Niemals Frech Und Stahl"	Atkins, Rieflin, En Esch	4:57
11.	"Blood and Sand"	Atkins, Rieflin, Connelly, Matt Schultz	4:37
12.	"Weightless"	Atkins, Rieflin, Connelly, Barker	4:13

Compact disc versions of Gub include the four remix tracks that originally appeared on the Spoon Breakfast EP.

== Personnel ==
- Martin Atkins - drums (1, 2, 4, 5, 7–12), sounds (3, 6)
- William Rieflin - drums (2–5, 7–12), guitar (7, 8, 12), bass (4, 9), synthesizer (10), sounds (1)
- Paul Barker - bass (5, 12), vocals (9)
- Chris Connelly - vocals (4, 7, 8, 11, 12), tape loops (12), sounds (11)
- En Esch - vocals (10)
- Nivek Ogre - vocals (1)
- Trent Reznor - vocals (5), tape loops (2)
- Matt Schultz - sounds (11)
- William Tucker - guitar (7, 8)
- David Yow - vocals (2)

Additional assistance provided by

- Steve Albini - production (1–12), bass (1), guitar (4), sounds (9)
- Kurt Moore - sounds (5)
