= William Tucker (musician) =

American guitarist (1961–1999)

Edwin William Tucker (January 4, 1961 – May 14, 1999) was an American guitarist whose credits included work with Ministry, My Life with the Thrill Kill Kult, Pigface, Chemlab, and Chris Connelly. He grew up in New Jersey, where he formed Regressive Aid with Andrew Weiss and Sim Cain (both later of Gone and the Rollins Band). He also taught the guitar to locals, one of whom was Mickey "Dean Ween" Melchiondo of the alternative band Ween.

== Career ==
After the release of the single "(Ever Since I Was Young) I Love the Sound of Machines" with the Swinging Pistons in 1986, he came to the attention of Ministry's Al Jourgensen, who invited him to join his band for their "The Mind Is a Terrible Thing to Taste" tour in 1989. After a year of touring with Ministry, Tucker became a much sought-after musician.

== Death ==
On May 14, 1999, 38-year-old Tucker was found dead in his apartment of an apparent suicide after taking an excess of prescription pills and slitting his own throat.
