= Pigface =

American industrial rock supergroup

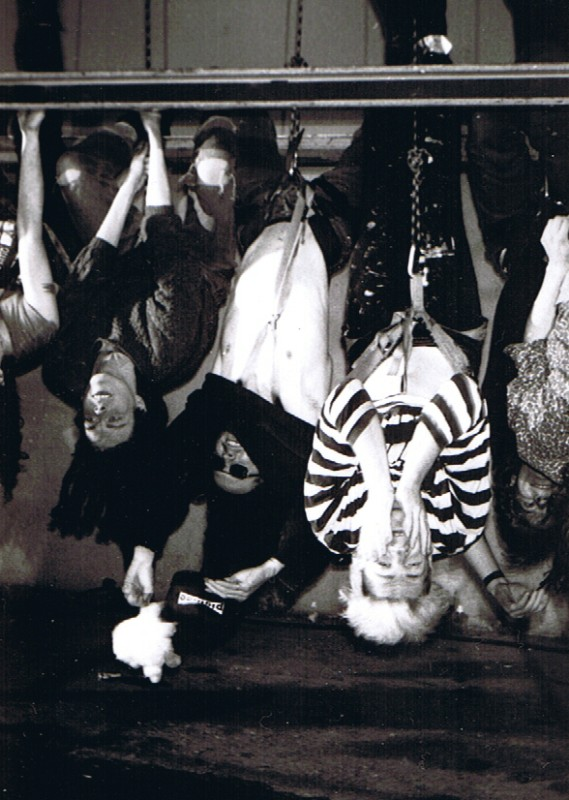
- Members of Pigface in 1991 in Palo Alto, California; left to right: Chris Connelly, Nivek Ogre, Martin Atkins

Background information
- Origin: Chicago, Illinois, U.S.
- Genre: Industrial rock
- Years active: 1990–2009; 2016; 2019
- Label: Invisible
- Members: See § Members and collaborators below.

Pigface is an American industrial rock supergroup formed in 1990 by Martin Atkins and William Rieflin.

== History ==
Pigface was formed from Ministry's The Mind Is a Terrible Thing to Taste tour, which produced the In Case You Didn't Feel Like Showing Up live album and video. For the tour, Al Jourgensen recruited musicians such as Nivek Ogre and Chris Connelly to join the lineup. Also joining was drummer Martin Atkins, to play alongside Bill Rieflin, then Ministry's regular drummer. Atkins later stated that while he enjoyed performing with a second drummer, he felt the lineup was capable of more than functioning as what he has described as "a Ministry cover band". After the tour, Atkins and Rieflin decided to continue working together and invited several of their tourmates to join. This led to the formation of Pigface, conceived as a revolving-door collaboration with various experimentally minded musicians, many of whom, especially in the early years, had also recorded for the influential industrial label Wax Trax! Records. Rieflin left the band after the first tour, leaving Atkins as the sole founder of the group.

Trent Reznor was also an early collaborator, before Nine Inch Nails became a household name. "Suck", co-written and sung by Reznor, was something of an underground hit, and Reznor later re-recorded the song for the Broken EP.

With hundreds of musical collaborators to recording and performing with Pigface, it has ensured that each album, tour, and song is unique. However, this practice has led to some negative criticism due to a perceived lack of continuity.

In 2009, Full Effect Records, a Detroit-based label, announced the signing of Pigface. The Pigface album, 6, a collection of songs already recorded over the span of the previous five years, was released soon after the announcement was made. Unlike with the previous releases, there was no tour to support the album.

After a seven-year hiatus, Pigface returned for two Chicago performances in November 2016. The first was a rehearsal show held at Reggie's on November 24. On November 25, the band performed at House of Blues: Chicago. Both shows saw the band performing with several first-time members as well as the return of members like Lesley Rankine, En Esch, Mary Byker, Curse Mackey, Dirk Flannigan and Fallon Bowman.

Several offshoot bands of Pigface, all smaller sized all-star groups featuring Martin Atkins as a common member, have released albums during the time Pigface was active. These bands include Murder, Inc., The Damage Manual, Ritalin, Martin Atkins And The Chicago Industrial League, Spasm, and The Love Interest.

In March 2019, Atkins announced that Pigface would tour again for the first time in fourteen years with thirteen dates scheduled for the East coast and Midwest in November 2019. On February 12, 2020, a larger, national tour was announced to be taking place throughout May, June and July of that year. However, on April 2, 2020, Atkins made the announcement that, as a result of the COVID-19 pandemic, the tour had been canceled.

Rieflin died on March 24, 2020, from cancer at the age of 59.

== Members and collaborators ==
The following is a partial list of musicians who have contributed to Pigface at some point in the band's history, whether it be appearing live as a band member, performing on an album, or contributing a remix of a Pigface song.

- Martin Atkins (Public Image Ltd, Ministry, Killing Joke, Brian Brain, Murder, Inc., Rx)
- William Rieflin (Ministry, Revolting Cocks, KMFDM, R.E.M., Robyn Hitchcock & the Venus 3, Swans, King Crimson)
- Trent Reznor (Nine Inch Nails, How to Destroy Angels)
- Paul Barker (Ministry, Lead into Gold, Revolting Cocks)
- Chris Connelly (Ministry, Murder, Inc., The Damage Manual, Revolting Cocks)
- En Esch (KMFDM, Slick Idiot)
- Nivek Ogre (Skinny Puppy, ohGr, Rx)
- Matthew Schultz (Lab Report, Lard)
- William Tucker (Regressive Aid, Ministry, Revolting Cocks, KMFDM)
- David Yow (The Jesus Lizard, Scratch Acid)
- Steve Albini (Big Black, Rapeman, Shellac)
- John Wills (Loop, The Hair and Skin Trading Company)
- Danny Carey (Tool, Green Jellö)
- Jimmy Chamberlin (The Smashing Pumpkins, Zwan)
- Pat Sprawl (Skinny Puppy, Dead Surf Kiss, Drown)
- Flea (Red Hot Chili Peppers, Fear)
- Genesis P-Orridge (Psychic TV, Throbbing Gristle, Thee Majesty, Splinter Test)
- Dean Ween (Ween, Moistboyz, Dean Ween Group)
- Black Francis (Pixies, Frank Black and the Catholics)
- Joey Santiago (Pixies, The Martinis)
- Michael Gira (Swans, Angels of Light)
- J.G. Thirlwell (Foetus, Clint Ruin, Steroid Maximus)
- Paul Raven (Killing Joke, Prong, Murder, Inc., Ministry, Godflesh)
- Youth (Killing Joke, The Fireman)
- Paul Ferguson (Killing Joke, Warrior Soul, Murder, Inc.)
- Jared Louche (Chemlab)
- Alex Paterson (The Orb)
- Duane Denison (The Jesus Lizard, Tomahawk)
- Lydia Lunch (Teenage Jesus and the Jerks)
- Charles Levi (My Life with the Thrill Kill Kult)
- Groovie Mann (My Life with the Thrill Kill Kult, Excessive Force)
- Buzz McCoy (My Life with the Thrill Kill Kult)
- Kitty Killdare (My Life with the Thrill Kill Kult)
- Laura Gomel (My Life with the Thrill Kill Kult)
- Lacey Sculls (Nocturne, Lords of Acid, Halo)
- Michelle Walters Seibold (VooDou, My Life with the Thrill Kill Kult, Super Sport, Bomb Gang Girlz, Missy Hell)
- Steven Seibold (Hate Dept., Damage Manual, Super Sport)
- Lee Fraser (Sheep on Drugs)
- Skot Diablo (Sheep on Drugs, Diablo Syndrome)
- Dave Wright (Not Breathing)
- Amy Larson (Brits Out Of America)
- Dana Cochrane (Brits Out Of America, Mickey Finn, Babes in Toyland)
- DJ Jordan Fields
- FM Einheit (Einsturzende Neubauten)
- Caspar Brötzmann (Caspar Brötzmann Massaker)
- Jennie Bellestar (The Belle Stars)
- Sigtryggur "Siggi" Baldursson (Sugarcubes)
- David Wm. Sims (The Jesus Lizard, Unfact, Rapeman, Scratch Acid)
- Michael Balch (Front Line Assembly)
- Joel Gausten (The Undead, Electric Frankenstein, Squiggy)
- Chris Randall (Sister Machine Gun)
- Louis Svitek (Zoetrope, Ministry, Lard, Mind Funk, M.O.D., Project .44)
- JS Clayden (Pitchshifter)
- Jello Biafra (Dead Kennedys, Lard, Jello Biafra and the Guantanamo School of Medicine)
- Andrew Weiss (Regressive Aid, Gone, Rollins Band, Ween, Butthole Surfers, Jello Biafra and the Guantanamo School of Medicine)
- Chris Haskett (Rollins Band)
- Brandon Finley (Dog Eat Dog, Urban Blight)
- Chris Vrenna (Tweaker, Nine Inch Nails, Marilyn Manson)
- Jim Marcus (Die Warzau)
- Van Christie (Die Warzau)
- Hanin Elias (Atari Teenage Riot)
- Meg Lee Chin (Crunch, Teknofear)
- Edsel Dope (Dope, Static X)
- Naoko Yamano (Shonen Knife)
- Atsuko Yamano (Shonen Knife)
- Michie Nakatani (Shonen Knife)
- Taime Downe (Faster Pussycat, The Newlydeads)
- Beefcake the Mighty (a.k.a. Michael Bishop) (Gwar, Kepone, American Grizzly, Sarah White & The Pearls)
- Slymenstra Hymen (a.k.a. Danielle Stampe) (Gwar, Girly Freak Show, Brothers Grim Sideshow)
- Mick Harris (Napalm Death, Scorn, Lull)
- Fallon Bowman (Amphibious Assault, Kittie)
- Keith Levene (The Clash, The Flowers of Romance, Public Image Ltd)
- Jason McNinch (Lick)
- Alex Welz (Lick)
- Krztoff (Bile, Black From the Dead, Napalm)
- Becky Wreck (Lunachicks)
- Mary Byker (Apollo 440, Gaye Bykers on Acid)
- Noko (Apollo 440, Magazine, The Cure)
- Andy Maguire (Spoon, Dogzilla)
- Martin King (Test Dept)
- Gus Ferguson (Test Dept)
- Curse Mackey (Grim Faeries, Evil Mothers)
- Christina Petro (My Life with the Thrill Kill Kult)
- Robert "BobDog" Catlin (S.A. Slayer, Juggernaut, Pseudo Buddha, Evil Mothers, Flesh Fetish)
- Algis A. Kiyzs (Swans)
- Marc Heal (Cubanate, C-Tec)
- Jamie Duffy (Acumen Nation, DJ? Acucrack)
- Marydee Reynolds (Chainsuck)
- Jeff Ward (Low Pop Suicide, Ministry, Revolting Cocks, Lard, Nine Inch Nails, 1000 Homo DJs)
- Mark Spybey (Dead Voices on Air)
- Lesley Rankine (Ruby, Silverfish)
- Andrew "Fuzz" Duprey (Silverfish)
- DJ Lumis (Bazerk)
- Matt Walker (Filter, The Smashing Pumpkins, Morrissey)
- Dirk Flanigan (77 Luscious Babes)
- JP Centera (Darkgroove)
- Eric Pounder (Lab Report, Pounder, Spasm)
- Hope Nicholls (Sugarsmack, Fetchin Bones)
- The Enigma (Human Marvels, Jim Rose Circus, Brothers Grim Sideshow, Show Devils)
- Leila Bela
- Barbara Hunter (Roundhead, The Afghan Whigs)
- Sally Timms (The Mekons)
- Mark Walk (Ruby, Skinny Puppy, ohGr)
- James Teitelbaum (Evil Clowns)
- Flour (Rifle Sport, Breaking Circus, Flour)
- Lee Popa (Slammin' Watusis)
- Obioma Little
- Sean Joyce (Ajax)
- Kim Ljung (Zeromancer, Seigmen)
- Alex Møklebust (Zeromancer)
- Dan Heide (Zeromancer, Ljungblut, Red 7, X-Pleasure)
- Martin Bowes (Attrition)
- Laurie Reade (Attrition, Black Tape for a Blue Girl, High Blue Star)
- Anders Odden (Magenta, Apoptygma Berzerk, Cadaver, Celtic Frost, Satyricon)
- Raziel Panic (You Shriek)
- Anna Wildsmith (Sow)
- Kirsten Reynolds (Project Dark)
- Cynthia Plaster Caster
- Joe Trump (Elliott Sharp's Carbon, Brian Brain)
- Mike Dillon (Les Claypool's Fancy Band, Ani DiFranco, Critters Buggin)
- David Suycott (Machines of Loving Grace)
- John Bergin (Trust Obey)
- Judd Gruenbaum (Dry Cell)
- Jason Miller (Godhead)
- Ullrich Hepperlin (Godhead)
- Mike Miller (Godhead)
- Julian Beeston (Nitzer Ebb, Cubanate)
- Günter Schulz (KMFDM)
- Fiona Kilpatrick (Dragster)
- Penn Jillette (Penn & Teller)
- Justin Broadrick (Godflesh, Jesu, Napalm Death)
- Tamar Berk (Sweet Heat, The Countdown)
- Steven Denekas (The Countdown, Submarine Races)
- Tristan Rudat (Blue Eyed Fools)
- Patrick Ryan (Blue Eyed Fools)
- Jeff Scheel (Gravity Kills)
- Greta Brinkman (Moby, Debbie Harry, Druglord)
- Gaelynn Lea
- Leyla I. Royale
- Andrew "Ndru" Virus (Doomsday Virus)
- Larry Thrasher (Psychic TV, Thee Majesty, Splinter Test)
- Bradley Bills (Chant)
- Orville Kline (Porn And Chicken)
- Randy Blythe (Lamb of God)
- Ali Jafri (Saintfield, Signs of the Unseen, Ariel, The Gotham City Drugstore)
- Bruce Lamont (Yakuza, Brain Tentacles)
- Justin Pearson (The Locust, Dead Cross, Retox)
- Add-2
- Leanne Murray (The Beer Nuts, Bile)
- Roger Ebner (Yeti Rain, Snarling Adjective Convention, Ebner Kopecky Walkner Blake, EbnerHunt & Friends)
- Jesse Hunt (62Latitude, EbnerHunt & Friends, Cyanotic, Conformco)
- Joe Letz (Combichrist)
- Phil Owen (Skatenigs)
- Betty X
- Jimi LaMort (Malhavoc)
- Chris Harris (Project .44, Conformco)
- Mike Reidy (W.O.R.M.)
- Mike Alonso (Flogging Molly)
- Rona Rougeheart (Sine, Dead Love Club)
- I Ya Toyah
- Neil Hubbard (Engram Records)
- Tom Lash (System 56, Lucky Pierre, Hot Tin Roof)

== Discography ==
=== Studio albums ===
- Gub (1991)
- Fook (1992)
- Notes From Thee Underground (1994)
- A New High in Low (1997)
- Easy Listening... (2003)
- 6 (2009)

== Bibliography ==
- Atkins, Martin (2007). Tour:Smart: And Break the Band. Soluble LLC. ISBN 978-0-9797313-0-3.
