= Invisible Records =

Record label based in Chicago, Illinois, US

Invisible Records is a Chicago based record label founded by Martin Atkins. In 1994, Invisible Records started a subsidiary label Underground Inc.

== Roster ==
- Ashtrayhead
- Attrition
- Bagman
- Bizarre Sex Trio
- Cherrie Blue
- Brian Brain
- Chemlab
- Alison Chesley
- Meg Lee Chin
- Chris Connelly
- The Damage Manual
- Dead Voices on Air
- Deezal Records
- Defragmentation
- Deist Requiem
- Dr. Speedlove
- Drug Test
- F.M. Einheit
- Evil Mothers
- Fall of Because
- Foetus
- Formate
- Gawk
- Genesis P-Orridge
- Grim Faeries
- Hellbent
- Hellsau
- Horsey
- Killing Joke
- Kill Switch...Klick
- Lab Report
- Lance Grabmiller
- Leechwoman
- Lick
- Jared Louche
- The Love Interest
- Martin Atkins and the Chicago Industrial League
- Matera
- More Machine Than Man
- Murder, Inc.
- My Life With The Thrill Kill Kult
- Nocturne
- Not Breathing
- Opium Jukebox
- Order of the Beak
- Phylr
- Pigface
- Pounder
- The Prayer Boat
- Riou
- Rx
- Scorn
- Sheep on Drugs
- SMP
- Sow
- Spasm
- Spyder
- Subgenius
- Sugarsmack
- Swans
- Test Dept.
- Things Outside the Skin
- Throbbing Gristle
- TRS-80
- Tub Ring
- TV Jesus and the Sister of Satan
- Voodou
