= The Best of British £1 Notes =

Greatest hits album by John Lydon
- Released: October 3, 2005
- Recorded: 1976–1997; 2005
- Genre: Punk rock, post-punk, alternative rock, alternative dance
- Label: Virgin
- Producer: John Lydon

John Lydon chronology
Psycho's Path (1997)	The Best of British £1 Notes (2005)

The Best of British £1 Notes is a compilation album and DVD by John Lydon showing his work not only with the Sex Pistols and Public Image Ltd (PiL) but also as a solo artist and collaborator and features "The Rabbit Song", a new song from his as yet unreleased second solo album. It was released by EMI and Virgin Records.

== Track listing ==
=== Standard CD edition ===
1. Sex Pistols – "Anarchy in the UK"
2. PiL – "Public Image"
3. PiL – "This Is Not a Love Song"
4. Leftfield/Lydon – "Open Up"
5. PiL – "Rise"
6. PiL – "Don't Ask Me"
7. PiL – "Seattle"
8. Sex Pistols – "Holidays in the Sun"
9. PiL – "Death Disco"
10. PiL – "Flowers of Romance"
11. Time Zone – "World Destruction"
12. PiL – "Warrior"
13. PiL – "Disappointed"
14. John Lydon – "Sun"
15. PiL – "Bad Life"
16. PiL – "Home"
17. PiL – "The Body"
18. PiL – "Cruel"
19. Sex Pistols – "God Save the Queen"
20. John Lydon – "The Rabbit Song"

=== CD special edition ===
==== Disc 1 ====
1. Sex Pistols – "Anarchy in the UK"
2. PiL – "Public Image"
3. PiL – "This is Not a Love Song"
4. Leftfield/Lydon – "Open Up"
5. PiL – "Rise"
6. PiL – "Don't Ask Me"
7. PiL – "Seattle"
8. Sex Pistols – "Holidays in the Sun"
9. PiL – "Death Disco"
10. PiL – "Flowers of Romance"
11. Time Zone – "World Destruction"
12. PiL – "Warrior"
13. PiL – "Disappointed"
14. John Lydon – "Sun"
15. PiL – "Bad Life"
16. PiL – "Home"
17. PiL – "The Body"
18. PiL – "Cruel"
19. Sex Pistols – "God Save the Queen"
20. John Lydon – "The Rabbit Song"

==== Disc 2 ====
1. PiL – "Death Disco" (12" Mix)
2. PiL – "Poptones"
3. PiL – "Careering"
4. PiL – "Religion"
5. PiL – "Banging the Door"
6. PiL – "The Pardon"
7. PiL – "Rise" (12" Mix)
8. PiL – "Disappointed" (12" Mix)
9. PiL – "Warrior" (12" Mix)
10. PiL – "Acid Drops"
11. Leftfield/Lydon – "Open Up" (Full Vocal Mix)
12. Sex Pistols – "God Save The Queen" (Dance Mix)

=== DVD ===
==== Music videos ====
1. Anarchy in the UK (original EMI version)
2. God Save The Queen
3. Public Image
4. Death Disco
5. This is Not a Love Song
6. Bad Life
7. World Destruction
8. Rise
9. Home
10. Seattle
11. The Body (uncensored version)
12. Warrior
13. Disappointed
14. Don't Ask Me (title version)
15. Cruel
16. Covered
17. Open Up
18. Sun

==== Video extras ====
Sex Pistols live tracks:

1. "Pretty Vacant" – Finsbury Park 1996
2. "Bodies" – Phoenix Festival 1996
3. "Silver Machine" – Crystal Palace 2002

==== Audio extras ====
Unreleased PiL Monitor Mixes:

1. "Death Disco" (unedited monitor mix)
2. "Albatross" (unedited monitor mix)
3. "Albatross" ('Melodrama' mix)
