= This Is PiL =

This is PiL

Studio album by Public Image Ltd
- Released: 28 May 2012
- Recorded: July–August 2011
- Studios: Wincraft Studios, Cotswolds, England
- Genres: Post-punk, experimental rock
- Length: 64:09
- Label: PiL Official Ltd
- Producer: Public Image Ltd

Public Image Ltd chronology
That What Is Not (1992)	This is PiL (2012)	What the World Needs Now... (2015)

This is PiL is the ninth studio album by British rock band Public Image Ltd. Their first studio album in 20 years, it was released on 28 May 2012 on band's own label, PiL Official. A limited deluxe edition of the album was released with a live DVD entitled There is a PiL in Heaven.

== Background ==
Public Image Ltd returned in 2009, after a 17-year hiatus. John Lydon financed the reunion using money he earned doing a UK TV commercial for Country Life butter. He said "The money that I earned from that has now gone completely – lock stock and barrel – into reforming PiL".

In November 2009, when asked if PiL would re-enter the studio to record new material Lydon said "Yes, if I raise the money from this [tour], I most definitely will." The new line-up (consisting of Lydon, earlier members Bruce Smith and Lu Edmonds, plus multi-instrumentalist Scott Firth) began touring in December 2009.

On 1 July 2011, PiL entered Steve Winwood's studio in the Cotswolds and began recording new material. Lydon said "it was the only place we could afford. It was this barn, in the middle of the Cotswolds, with nothing for inspiration but sheep – and I don't like sheep particularly." PiL left the studio in August and in September it was revealed that they had recently completed their new album.

In February 2012, it was officially announced that a 4 track EP entitled One Drop would be released for Record Store Day on 21 April and This Is PiL would be released on 28 May.

== Reception ==
Professional ratings
Aggregate scores
Source	Rating
Metacritic	66/100
Review scores
Source	Rating
AllMusic	3.5/5 stars
Drowned in Sound	8/10
The Guardian	4/5 stars
The Independent	2/5 stars
Mojo	4/5 stars
NME	7/10
Paste	4.0/10
Pitchfork	6.3/10
Slant	3/5 stars
Spin	8/10

Upon its release, This is PiL received mostly favourable reviews from music critics. At Metacritic, which assigns a normalised rating out of 100 to reviews from mainstream critics, the album received an average score of 66 based on 25 reviews, which indicates "generally favorable reviews". Alexis Petridis of The Guardian gave the album four out of five stars, stating that the album "both recalls their glory days and contradicts them at the same time". Mojo's Andrew Perry said "it's simply a joy to hear Lydon in fine voice, getting stuck into thorny matters with his unique, raw-nerve gusto, backed by a cookin' band".

Andrew Ryce of Pitchfork considered it "not terrible" and "hollow" but also as "a reminder of the band's former genius and a treat for longtime fans who should appreciate at least half the album as solid PiL work". Paste considered the arrangements as "dull, ordinary and unforgivably sluggish" before describing Lydon's voice as "a scratchy, breathless whimper".

In the United Kingdom, the album entered at number 35 at the end of the first week, before falling to number 89 on its second week.

== Track listing ==
No.	Title	Length
1.	"This is PiL"	3:39
2.	"One Drop"	4:51
3.	"Deeper Water"	6:07
4.	"Terra-Gate"	3:47
5.	"Human"	6:02
6.	"I Must be Dreaming"	4:13
7.	"It Said That"	4:08
8.	"The Room I Am in"	3:07
9.	"Lollipop Opera"	6:54
10.	"Fool"	5:52
11.	"Reggie Song"	5:48
12.	"Out of the Woods"	9:41

- The iTunes download of the album also features an exclusive 15-minute video filmed during the recording of the album at Steve Winwood's Cotswolds studio in 2011, directed, produced and filmed by John "Rambo" Stevens and Walter Jaquiss.

=== Deluxe edition bonus DVD – There is a PiL in Heaven ===
Live performance recorded at London, Heaven Nightclub, 2 April 2012

1. "Deeper Water"
2. "This Is Not a Love Song"
3. "Albatross"
4. "Reggie Song"
5. "Disappointed"
6. "Warrior"
7. "Religion"
8. "USLS1"
9. "Death Disco"
10. "Flowers of Romance"
11. "Lollipop Opera"
12. "Bags / Chant"
13. "Out of the Woods"
14. "One Drop"
15. "Rise"
16. "Open Up"

== Personnel ==
Public Image Ltd.

- John Lydon – lead vocals, production, cover art
- Lu Edmonds – guitar, backing vocals, saz, banjo, production
- Scott Firth – bass, backing vocals, synthesizer, production
- Bruce Smith – drums, backing vocals, production

== Charts ==
Chart (2012)	Peak position
Scottish Albums (Official Charts)	28
UK Albums (Official Charts)	35
UK Independent Albums (Official Charts)	4
