= Copkiller =

1983 Italian crime thriller film by Roberto Faenza

- VHS release cover under the alternative title Corrupt
- Directed by: Roberto Faenza
- Screenplay by: Ennio De Concini; Roberto Faenza; Hugh Fleetwood
- Based on: The Order of Death by Hugh Fleetwood
- Produced by: Elda Ferri; Roberto Cicutto
- Starring: Harvey Keitel; John Lydon; Sylvia Sidney; Leonard Mann; Nicole Garcia
- Cinematography: Giuseppe Pinori
- Edited by: Nino Baragli
- Music by: Ennio Morricone
- Production companies: Jean Vigo International; RAI; Aura Film
- Distributed by: Gaumont Italia
- Release dates: 15 March 1983 (Italy); 19 January 1984 (U.S.)
- Running time: 117 minutes
- Country: Italy
- Languages: English; Italian

Copkiller (Italian: Copkiller (L'assassino dei poliziotti)), also released as Corrupt, Corrupt Lieutenant, and The Order of Death, is a 1983 Italian crime thriller film directed by Roberto Faenza and starring Harvey Keitel and John Lydon, the lead singer for the bands Sex Pistols and Public Image Ltd. It is based on Hugh Fleetwood's 1977 novel The Order of Death, with a screenplay by Fleetwood, Faenza and Ennio De Concini. The music was composed by Ennio Morricone. The plot follows a psychological cat-and-mouse game between a corrupt police officer (Keitel) and a disturbed young man (Lydon) against the backdrop of murders committed by a serial killer who is targeting police officers.

The film was shot on-location in New York City and at Cinecittà Studios in Rome between March and April, 1982. It is Lydon's only starring role in film to date. Upon release, it received mixed-to-negative reviews from critics, and has since fallen into the public domain. It has since undergone a reevaluation, and has become a cult classic due to the presence of Keitel and Lydon, while being acknowledged as a precursor to Abel Ferrara's celebrated and similarly-themed film Bad Lieutenant (1992).

== Plot ==
Corrupt NYPD narcotics detectives Fred O'Connor and Bob Carvo spend their illegal earnings on an apartment, viewing it as an investment. However, friction forms between them, as Carvo feels guilty about their scams and wants to abandon their association, asking O'Connor to pay him his share of the apartment so he can sell it, despite O'Connor's reluctance.

O'Connor begins to notice a young man who follows him. The man eventually confronts O'Connor inside the secret apartment, claiming to be the perpetrator of various murders against members of the Narcotics Division, dubbed by the media as the "Copkiller". O'Connor dismisses his assertions due to his small stature and apparent physical weakness. The man gives his name as Fred Mason, but O'Connor cannot match the name to any on-record description. Mason threatens to go to the authorities about O'Connor's apartment, thereby exposing his corruption. Carvo insists on letting Mason go, and O'Connor seemingly agrees, paying Carvo his share of the apartment. O'Connor keeps Mason captive in its bathroom, binding him and reinforcing the door with a deadbolt.

Hoping to intimidate Mason into keeping silent, O'Connor tries to garner him into revealing details about his personal life. Mason eventually claims that his grandmother, a wealthy heiress, is looking for him, and his discovery and that O'Connor's exposure is inevitable. Based on news reports, O'Connor determines that Mason's real name is Leo Smith, and tracks down his grandmother Margaret on Staten Island. Margaret says that Leo came under her care after his parents' death, but felt guilty about the wealth he was now entitled to, and developed a self-loathing complex that led him to compulsively confess to heinous crimes he had no involvement in, seeking retribution over his self-inflicted guilt. O'Connor uncovers a secret tape recording by Leo that states his intention to confront O'Connor, thus revealing his location.

O'Connor returns to the apartment and destroys the tape but is confronted by Carvo who has discovered his scheme. Holding O'Connor at gunpoint, Carvo demands that he release Leo. O'Connor responds by striking him and knocking his head on a toilet seat. Telling Leo that he is still alive, he unties him and orders him to help transport his unconscious body to Central Park. Reiterating Leo's earlier claim to be the Copkiller, O'Connor orders him at gunpoint to slit Carvo's throat and kill him, making his death look like another one of the Copkiller's victims. Leo insists that he has never killed anyone, but eventually relents, only for O'Connor to pull the trigger. The gun misfires, and Leo takes the opportunity to flee. O'Connor realizes that Carvo's gun was unloaded.

O'Connor goes to work the next day wrought with guilt and paranoia, as investigators are baffled by the unusual circumstances of Carvo's death. Upon returning to the apartment, he is confronted by Leo. As Leo fled the scene of the murder, he is now suspected as either a witness or accomplice. O'Connor reluctantly allows Leo to stay in his apartment indefinitely. O'Connor's mental state further deteriorates as he descends into alcoholism, seeking comfort in the presence of Carvo's wife Lenore. She is a former fling of O'Connor's and still has feelings for him. Leo, meanwhile, sneaks out of the apartment to purchase a serrated knife identical to the one used by the Copkiller, and hides it in O'Connor's kitchen.

Leo chastises O'Connor for seeing Lenore, claiming that his feelings of guilt make a confession to her unavoidable. The two plot to murder her, Leo goading him by threatening to go the police. While O'Connor goes to Lenore's house, Leo dresses as a picture of his father and retrieves a hidden gym bag from a subway station locker. At her apartment, O'Connor cannot go through with Lenore's murder. He gives her Carvo's gun and confesses to the secret arrangement between the two, while falsely claiming that the apartment is far away from Central Park.

Upon returning to the apartment, a disheveled O'Connor finds the phone line cut and Leo bound and gagged in the bathtub. Untying him and trying to find the intruder in the house, he is instead confronted by Lenore, who berates him for lying to her and accuses him of killing Carvo. Leo emerges and claims that O'Connor is the Copkiller, held him hostage, and planned to kill both him and Lenore. She goes outside to call the police, while Leo reveals himself as the true Copkiller, having manipulated O'Connor from the very beginning to frame him. He gives O'Connor the knife and tells him to finish it, before dumping his killing paraphernalia from his gym bag into the closet. With nowhere to run, O'Connor slits his own throat just as Lenore and police backup burst in.

== Cast ==
- Harvey Keitel as Lt. Fred O'Connor
- John Lydon as Leo Smith/Fred Mason
- Nicole Garcia as Lenore Carvo
- Leonard Mann as Sgt. Bob Carvo
- Sylvia Sidney as Margaret Smith

== Release, distribution and alternative titles ==
The premiere in Italy was on March 15, 1983. New Line Cinema acquired the U.S. rights and released the film under the title Corrupt in New York City in January 1984. and the film slowly worked its way through art theatres for months after. Thorn EMI Screen Entertainment released the film on home video in America later in 1984 as part of a package they acquired from New Line. New Line also licensed the film for TV syndication to The Entertainment Network (a.k.a. TEN) along with other titles they then had rights to, including The Texas Chain Saw Massacre and The Cars That Ate Paris; the film was retitled Copkiller for television broadcast.

For undetermined reasons, after New Line's initial rights expired, the film became regarded as public domain in America. Scores of bad-quality copies have been floating around the market, usually either sourced from the Thorn EMI videotape, or a 16mm print of the edited-for-television TEN version. It has not only been offered under its UK titles The Order of Death or Order of Death (mostly in the United Kingdom), its US title Corrupt, or the alternate Cop Killer or Cop Killers titles, but also as Bad Cop Chronicles #2: Corrupt (from the VHS sleeve, part of the video series Bad Cop Chronicles) and Corrupt Lieutenant. The latter was devised after 1992 to capitalize on Abel Ferrara's Bad Lieutenant, a critically acclaimed film also featuring Harvey Keitel. On July 24, 2017, Code Red DVD released the film on Blu Ray in America, sourced from the original New Line Cinema elements, obtained directly from the Warner Bros. vault.

== Reception ==
Copkiller was reviewed on BBC 1's Film 83 as Order of Death. Well-known British film critic Barry Norman refers to Lydon's voice as a “speak-your-weight machine", and sums up by calling the movie "stupid".

In the book Harvey Keitel Movie Top Ten edited by Creation Books in 1999 and compiled by film author Jack Hunter, featuring his personal "Top Ten" of Keitel's best films or performances, there is a chapter dedicated to Copkiller. The chapter is written by film critic David Prothero, who describes the film as "undoubtedly one of Keitel's finest films". Prothero makes the link between Keitel's character in the film and his character in Bad Lieutenant. Another comparison he brings is the parallel relation between Copkiller and Lydon's role with the relation drawn from the film Performance and Mick Jagger's role there; Prothero describes the blurring of Lydon's stage persona with his onscreen character, stating that defining proofs about this hypothesis are Leo Smith's tantrums ala Johnny Rotten, his mixture of arrogance and cynicism and the fact that Lydon wears his own clothes throughout the film.

== Influence ==
=== Bad Lieutenant ===
Harvey Keitel's portrayal of a corrupt cop has been pointed out as a prototype of his subsequent character of The Lieutenant in the cult classic film Bad Lieutenant, because of their similarities; particularly in the depiction of self-blame. In the aforementioned chapter of Harvey Keitel Movie Top Ten, by David Prothero, this comparison is mentioned.

=== Public Image Ltd ===
John Lydon's Post-punk group Public Image Ltd (PiL) was supposed to score the soundtrack for the film and worked on the material with his band mates Keith Levene and Martin Atkins (over the phone, by long distance).

In early November 1982 PiL announced the imminent release of a new single, "Blue Water", and a six-track mini album, You Are Now Entering a Commercial Zone, on their new label, which was supposed to feature the unused/unreleased music made for Copkiller. Nevertheless and for some reason this did not happen, with the band instead choosing to continue recording a full-length album at South Park Studios.

In mid-1983 in PiL's absence, Keith Levene took the unfinished album tapes and did his own mix. He then flew over to London and presented them to Richard Branson as the finished new PiL album for Virgin Records: Commercial Zone. For his part, John Lydon decided to completely abandon the tapes and re-record the whole album from scratch with session musicians. This new version of Commercial Zone became This Is What You Want... This Is What You Get in 1984.

The song "The Order of Death" from This Is What You Want... This Is What You Get is a reference to the film. The line "This is what you want... This is what you get", which was used for the title of the album, appears both in the song "The Order of Death" and the novel of the same name.
