= Live in Tokyo (Public Image Limited album) =

Live album by Public Image Ltd
- Released: August 1983 (Japan); 26 September 1983 (UK); 14 July 1986 (USA)
- Recorded: 1–2 July 1983
- Venue: Nakano Sun Plaza Hall, Nakano, Nakano, Tokyo
- Genre: Post-punk
- Length: 45:50
- Label: Columbia
- Producer: Public Image Ltd

Public Image Ltd chronology
The Flowers of Romance (1981)	Live in Tokyo (1983)	This Is What You Want... This Is What You Get (1984)

Professional ratings
Review scores
Source	Rating
AllMusic	2/5 stars
Robert Christgau	C
The Rolling Stone Album Guide	2/5 stars
Spin Alternative Record Guide	1/10

Live in Tokyo is a 1983 live album released by Public Image Ltd as a 2-EP 45 RPM set. It was issued by Columbia Records in Japan and later reissued by Virgin Records in the UK and reached #28 on the British charts. A single-LP 33 RPM edition was later issued by Elektra Records in the US.

A 35-minute live videocassette from the same series of concerts was also issued by Columbia Records in Japan under the title Live '83.

Live in Tokyo was the world's first digitally recorded live album according to Martin Atkins and the band recorded the concerts specifically to use the new Japanese digital technology

== Reception ==
Geoff Orens of AllMusic felt that many of the songs were worse than their studio versions, calling it "resoundingly faceless and bland ", but found that "Religion" was the only one that added "something to the original version, with a new organ introduction and an astonishingly biting performance from Lydon. Ironically enough, because the group recorded with such sophisticated equipment, the sound is phenomenal, capturing a mediocre band in crisp, rich tones."

== Track listing ==
Side One

1. "Annalisa" – 5:17
2. "Religion II" – 5:49

Side Two

1. "Low-Life" – 2:47
2. "Solitaire" – 3:59
3. "Flowers of Romance" – 4:46

Side Three

1. "This Is Not a Love Song" – 6:27
2. "Swan Lake" – 5:06

Side Four

1. "Bad Life" – 4:44
2. "Banging the Door" – 4:55
3. "Under the House" – 1:56

== Personnel ==
Public Image Limited

- John Lydon - vocals
- Joseph Guida - guitar
- Louis Bernardi - bass
- Tommy Zvoncheck - keyboards
- Martin Atkins - drums

Technical

- Kenji Miura - cover photograph

== Charts ==
Chart (1983)	Peak position
Australian Albums (Kent Music Report)	92
UK Albums (OCC)	28
