= The Flowers of Romance =

The Flowers of Romance may refer to:

- "The Flowers of Romance" (song), a song by Sex Pistols
- "Flowers of Romance" (song), a 1980 song by Public Image Ltd
- The Flowers of Romance (British band), an early British punk rock band
- The Flowers of Romance (album), a 1981 album by Public Image Ltd
- The Flowers of Romance (Greek band), a Greek gothic rock band
- A manga by Atsushi Kamijo
