= This Is What You Want... This Is What You Get =

Studio album by Public Image Ltd
- Released: 6 July 1984
- Recorded: 1983–1984
- Studios: Maison Rouge Studios (London, England)
- Genres: Alternative dance; new wave; post-punk
- Length: 36:36
- Labels: Virgin; Elektra/Asylum
- Producer: Public Image Ltd

Public Image Ltd chronology
Live in Tokyo (1983)	This Is What You Want... This Is What You Get (1984)	Album (1986)

Professional ratings
Review scores
Source	Rating
AllMusic	2/5 stars
Christgau’s Consumer Guide	C+
The Rolling Stone Album Guide	2.5/5 stars

This Is What You Want... This Is What You Get is the fourth studio album by the English post-punk band Public Image Ltd, released on 6 July 1984 by Virgin Records. It includes the single "Bad Life" and a re-recorded version of a "This Is Not a Love Song", which had been a No. 5 UK and international hit when released as a single in 1983.

An early version of the album was released in 1984 by founding PiL guitarist Keith Levene as Commercial Zone. The album was then re-recorded after Levene's departure from the band, with no contributions from either Levene or bassist Pete R. Jones (who contributed to several tracks on Commercial Zone).

== Background ==
In early November 1982 PiL announced the imminent release of a new single, "Blue Water", and a six-track mini album, You Are Now Entering a Commercial Zone, on their new label, which was supposed to release the unused music for Copkiller (1983). This did not happen, with the band instead continuing to record a full-length album at Park South Studios.

In mid-1983, in PiL's absence, Keith Levene took the unfinished album tapes and did his own mix. He then flew over to London and presented them to Richard Branson as the finished new PiL album for Virgin Records: Commercial Zone. For his part, John Lydon decided to completely abandon the tapes and re-record the whole album from scratch with session musicians. This new version of Commercial Zone became This Is What You Want... This Is What You Get in 1984.

Five songs on This Is What You Want... This Is What You Get are re-recordings of tracks which originally appeared on Commercial Zone: "Bad Life" (originally titled "Mad Max"), "This Is Not a Love Song" (originally titled "Love Song"), "Solitaire" (entitled "Young Brits" on the second pressing of Commercial Zone), "The Order of Death" (originally titled "The Slab"), and "Where Are You?" (originally titled "Lou Reed Part 2"). Four songs from Commercial Zone, "Bad Night", "Lou Reed Part 1", "Blue Water" and "Miller Hi-Life", were not re-recorded for This Is What You Want... This Is What You Get (although a remixed version of "Blue Water" was included as the B-side on the "This Is Not a Love Song" 12" single). Songs on This Is What You Want... This Is What You Get which did not appear in any form on Commercial Zone are "Tie Me to the Length of That", "The Pardon" and "1981", and are the only songs on the album which do not credit Keith Levene as a co-writer.

== Select track commentary by the band ==
"Bad Life"
John Lydon (1984): "It was originally 'Bad Life', then it went to 'Mad Max'. There were two sets of lyrics, see, for the same song. Well, things got a bit haywire but we were going to put out the same song with different lyrics as a- and b-side [of the 'Bad Life' single]. But that never came to pass." "We gave [Keith Levene songwriting] credit for that but we'd sacked him before the album was even started. You know, it was just on good faith. Many of the songs were written before he quit, but his participation in all honesty was zero."
"This Is Not a Love Song"
John Lydon (1992/99): "At the time people were saying that I'd joined big business and become a bourgeois shit. So I thought the best way of tackling this would be to pump out a song saying 'That's exactly what I am!' Tongue firmly in cheek. And that kind of stopped that nonsense – so it worked." "'This Is Not A Love Song' was a sort of response to that constant request from the record company for those HITS. Someone said 'Why don't you write a love song?' Ha, I said, love song – ehh, well, this is not a love song!"
"Tie Me to the Length of That"
John Lydon (1992): "That was about being born [...] I don't know why they slap their bottoms, I think it's enormously cruel. It might have influenced me, is what I'm trying to say. Maybe they slapped the wrong end, they couldn't tell my arse from my head!"
Martin Atkins (2009): "Things like 'Tie Me to The Length of That', we just jammed. John played this thing that was like a cross between a mellotron and an electric organ, and we got some great sounds out of it. He played this walking, ever changing bassline and I drummed to it, and I felt that we were just totally connected at that point – every time he changed I was there with him, I'd change and he'd be there."
"The Pardon"
John Lydon (1999): "I was just saying something about most people's lack of desire for change. I like change, but not just for change's sake."
"Where Are You?"
John Lydon (1992) "[Working with session musicians], there's no give and take in that. It's just me giving orders and them receiving them. There was no feedback. If I had a crap idea, the crap idea would go on to vinyl almost directly!"
"1981"
Martin Atkins (2001): “'1981', that went on the 'This Is What You Want' album, was written for The Flowers of Romance [...] It's from 1981, that's what John was singing about."

"This Is Not a Love Song" (Club Mix)
Martin Atkins (2001): "I really thought the 'Plastic Box' could have really been a great thing for the fans, it didn't have to be shit. I think really all that's on 'Plastic Box' that's a different mix is the version 'This Is Not a Love Song'."

== In popular culture ==
PiL was supposed to score the soundtrack for the Italian crime thriller film Copkiller (1983), starring Harvey Keitel and John Lydon, who worked on the material with his bandmates Keith Levene and Martin Atkins (over the phone, by long distance). The line "This is what you want... This is what you get" appears in both "Bad Life" and "The Order of Death". "The Order of Death" is a reference to the film Copkiller, also known as The Order of Death. The line "This is what you want... This is what you get", which gives the album its title, appears in the film.

The song "The Order of Death" appears in the 1990 science fiction-horror film Hardware and on the soundtrack to the 1999 horror film The Blair Witch Project. It was also featured in the Miami Vice episode "Little Miss Dangerous", the Mr. Robot episode "eps2.7_init_5.fve", and the Industry episode "There Are Some Women...". It also appears in Season 2 Episode 6 of The Umbrella Academy when the Hargreeves siblings take the elevator to the Tiki Lounge to meet with their father. It appears in the 2021 film Happily. It appears in the 2023 remake of System Shock as the music for the end credits. In 2025, it appeared in the movie Freaky Tales. It also appears in the 2025 film Marty Supreme. The song also appears in the episode "Live Free and Die" in the second season of "Dexter: Resurrection".

"This is Not a Love Song" appears in the film Waltz with Bashir (2008).

== Critical reception ==
The album was seen as a step down from the band's efforts. Pitchfork named the album "maligned but salvageable". AllMusic said the album as "the most tentative and least powerful of PiL's recordings."

== Track listing ==
Side one
No.	Title	Writer(s)	Length
1.	"Bad Life"	John Lydon; Keith Levene; Martin Atkins	5:15
2.	"This Is Not a Love Song"	Lydon; Levene; Atkins	4:12
3.	"Solitaire"	Lydon; Levene; Atkins	3:59
4.	"Tie Me to the Length of That"	Lydon; Atkins	5:17

Side two
No.	Title	Writer(s)	Length
1.	"The Pardon"	Lydon; Atkins	5:19
2.	"Where Are You?"	Lydon; Levene; Atkins	4:18
3.	"1981"	Lydon; Atkins	3:17
4.	"The Order of Death"	Lydon; Levene; Atkins	4:59
Total length:			36:36

== Personnel ==
Public Image Ltd

- John Lydon – vocals, synth bass, violin, brass, synthesiser, keyboards, percussion
- Martin Atkins – drums, percussion, synth bass, guitar, keyboards

Additional personnel

- Colin Woore – guitar
- Louis Bernardi – bass
- Richard Cottle – keyboards
- Gary Barnacle – brass, keyboards

== Charts ==
Chart (1984)	Peak position
UK Albums (Official Charts)	56
