= End of World =

Studio album by Public Image Ltd
- Released: 11 August 2023
- Recorded: 2018; 2022
- Length: 50:42
- Label: PiL Official
- Producer: Lu Edmonds; Scott Firth; John Lydon; Bruce Smith; Rambo Stevens; James Towler

Public Image Ltd chronology
| What the World Needs Now... (2015) | End of World (2023) |

Singles from End of World
- 1. "Hawaii" Released: 9 January 2023; 2. "Penge" Released: 11 April 2023; 3. "Car Chase" Released: 22 June 2023

End of World is the eleventh studio album by the English rock band Public Image Ltd, released on 11 August 2023 by PiL Official.

== Recording and release ==
End of World is the first studio album by Public Image Ltd following the death of lead vocalist John Lydon's wife Nora Forster and was promoted with the lead single "Hawaii", a tribute to her. The full release was revealed on 11 April 2023, along with second single "Penge". "Car Chase" was released on 22 June as well. The band also promoted the album with a concert tour, which started that September.

== Critical reception ==
Professional ratings
Aggregate scores
| Source | Rating |
|---|---|
| Metacritic | 68/100 |
Review scores
| Source | Rating |
| AllMusic | 3/5 stars |
| The Arts Desk | 4/5 stars |
| Classic Rock | 4/5 stars |
| The Daily Telegraph | 4/5 stars |
| Mojo | 4/5 stars |
| musicOMH | 3/5 stars |
| The Observer | 3/5 stars |
| Pitchfork | 6.7/10 |
| Record Collector | 4/5 stars |
| Uncut | 6/10 |

According to the review aggregator Metacritic, End of World received "generally favorable reviews" based on a weighted average score of 68 out of 100 from 10 critic scores. At The Arts Desk, Graham Fuller rated this 4 out of 5 stars, writing that it maintains the momentum of the band's past two albums. The Daily Telegraph's Andrew Perry listed this among the albums of the week and scored it 4 out of 5 stars, calling it "definitely Lydon's most approachable album ever". In The Irish Examiner, Ed Power gave this album 4 out of 5 stars for mixing "as raw a depiction of grief as you'll hear" on "Hawaii" with "rollicking fury" and some "riotous triumph". Edwin McFee of Hot Press considered this release a 6 out of 10, noting the different stylistic shifts in the music. Louder Than War's Tim Cooper wrote that "the best moments are the more musically adventurous ones" on this album and also complains that "there's a plodding, leaden feel to much of the music on these 13 songs and a plodding, leaden mood to Lydon's lyrical preoccupations, which tend towards the old-white-man variety: either complaining, usually about the evils of the modern world, the young people that live in it, wokeness; or just vacuous and silly, and occasionally inappropriate". David Murphy of musicOMH scored End of World 3 out of 5 stars, opining that "Lydon sounds cracking for the most part, but the music is rather less consistent". Reviewing the album, in The Observer, Phil Mongredien commented, "John Lydon and band once again veer between hit and miss, from the poignantly affecting to the particularly annoying... As with all of PiL's recent albums, End of World is frustratingly hit and miss". Ben Cardew, writing for Pitchfork rated this release a 6.7 out of 10, stating that Lydon's "voice remains captivating—and, occasionally, surprisingly moving" and particularly praising "Hawaii" as "the rare PiL song since their 2009 reunion where the music lives up to the vocals' ingenuity and character".

Mojo ranked this the 65th best album of 2023. This was included in BrooklynVegan's listing of 33 great albums from indie/alternative legends.

== Track listing ==
All lyrics are written by John Lydon; all music is composed by Lu Edmonds, Scott Firth, John Lydon, and Bruce Smith.

1. "Penge" – 3:04
2. "End of the World" – 5:26
3. "Car Chase" – 3:45
4. "Being Stupid Again" – 4:32
5. "Walls" – 3:20
6. "Pretty Awful" – 4:51
7. "Strange" – 3:32
8. "Down On the Clown" – 4:20
9. "Dirty Murky Delight" – 2:29
10. "The Do That" – 2:37
11. "L F C F" – 4:36
12. "North West Passage" – 4:39
13. "Hawaii" – 3:31

Japan bonus track

14. "Punkenstein"

== Personnel ==
Public Image Ltd

- Lu Edmonds – guitar, production
- Scott Firth – bass guitar, production
- John Lydon – vocals, production
- Bruce Smith – drums, production

Technical

- Brendan Davies – mixing, engineering
- Stefan Heger – mastering
- George Perks – engineering assistance
- John "Rambo" Stevens – production
- Danny Thomas – engineering assistance
- James Towler – production, mixing, engineering

== Chart performance ==
Chart performance for End of World
| Chart | Peak | Duration (weeks) |
|---|---|---|
| German Albums (Offizielle Top 100) | 54 | 1 |
| Scottish Albums (OCC) | 5 | 6 |
| UK Albums (OCC) | 33 | 1 |
| UK Independent Albums (OCC) | 4 | 6 |

== See also ==
- 2023 in British music
- List of 2023 albums
