= Psycho's Path =

Studio album by John Lydon
- Released: June 17, 1997
- Genres: Alternative rock, alternative dance
- Length: 72:22
- Label: Virgin
- Producers: John Lydon; Leftfield; Moby; Danny Saber; Mark Saunders

John Lydon chronology
Psycho's Path (1997)	The Best of British £1 Notes (2005)

Psycho's Path is a studio album by John Lydon, released by Virgin Records in 1997. It is his only solo album. Lydon sang on all the songs and played most of the instruments, with additional guitars and keyboards supplied by Martin Lydon and Mark Saunders.

== Production ==
The album was mostly recorded in John Lydon's basement studio at his home in Los Angeles. Several remixes from the Chemical Brothers, Moby, Leftfield and Danny Saber were added to the album at the request of Virgin Records to lengthen the album and attract the listeners of the dance-club hit "Open Up" by Leftfield, which was remixed by the Chemical Brothers for the album.

== Release ==
Virgin Records released the album and gave little, if any, commercial support for its release. A tour supporting the album was started and ended after only a few dates because of Lydon's anger for the lack of support.

== Music video ==
A music video for "Sun" was created with Lydon dancing and lip-synching in front of a blue screen. The video's premise is that of postcards which tell the story of a man who poisons his adulterous wife and ends up dancing on her grave. The Leftfield mix of the song was used for the music video, instead of Lydon’s original.

== Critical reception ==
Professional ratings
Review scores
Source	Rating
AllMusic	2.5/5 stars
NME	2/10
Rolling Stone	3/5 stars

Rolling Stone wrote that the album "features [Lydon's] most dissonant noises since PiL's 1981 The Flowers of Romance (album)."

== Track listing ==
All songs written by John Lydon.

1. "Grave Ride" – 4:27
2. "Dog" – 5:22
3. "Psychopath" – 4:29
4. "Sun" – 3:57
5. "Another Way" – 6:08
6. "Dis-Ho" – 4:43
7. "Take Me" – 3:11
8. "A No and a Yes" – 5:56
9. "Stump" – 4:51
10. "Armies" – 3:30
11. "Open Up" (The Chemical Brothers Mix Edit) – 4:58
12. "Grave Ride" (Moby Mix) – 6:32
13. "Sun" (Leftfield Mix) – 4:13
14. "Psychopath" (Leftfield Mix) – 4:18
15. "Stump" (Danny Saber Mix) – 5:47

== Personnel ==
- John Lydon – production, vocals, keyboards, guitar, bass guitar, drums, percussion, programming
- Martin Lydon – engineering, guitar, keyboards
- Mark Saunders – production, guitar, keyboards
