= Commercial zone =

Commercial zone may refer to:

- Commercial area, an area zoned for commercial development
- Commercial zoning, the practice of designating an area for commercial development
- Commercial Zone, an album by Public Image Limited
