= John "Rambo" Stevens =

English music producer and manager (1957–2023)

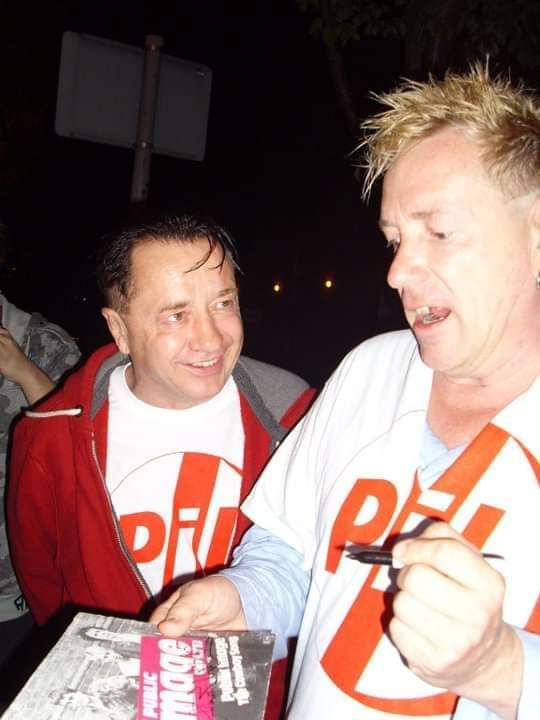
- John "Rambo" Stevens (left) and John Lydon in 2023
- Born: February 14, 1957; London, England
- Died: December 11, 2023 (aged 66); United States
- Occupations: Record producer; manager
- Spouse: Laura Dollins (2000–2023)

John "Rambo" Stevens (14 February 1957 – 11 December 2023) was an English record producer and manager. He was notable for his long-term association with John Lydon and produced several albums for Public Image Ltd.

== Life and career ==
John Stevens was born in north London on 14 February 1957.

After leaving school, Stevens first apprenticed with a jeweler and then joined the military. He was part of the Parachute Regiment, where he acquired his Rambo nickname.

Stevens eventually became a personal assistant and manager of John Lydon. The two met during their childhood, and grew up together in Finsbury Park, London.

Stevens produced the Public Image Ltd studio albums This Is PiL (2012), What the World Needs Now... (2015) and End of World (2023). He also produced documentaries about PiL and the Sex Pistols.

In 2000, Stevens married Laura Dollins, an American he had met in Memphis four years earlier. Lydon was his best man.

Stevens died from an aortic heart dissection in the United States on 11 December 2023, at the age of 66.
