= John Lydon =

English musician, author and media personality (born 1956)

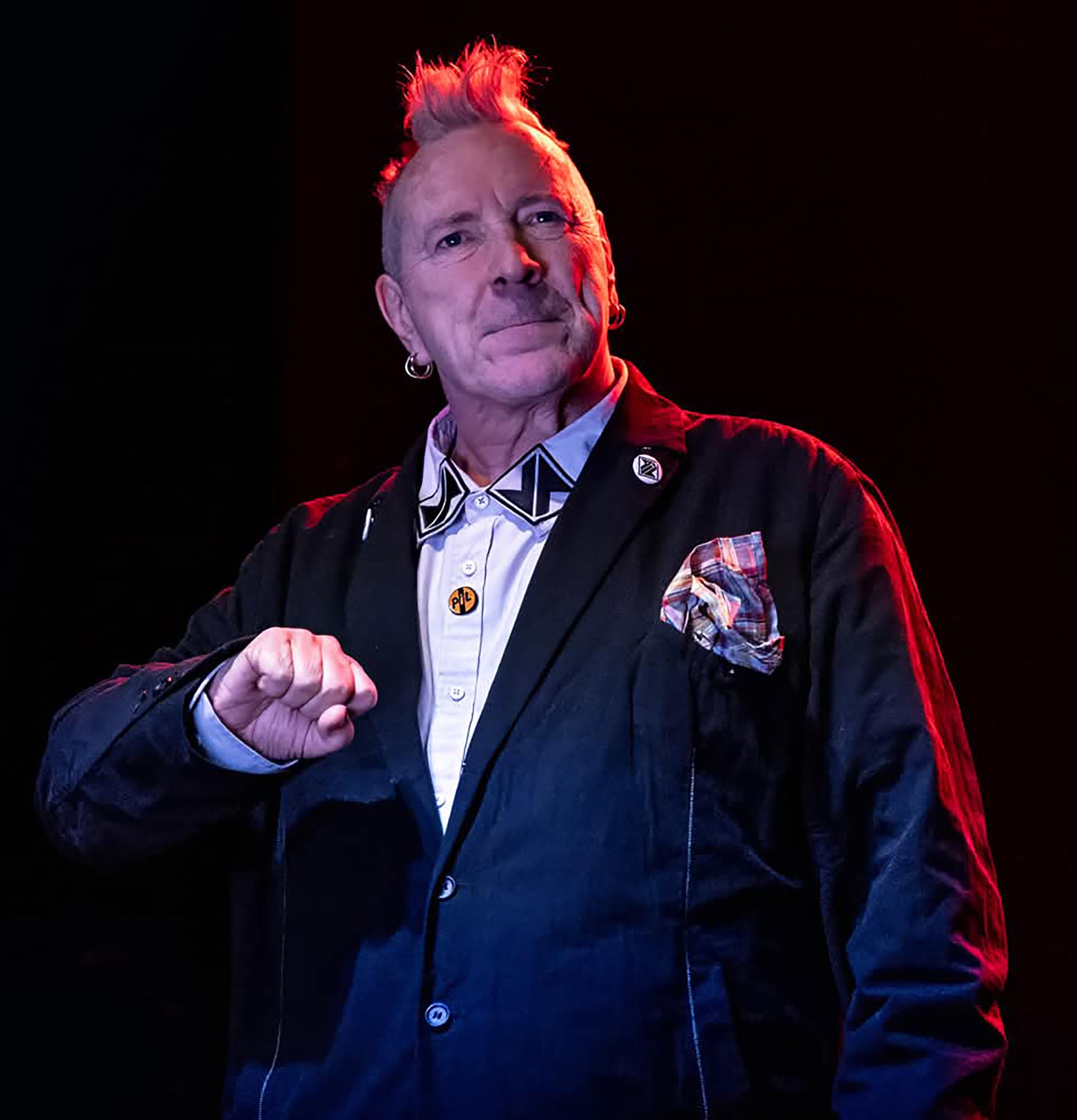
- Lydon performing in 2025

Background information
- Also known as: Johnny Rotten
- Born: John Joseph Lydon; 31 January 1956 (age 70); London, England
- Genres: Punk rock; post-punk; alternative dance; experimental rock; new wave; dub; avant-funk
- Occupations: Singer; songwriter; author; television personality
- Years active: 1975–present
- Member of: Public Image Ltd
- Formerly of: Sex Pistols
- Spouse: Nora Forster (m. 1979; died 2023)
- Website: johnlydon.com

John Joseph Lydon (/ˈlaɪdən/ LY-dən; born 31 January 1956), also known by his former stage name Johnny Rotten, is an English singer, songwriter, author, and television personality. He was the lead vocalist of the punk rock band the Sex Pistols, which was active from 1975 to 1978, and again for various revivals during the 1990s and 2000s. He is also the lead vocalist and the only consistent member of post-punk band Public Image Ltd (PiL), which he founded and fronted from 1978 until 1992, and again since 2009.

Lydon's outspoken personality, rebellious image and fashion style convinced Sex Pistols manager Malcolm McLaren to invite Lydon to join the group as its lead vocalist. With the Sex Pistols, he co-wrote singles including "Anarchy in the U.K.", "God Save the Queen", and "Holidays in the Sun", the content of which precipitated what one commentator described as the "last and greatest outbreak of pop-based moral pandemonium" in Britain. The band scandalised much of the media, and Lydon was seen as a figurehead of the burgeoning punk movement. Due to their controversial lyrics and disrepute at the time, they are regarded as one of the most influential acts in the history of popular music.

After the Sex Pistols disbanded in 1978, Lydon founded his own band, Public Image Ltd, which was far more experimental in nature and described in a 2005 review by NME as "arguably the first post-rock group". The band produced eight studio albums and a string of singles, including "Public Image", "Death Disco", and "Rise", before they went on hiatus in 1993, reforming in 2009. In subsequent years, Lydon has hosted television series in the UK, US, and Belgium, in 2004 appeared on I'm a Celebrity...Get Me Out of Here! in the UK, appeared in advertisements on UK television promoting Country Life, a brand of British butter, written two autobiographies, and produced solo musical work, such as the studio album Psycho's Path (1997). In 2005, he released a compilation album, The Best of British £1 Notes.

== Early life ==
I view myself as British first and foremost. When my parents came over from Ireland they became intrinsically working-class English. [I'm] proper London working-class.

— John Lydon (2013)

John Joseph Lydon was born in London on 31 January 1956. His parents, Eileen Mary (née Barry, 1932–1978), and John Christopher Lydon (1933–2008), were working-class immigrants from Ireland who moved into a two-room Victorian flat in Benwell Road, in the Holloway area of north London. The location is now adjacent to the new home ground of premier league football club Arsenal F.C. of whom Lydon has been an avid fan since the age of four. At the time, the area was largely impoverished, with a high crime rate and a population consisting predominantly of working-class Irish and Jamaican people. Lydon spent summer holidays in his mother's native County Cork, where he suffered name-calling for having an English accent, a prejudice he claims he still receives today even though he travels under an Irish passport. When Lydon was eleven (1967), the family moved into a council flat on the Honeyfield Six Acres Estate, in Finsbury Park.

In his autobiography, Rotten – No Irish, No Blacks, No Dogs (1993), Lydon wrote of being from an Irish background in London in the 1960s: "Londoners had no choice but to accept the Irish because there were so many of us, and we do blend in better than the Jamaicans. When I was very young and going to school, I remember bricks thrown at me by English parents... We were the Irish scum. But it's fun being scum, too."

Lydon, the eldest of four brothers, had to look after his siblings due to his mother's regular illnesses. As a child, he lived on the edge of an industrial estate and would often play with friends in the factories when they were closed. He belonged to a local gang of neighbourhood children and would often end up in fights with other groups, something he would later look back on with fond memories: "Hilarious fiascoes, not at all like the knives and guns of today. The meanness wasn't there. It was more like yelling, shouting, throwing stones, and running away giggling. Maybe the reality was coloured by my youth." Describing himself as a "very shy" and "very retiring" kid who was "nervous as hell", he hated going to school, (Sacred Heart Primary School, Eden Grove, Holloway ) where he would get caned as punishment and where he "had several embarrassing incidents ... I would shit my pants and be too scared to ask the teacher to leave the class. I'd sit there in a pants load of poo all day long."

At the age of seven, Lydon contracted spinal meningitis and spent a year in St Ann's Hospital in Haringey, London. Throughout the entire experience, he suffered from hallucinations, nausea, headaches, periods of coma, and a severe memory loss that lasted for four years, whilst the treatments administered by the nurses involved drawing fluid out of his spine with a surgical needle, leaving him with a permanent spinal curvature. The meningitis was responsible for giving him what he would later describe as the "Lydon stare"; this experience was "the first step that put me on the road to Rotten".

The other squatters hated us ... because of the way we looked—short cropped hair and old suits. That's when Sid [Vicious] started to come around to my way of fashion. I gave him his first decent haircut, which was the punk style as it soon became. You'd literally cut chunks of hair out of your head. The idea was to not have any shape to your hairdo—just have it fucked up. This was the beginning of it all.

— John Lydon (1993)

With his father often away, employed variously on building sites or oil rigs, Lydon got his first job aged ten as a minicab dispatcher, something he kept up for a year while the family was in financial difficulty. He disliked his secondary school, the St. William of York Roman Catholic School in Islington, where initially he was bullied, but at fourteen or fifteen he "broke out of the mould" and began to fight back at what he saw as the oppressive nature of the school teachers, who he felt instigated and encouraged the children to all be the same and be "anti-anyone-who-doesn't-quite-fit-the-mould". Following the completion of his O-Level examinations, he got into a row with his father, who disliked Lydon's long hair, and so, agreeing to get it cut, the teenager not only had it cut, but in an act of rebellion, he dyed it bright green. As a teenager, he listened to rock bands like Hawkwind, Captain Beefheart, Alice Cooper, and the Stooges – bands his mother also used to like, which somewhat embarrassed him – as well as more mainstream acts such as David Bowie, T. Rex, Slade and Gary Glitter.

Lydon was expelled from school at the age of fifteen after a run-in with a teacher, and went on to attend Hackney College, where he befriended Simon John Ritchie, before attending Kingsway College on the Gray's Inn Road. Lydon gave Ritchie the nickname "Sid Vicious", after his parents' pet hamster. Lydon and Vicious began squatting in a derelict residential building in Hampstead (New Court, Flask Walk) with a group of ageing hippies and stopped bothering to go to college, which was far away from where they were living. Meanwhile, he began working on construction sites during the summer, facilitated by his father. Friends recommended him for a job at a children's play centre in Finsbury Park, teaching woodwork to some of the older children, but he was dismissed when parents complained that somebody "weird" with bright-green hair was teaching their children. Lydon and his friends, including Vicious, John Gray, Jah Wobble, Dave Crowe and Tony Purcell, began going to many of the London clubs, such as the Lacy Lady in Seven Kings, and frequented both reggae and gay clubs, enjoying the latter because "you could be yourself, nobody bothered you" there.. Lydon did well academically completing the UK O Level and A Level examinations preparatory for university.

== Career ==
=== 1975–1978: Sex Pistols and the punk movement ===
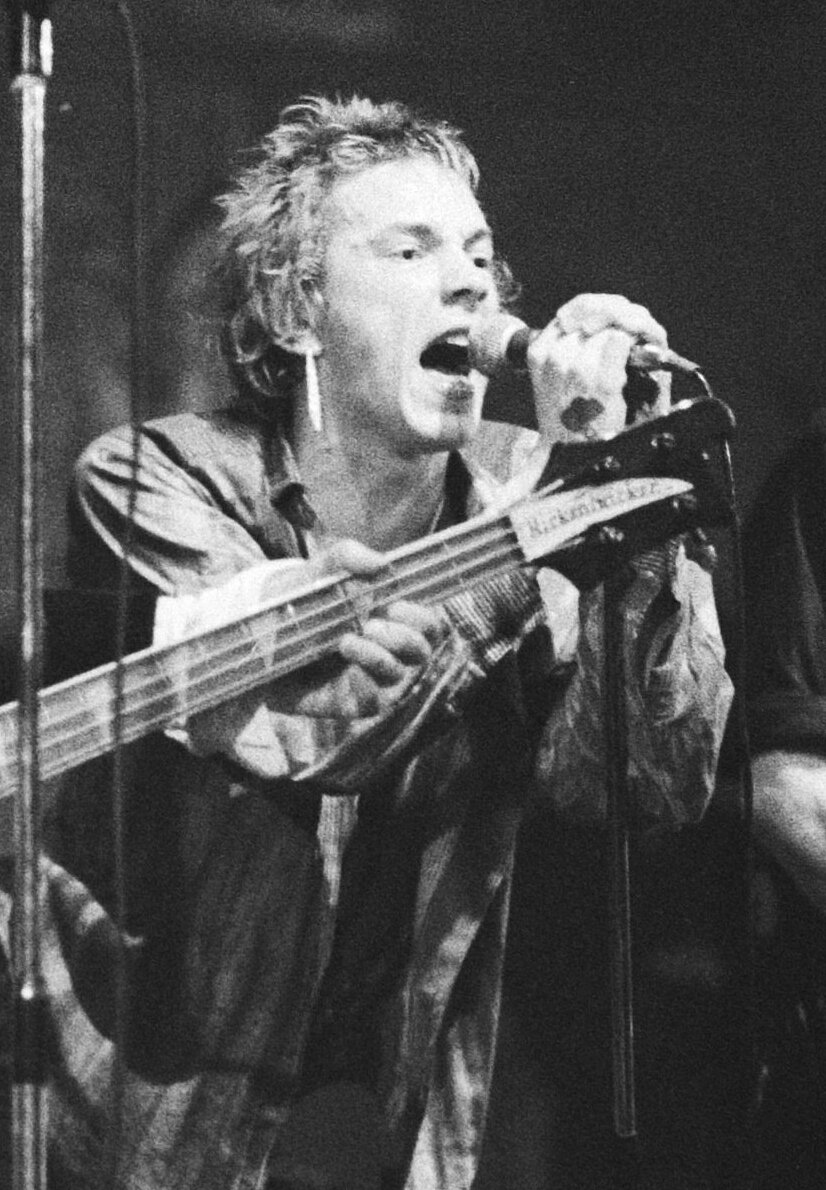
Lydon performing with the Sex Pistols in 1977

In 1975, Lydon was among a group of youths who regularly hung around Malcolm McLaren and Vivienne Westwood's fetish clothing shop Sex. McLaren had returned from a brief stint touring with American proto-punk band the New York Dolls, and he was working on promoting a new band formed by Steve Jones, Glen Matlock and Paul Cook called the Sex Pistols. McLaren was impressed with Lydon's ragged look and unique sense of style, particularly his orange hair and modified Pink Floyd T-shirt (with the band members' eyes scratched out and the words I Hate scrawled in felt-tip pen above the band's logo). After tunelessly singing Alice Cooper's "I'm Eighteen" to the accompaniment of the shop's jukebox, Lydon was chosen as the band's lead vocalist. In August 1977, the band released "God Save the Queen" during the week of Queen Elizabeth II's silver jubilee. At that time, Lydon commented: "Turn the other cheek too often and you get a razor through it." During the media furore over the single, Lydon and producers Bill Price and Chris Thomas were subject to a razor attack outside a pub in Highbury, London.

Lydon was interested in dub music. McLaren was said to have been upset when Lydon revealed during a radio interview that his influences included progressive experimentalists like Magma, Can, Captain Beefheart and Van der Graaf Generator. Tensions between Lydon and bassist Glen Matlock arose. The reasons for this are disputed, but Lydon claimed in his autobiography that he believed Matlock to be too white-collar and middle-class and that Matlock was "always going on about nice things like the Beatles". Matlock stated in his own autobiography that most of the tension in the band, and between himself and Lydon, was orchestrated by McLaren. Matlock quit and as a replacement, Lydon recommended his school friend Simon John Ritchie, who used the stage name Sid Vicious. Although Vicious was an incompetent bassist, McLaren agreed that he had the look the band wanted: pale, emaciated, spike-haired, with ripped clothes and a perpetual sneer. In 1977, the Sex Pistols released their only and highly influential studio album Never Mind the Bollocks, Here's the Sex Pistols.

Vicious' chaotic relationship with girlfriend Nancy Spungen, and his worsening heroin addiction, caused a great deal of friction among the band members, particularly with Lydon, whose sarcastic remarks often exacerbated the situation. Lydon closed the final Sid Vicious-era Sex Pistols concert in San Francisco's Winterland in January 1978 with a rhetorical question to the audience: "Ever get the feeling you've been cheated?" Shortly thereafter, McLaren, Jones, and Cook went to Brazil to meet and record with former train robber Ronnie Biggs. Lydon declined to go, deriding the concept as a whole and feeling that they were attempting to make a hero out of a criminal who attacked a train driver and stole "working-class money".

The Sex Pistols' disintegration was documented in Julien Temple's satirical pseudo-biographical film, The Great Rock 'n' Roll Swindle (1980), in which Jones, Cook and Vicious each played a character. Matlock only appeared in previously recorded live footage and as an animation and did not participate personally. Lydon refused to have anything to do with it, feeling that McLaren had far too much control over the project. Although Lydon was highly critical of the film, many years later he agreed to let Temple direct the Sex Pistols documentary The Filth and the Fury (2000), a film that included new interviews with the band members' faces hidden in silhouette, and also featured an uncharacteristically emotional Lydon choking up as he discussed Vicious' decline and death. Lydon had previously denounced previous journalistic works regarding the Sex Pistols in the introduction to his autobiography, Rotten – No Irish, No Blacks, No Dogs, which he described as "as close to the truth as one can get".

Lydon is portrayed by Anson Boon in the 2022 Craig Pearce–Danny Boyle FX biographical drama miniseries Pistol.

=== 1978–1993: Public Image Ltd (PiL) ===
In 1978, Lydon formed the post-punk band Public Image Ltd (PiL). The first line-up of the band included bassist Jah Wobble, drummer Jim Walker, and former Clash guitarist Keith Levene. They released the studio albums Public Image: First Issue (1978), Metal Box (1979) and the live album Paris au Printemps (1980). Wobble left and Lydon and Levene made The Flowers of Romance (1981). This was followed by This Is What You Want... This Is What You Get (1984) featuring Martin Atkins on drums (he had also appeared on Metal Box and The Flowers of Romance); it featured their biggest hit, "This Is Not a Love Song", which hit No. 5 in the UK Singles Chart in 1983.

In 1983, Lydon co-starred with Harvey Keitel in the Italian crime thriller film Copkiller, also released as Corrupt, Corrupt Lieutenant and The Order of Death. He later had a small role in the mockumentary comedy film The Independent (2000).

In 1984, Lydon worked with Time Zone on their single "World Destruction". A collaboration between Lydon, Afrika Bambaataa and producer and bassist Bill Laswell, this was an early example of rap rock, along with Run-DMC. The song appears on Bambaataa's 1997 compilation album Zulu Groove, and was arranged by Laswell after Lydon and Bambaataa had acknowledged respect for each other's work, as described in an interview from 1984:

Afrika Bambaataa: I was talking to Bill Laswell saying I need somebody who's really crazy, man, and he thought of John Lydon. I knew he was perfect because I'd seen this movie that he'd made [Copkiller], I knew about all the Sex Pistols and Public Image stuff, so we got together and we did a smashing crazy version, and a version where he cussed the Queen something terrible, which was never released. John Lydon: We went in, put a drum beat down on the machine and did the whole thing in about four-and-a-half hours. It was very, very quick.

The single featured keyboardist Bernie Worrell, guitarist Nicky Skopelitis and percussionist Aïyb Dieng, all of whom would later play on PiL's Album; Laswell played bass and produced. In 1986, Public Image Ltd released Album (also known as Compact Disc and Cassette depending on the format). Most of the tracks were written by Lydon and Bill Laswell, and the musicians were session musicians including bassist Jonas Hellborg, guitarist Steve Vai and Cream drummer Ginger Baker.

In 1987, a new line-up was formed consisting of Lydon, former Siouxsie and the Banshees guitarist John McGeoch, Allan Dias on bass guitar in addition to drummer Bruce Smith and Lu Edmunds. This line-up released Happy? and all except Lu Edmunds released the album 9 in 1989. In 1992, Lydon, Dias and McGeoch were joined by Curt Bisquera on drums and Gregg Arreguin on rhythm guitar for the album That What Is Not, which featured the Tower of Power horns on two songs and Jimmie Wood on harmonica. Lydon, McGeoch and Dias wrote the song "Criminal" for the film Point Break (1991). After this album, in 1993, Lydon put PiL on indefinite hiatus.

=== 1993–2006: Solo studio album, autobiography and celebrity status ===
In 1993, Lydon's first autobiography, Rotten: No Irish, No Blacks, No Dogs, was published. Aided by Keith and Kent Zimmerman, and featuring contributions from figures including Paul Cook, Chrissie Hynde, Billy Idol and Don Letts, the work covered his life up until the collapse of the Sex Pistols. Describing the book, he stated that it "is as close to the truth as one can get, looking back on events from the inside. All the people in this book were actually there, and this book is as much their point of view as it is mine. This means contradictions and insults have not been edited, and neither have the compliments, if any. I have no time for lies or fantasy, and neither should you. Enjoy or die." In December 2005, Lydon told Q that he was working on a second autobiography to cover the PiL years.

In the mid-1990s, Lydon hosted Rotten Day, a daily syndicated US radio feature written by George Gimarc. The format of the show was a look back at events in popular music and culture occurring on the particular broadcast calendar date about which Lydon would offer cynical commentary. The series was originally developed as a radio vehicle for Gimarc's book, Punk Diary 1970–79, but after bringing Lydon on board, it was expanded to cover notable events from most of the second half of the 20th century.

In 1997, Lydon released a solo studio album on Virgin Records called Psycho's Path. He wrote all the songs and played all the instruments; for one song ("Sun"), he sang the vocals through a toilet roll. The US version included a Chemical Brothers remix of the song "Open Up" by Leftfield with vocals by Lydon, which was a club hit in the US and a big hit in the UK. Lydon has recorded a second solo studio album but it has not been released, except for one song that appeared on The Best of British £1 Notes. In November 1997, Lydon appeared on Judge Judy fighting and winning a suit filed by his former tour drummer Robert Williams for breach of contract, assault and battery.

In January 2004, Lydon appeared on the British reality television programme I'm a Celebrity...Get Me Out of Here!, which took place in Australia. He proved he still had the capability to shock by calling the show's viewers "fucking cunts" during a live broadcast. The television regulator and ITV, the channel broadcasting the show, between them received only 91 complaints about Lydon's language.

In a February 2004 interview with the Scottish Sunday Mirror, Lydon said that he and his wife "should be dead", since on 21 December 1988, thanks to delays caused by his wife's packing, they missed the Pan Am Flight 103 that was blown up over Lockerbie, Scotland.

After I'm a Celebrity ... , he presented a documentary about insects and spiders called John Lydon's Megabugs which was shown on the Discovery Channel. Radio Times described him as "more an enthusiast than an expert". He went to present two further programmes: John Lydon Goes Ape, in which he searched for gorillas in Central Africa; and John Lydon's Shark Attack, in which he swam with sharks off South Africa.

In late 2008, Lydon appeared in an advertising campaign for Country Life butter, on British television. Lydon defended the move by stating that the main reason he accepted the offer was to raise money to reform Public Image Ltd without a recording contract. The advertising campaign proved to be highly successful, with sales of the brand rising 85% in the quarter following, which many in the media attributed to Lydon's presence in the advertisement.

=== 2006–2009: Sex Pistols revivals ===
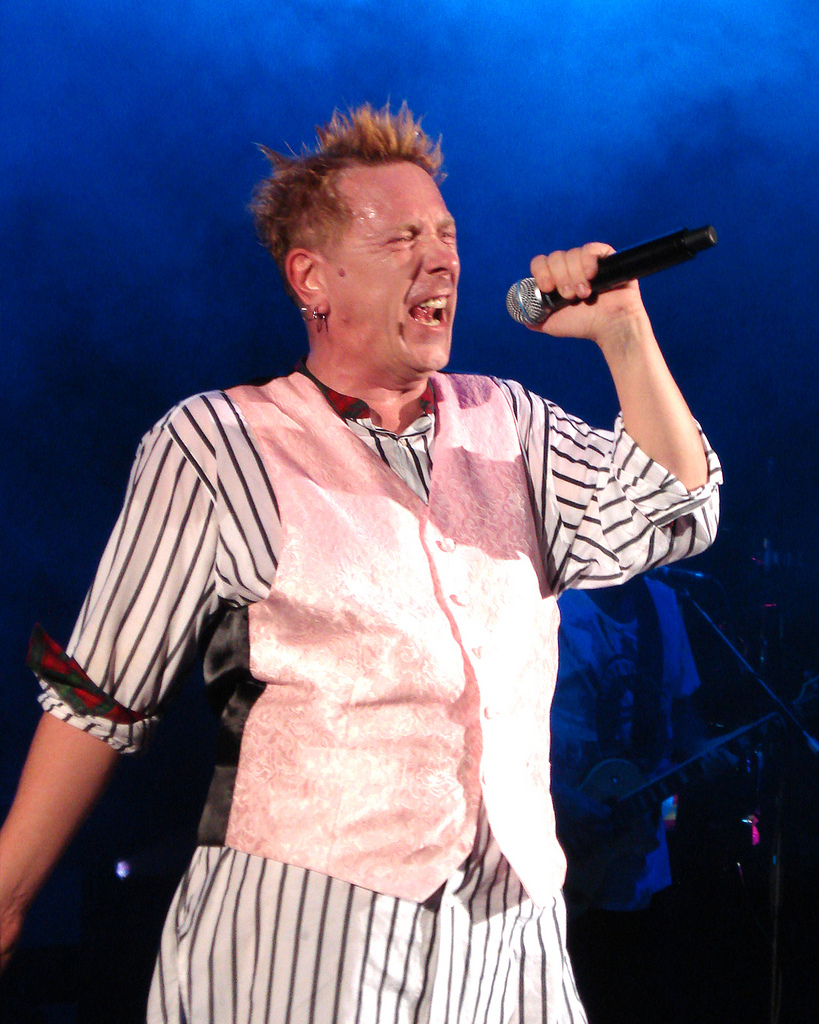
Lydon performing in 2008

Although Lydon spent years denying that the Sex Pistols would ever perform together again, the band re-united (with Matlock returning on bass) in 1996 and embarked on a successful tour that year. In 2002, the year of Queen Elizabeth's Golden Jubilee, the Sex Pistols reformed again to play the Crystal Palace National Sports Centre in London. In 2003, their 'Piss Off Tour' took them around North America for three weeks. Further performances took place in Europe from 2007 to 2008.

In 2006, the Rock and Roll Hall of Fame inducted the Sex Pistols, but the band refused to attend the ceremony or acknowledge the induction, complaining that they had been asked for large sums of money to attend.

=== 2009–present: Public Image Ltd reformation ===
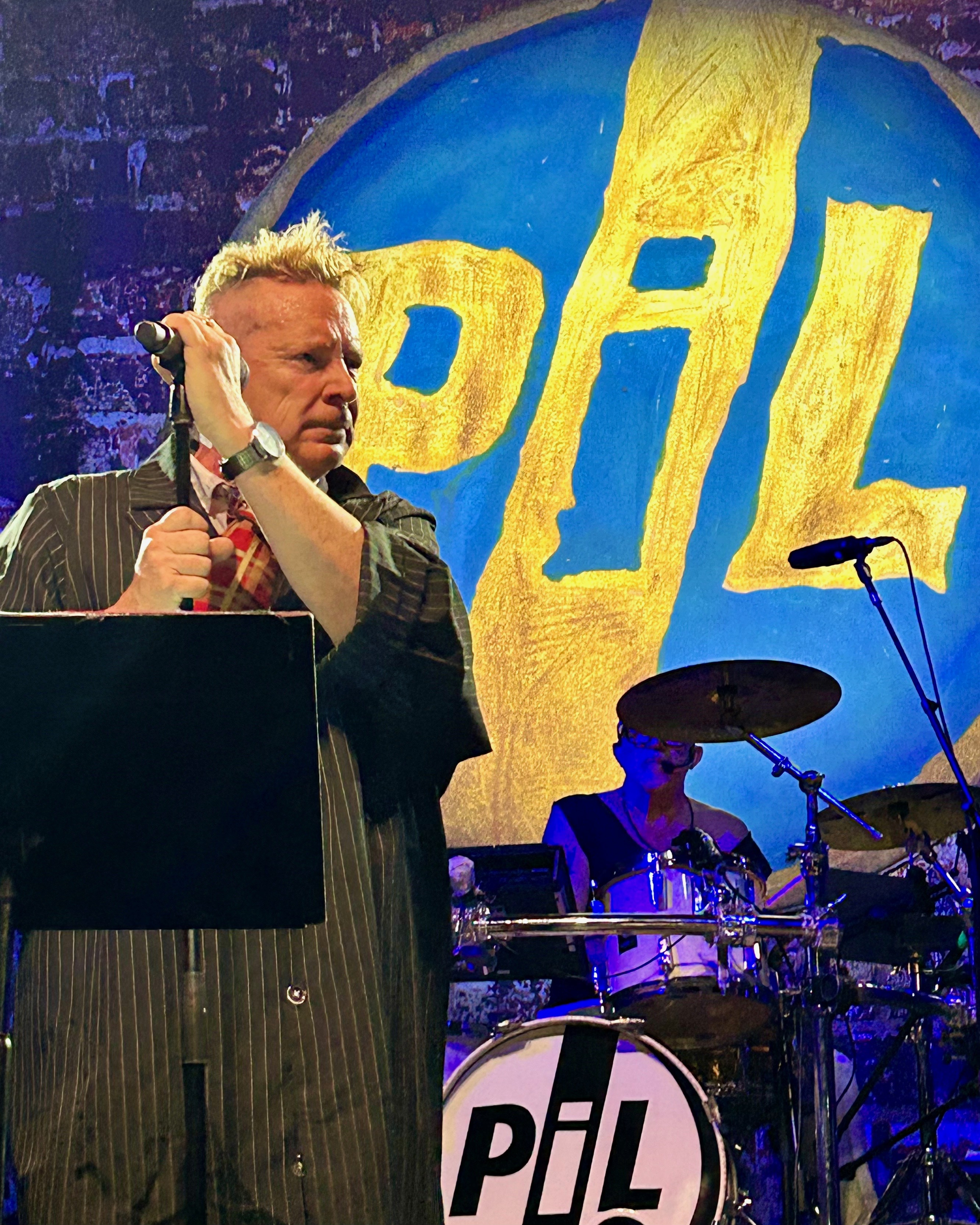
Lydon performing with PiL at the O_{2} Ritz in Manchester, 2023

In September 2009, it was announced that PiL would reform, including earlier members Bruce Smith and Lu Edmonds, for a number of Christmas concerts in the UK. Lydon financed the reunion using money he earned doing a UK television advertisements for Country Life butter. Lydon commented "The money that I earned from that has now gone completely – lock stock and barrel – into reforming PiL".

Over the years, Lydon has consistently been a staunchly committed, vocal and active supporter of the state of Israel; in August 2010, Lydon played with Public Image Ltd. in Tel Aviv, Israel despite protests. Lydon was criticised for giving a statement to The Independent newspaper, in which he said: "I really resent the presumption that I'm going there to play to right-wing Nazi Jews. If Elvis-fucking-Costello wants to pull out of a gig in Israel because he's suddenly got this compassion for Palestinians, then good on him. But I have absolutely one rule, right? Until I see an Arab country, a Muslim country, with a democracy, I won't understand how anyone can have a problem with how they're treated."

In October 2013, Lydon clarified in an interview:

(W)herever I am in the world, I love the people. We went to Israel [in 2010] and were very glad at the opportunity to play in Israel to Israelis...I support no government anywhere, ever, never. No institution, no religion – these are things that all of us as human beings do not need. When I go to a place like Israel, it's not to support anti-Arab sentiment or pro-Israeli government, it's to play to the people.

During an April 2013 tour of Australia, Lydon was involved in a television interview for The Project that resulted in a publicised controversy, as he was labelled "a flat out, sexist, misogynist pig" by one of the panellists on the Australian programme. The altercation occurred with host Carrie Bickmore, and the description was provided by panellist Andrew Rochford after the interview was prematurely terminated by Bickmore's colleague Dave Hughes. Lydon conducted the interview from Brisbane while on PiL's first tour of Australia in twenty years – first announced in December 2012 – during which concerts were held in the capital cities of Sydney and Melbourne.

Lydon was cast to play the role of King Herod for the North American arena tour of Andrew Lloyd Webber's sung-through rock opera Jesus Christ Superstar. He was to play the role starting 9 June through 17 August, and be joined by Ben Forster as Jesus, Brandon Boyd of rock band Incubus as Judas Iscariot, former Destiny's Child singer Michelle Williams as Mary Magdalene, and former NSYNC singer JC Chasez as Pontius Pilate. On 31 May 2014, the producers announced that the tour of the production was cancelled, because of poor advance ticket sales.

A compilation of Lydon's lyrics, Mr. Rotten's Songbook, was published in 2017. The limited-edition book includes the words to every song he wrote during his entire career, punctuated by his own original sketches and cartoons.

In 2021, Lydon competed in season six of the American version of The Masked Singer as the wild card contestant "Jester" which was the show's second human character after Larry the Cable Guy's wild card character "Baby". He was eliminated alongside Natasha Bedingfield as "Pepper".

In 2023, Lydon, with PiL, submitted a song to compete to represent Ireland in the annual Eurovision Song Contest. The song was entitled "Hawaii", and was a love song dedicated to his wife. The band failed to advance past the qualifying rounds of the Contest, placing 4th overall out of 6 entrants.

In 2026, Lydon appeared as a contestant on the seventh series of the British version of The Masked Singer as "Yak". He was third to be unmasked.

== Origin of stage name ==
In a 10th February 2005 interview on the BBC's The Heaven and Earth Show Lydon said of his name, "Rotten was just a showbiz (name)…it was a dig at first, but I stuck with it…John Lydon is what I sign cheques (with)"

Lydon explained the origin of his stage name, Johnny Rotten, in a feature interview with The Daily Telegraph in 2007: he was given the name in the mid-1970s, when his lack of oral hygiene led to his teeth turning green. One version says the name came from the Sex Pistols' guitarist Steve Jones, who saw Lydon's teeth and exclaimed, "You're rotten, you are!"

In 2008, Lydon had extensive dental work performed in Los Angeles, at a reported cost of US$22,000. He said that it was not done out of vanity: "It was necessity ... all those rotten teeth were seriously beginning to corrupt my system".

== Personal life ==
Lydon met Nora Forster, a publishing heiress from Germany, in 1975 and they were married from 1979 until her death in April 2023 (around 44 years). (Note: Sources are divided as to their marriage dates. While most sources give 1979, at least one gives 1977, and the 2018 documentary film The Public Image Is Rotten states Lydon and Forster were together for 10 years before formally marrying.) Forster was 14 years his senior. He was the stepfather of Forster's daughter Ariane (Ari Up), known for being the lead vocalist of the Slits. In 2000, Lydon and Nora became legal guardians of Up's twin teenage boys; as Lydon explained "[Up] let them run free. They couldn't read, write or form proper sentences. One day Ari said she couldn't cope with them anymore. I suggested they came to us because I wasn't having them abandoned. They gave us hell, but I loved having kids around." In 2010, Up died of breast cancer at the age of 48 and they became guardians of her third child. Lydon and Forster primarily lived in Venice, Los Angeles, where they had resided since the early 1980s, but kept a residence in London.

In 2018, Lydon revealed that Forster was in the mid-stages of Alzheimer's disease. In June 2020, Lydon said that he had become full-time carer for his wife as her condition has been deteriorating. "Nora has Alzheimer's... I am her full-time carer and I won't let anyone mess up with her. For me, the real person is still there. That person I love is still there every minute of every day and that is my life. It's unfortunate that she forgets things, well, don't we all? I suppose her condition is one of like a permanent hangover for her. It gets worse and worse, bits of the brain store less and less memory and then suddenly some bits completely vanish." Lydon said experts were impressed with how she remembered him saying, "A bit of love goes a long way", and that he had no intentions to put her in a care home – despite the strain her illness had on both their lives. In April 2023, Forster died as a result of complications stemming from Alzheimer's disease.

Lydon's closest male friend was his manager and personal minder, the late John "Rambo" Stevens. Having known each other since childhood and both lived in Finsbury Park, London, they were friends for more than 50 years, with Rambo having been described as "Lydon's minder, his hairdresser, his signet-ring designer, his fellow traveller, his mate."

Lydon is a visual artist. His drawings, paintings and other related works have featured prominently in the works of PiL and his solo career throughout the years.

=== Citizenship ===
Lydon became an American citizen in 2013, in addition to his British and Irish citizenships. He later spoke of how he would never have considered becoming a US citizen during the "Bush years" because of the "horrible" way America presented itself abroad, but the Obama presidency had changed his mind, in particular because "America has the potential to be a nation that actually cares for its afflicted and wounded and ill and disenfranchised" as a result of the Affordable Care Act ("Obamacare").

=== Religious views ===
Lydon's parents raised their sons as Roman Catholics. Lydon is openly critical of the Catholic Church, particularly the sexual abuse cases, and in 2010 he called for legal action against the Pope. He wrote in the liner notes of the Public Image Ltd. single "Cruel": "Where Is God? I see no evidence of God. God is probably Barry Manilow." In his 1994 autobiography, he has stated that he "never had any godlike epiphanies or thought that God had anything to do with this dismal occurrence called life."

== Political and social criticism ==
Lydon describes himself as a "pacifist by nature" and expresses admiration for Mahatma Gandhi.

Despite the fact that he wrote and sang "Anarchy in the U.K." with the Sex Pistols, Lydon said in a 2012 interview, "I never was (an anarchist). Whoever told you that? Anarchy is mind games for the middle class... I also had a song that said Pretty Vacant. I'm not pretty and I'm not vacant." In a 2022 piece in The Times, Lydon elaborated,"Anarchy is a terrible idea. Let's get that clear. I'm not an anarchist. And I'm amazed that there are websites out there – .org anarchist sites – funded fully by the corporate hand and yet ranting on about being outside the shitstorm. It's preposterous. And they're doing it in designer Dr Martens, clever little rucksacks and nicely manufactured balaclavas."

In a 2010 interview with The Quietus, Lydon also dismissed the notion that Malcolm McLaren's Situationist tactics were relevant to him, commenting, "Situationism is a ludicrous proposition. It's ill-formed and it's perfectly French. That Gallic disposition towards common sense... L'Anarchie! It all reads nicely, but it's an intellectual entertainment, really…these people are hopeless idiots."

On a 2012 Question Time appearance, Lydon said of drugs "I don't see why these things should be illegal if the correct information is out there. Here's the problem – you can kill yourself with two tablespoons of table salt. Are you now going to ban table salt?", adding "Let us as human beings determine our own journey in life."

Appearing on the BBC's Question Time on 5 July 2012, Lydon questioned the notion of a parliamentary inquiry into the banking industry, saying "How on earth is Parliament going to discuss this really when both sides, left and right, are connected to this? This doesn't just go back to Brown, this is part of the ongoing problem. Mr Diamond comes from Wall Street ... hello. Both parties love this idea. They are fiddling with rates. They are affecting the world and everything we used to count on as being dependable and accurate is being discussed by these argumentative chaps. If I nick a motor I'm going to be up before the judge, the rozzers. Hello, same thing."

Lydon criticised the paramilitary organisations involved in The Troubles in Northern Ireland, remarking that the Provisional Irish Republican Army and the Ulster Defence Association were "like two mafia gangs punching each other out ... They both run their extortion rackets and plague people to no end." He remarked that "The Northern Ireland problem is a terrible thing, and it's only the ignorance of the people living outside of it that keeps it going" but that ultimately the British government's exploitative attitude to the problem was in his opinion the main cause.

In 2025, Lydon criticised the Irish hip-hop trio Kneecap after a video emerged of them reportedly telling fans to "kill their local [Tory] MP". Speaking on Good Morning Britain, he said: "If you're advocating the death of another human being, then you have no cause whatsoever. You are my enemy from here on in for the rest of your mediocre existence." Commenting on what he saw as Kneecap's controversial approach Lydon observed, "I think they're following what they think is the Sex Pistols route…It's helpful isn't it, when you get the Financial Times propping you up", noting also that The Sex Pistols had been "celebrated" in business papers and publications.

=== American politics ===
Lydon became a citizen of the United States in 2013 because he "believed in Barack Obama" and his health care reform, on which he states, "his healthcare thing didn't quite work out what we all want, but there is a great potential there. Now we're looking at dismantling and, you know, [a] crazy loony monster party."

Before Donald Trump was elected president in 2016, Lydon said, in response to questions about his prospects: "No, I can't see it happening, it's a minority that support him at best, and it's so hateful and ignorant." In 2017, though, he said "I'm up for anyone shaking up the jaded world of politicians". During a Good Morning Britain interview in March 2017, Lydon described Trump as a "complicated fellow" who "terrifies politicians". Lydon said that there were "many, many problems with (Trump) as a human being" but defended him against accusations of racism: "What I dislike is the left-wing media in America are trying to smear the bloke as a racist and that's completely not true." He elaborated to NPR: "He's a total cat amongst the pigeons ... [He's] got everybody now involving themselves in a political way. And I've been struggling for years to get people to wake up and do that."

In 2018, Lydon was photographed wearing a shirt that read Trump's campaign slogan Make America Great Again. In October 2020, Lydon told the BBC's Newsday programme, "Yes, of course, I'm voting for Trump ... I don't want a politician running this world anymore." A month later, during an interview on Good Morning Britain, Lydon confirmed he had voted for Trump in the then-upcoming presidential election, describing Trump's Democratic opponent Joe Biden and his 2016 Democratic opponent Hillary Clinton as champagne socialists. He also described his support for Trump as stemming from his background as a working class Englishman and accused the US media of being dominated by liberal ideology, but "liberal with the truth" and said "they toe the line of the Democrat party by assumption that they know what's best, yet they don't know nothing about blue collar workers, Latinos, African-Americans in or outside of large cities."

=== Institutions of the United Kingdom ===
On the same episode of Question Time, Lydon was critical of the announcement that the British Army was to be reduced in size, saying: "One of the most beautiful things about Britain, apart from the National Health Service and the free education, is the British Army." He has been a supporter of the NHS since receiving treatment for meningitis at age 7, stating in 2014: "I want national health and education to always be of the highest agenda and I do not mind paying tax for that."

Referring to the republican sentiments expressed in the Sex Pistols song "God Save the Queen", Lydon stated in June 2022 opinion column during the Queen's Platinum Jubilee that he had softened his views on royalty and did not harbour any resentment against the royal family. He signed it off unironically with "God save the Queen". Following the death of Queen Elizabeth II, Lydon paid tribute to the Queen on Twitter and subsequently objected to any commercial use of the Sex Pistols' tracks to capitalise on the Queen's death.

=== Israel and BDS ===
Lydon opposes the Boycott, Divestment and Sanctions movement. In 2010, when Elvis Costello and Roger Waters announced their intention to cancel performances in Israel and boycott the country, Lydon elected to continue with a Public Image Ltd concert in Tel Aviv. When asked about his decision in an interview with The Independent, Lydon remarked "if Elvis-fucking-Costello wants to pull out of a gig in Israel because he's suddenly got this compassion for Palestinians, then good on him. But I have absolutely one rule, right? Until I see an Arab country, a Muslim country, with a democracy, I won't understand how anyone can have a problem with how they're treated."

Writing in the Jewish news and culture Tablet in 2018 in an article entitled "Johnny Rotten Goes Punk on Jeremy Corbyn", Israeli journalist Liel Leibovitz hailed Lydon as "a righteous dude" for his unequivocal support of Israel, commenting approvingly that Lydon "chew[s] out anyone who succumbs to the pressures of the BDS movement", going on to quote Lydon as proclaiming to a live PIL audience, "I am here to say," ( Lydon ) thunders, "people of Israel, I support you 100 percent." In the same PIL performance that Leibowitz praises, he comments approvingly that "Lydon helped redefine British punk when he took the stage and let Labour's leader, Jeremy Corbyn, know exactly what he thought of his anti-Jewish bigotry...culminating in Johnny "Rotten" shouting "I am Jew!" (sic).

=== Jimmy Savile abuse scandal ===
In a 1978 BBC Radio 1 interview, Lydon alluded to the sexual abuses committed by Jimmy Savile, and mainstream social forces' suppression of negative information about him, decades before it became a public scandal. Lydon was planning on making a film showing famous people being killed, and when the interviewer asked him who was on his list Lydon replied: "I'd like to kill Jimmy Savile; I think he's a hypocrite. I bet he's into all kinds of seediness that we all know about, but are not allowed to talk about. I know some rumours." He added: "I bet none of this will be allowed out." After the interviewer suggested libel might be an issue, Lydon replied, "Nothing I've said is libel."

As Lydon predicted, the comment was edited out by the BBC before broadcast. The complete interview was included as a bonus track on a rerelease of Public Image: First Issue in 2013, after Savile's death. In October 2014, Lydon said that "[b]y killed I meant locking him up and stopping him assaulting young children ... I'm disgusted at the media pretending they weren't aware." Lydon alleged that the BBC blacklisted him following the interview, and he remained "very, very bitter that the likes of Savile and the rest of them were allowed to continue."

=== LGBT issues ===
Lydon spoke of his admiration for poet and playwright Oscar Wilde, stating that "his stuff was fucking brilliant. What an attitude to life! ... he turned out to be the biggest poof on earth at a time when that was completely unacceptable. What a genius."

Lydon expressed his view on gay couples raising children in a 10 February 2005 interview on the BBC's Sunday morning religious programme The Heaven and Earth Show. Lydon said, "I don't like the idea of one-parent families. It's very tough on the kids. They grow up missing something. I find the same with same-sex marriages; there is something missing. There is a point to male and female – and for a child to develop, it needs both those aspects."

In a 2012 interview with The New Yorker, Lydon said, "You have every right to the freedom of religious opinion but not to the detriment of others' freedoms… If religion creeps in and takes hold like that, in this opposition to something as stupid as gay marriage, there will be real problems ahead. We must not be slaves to dogma. What century is this?… Me, as a human, I never want to take away another human being's choices or lifestyles or anything."

=== Abortion ===
In a 2017 interview with Rolling Stone, when discussing the Sex Pistols song "Bodies", Lydon said, "The song is about abortion, and yes, it is a woman's right [to choose] absolutely because she has to bear the child and all the issues thereinafter. Is it wise to bring an unwanted child into the world? No, I don't think it is, but again that is just my opinion, because I always would leave it to the woman. Always."

=== UK politics and the European Union ===
Lydon publicly supported the United Kingdom remaining in the European Union during the referendum on EU membership in June 2016. During an interview on Good Morning Britain in March 2017, Lydon stated that he had changed his mind and supported Brexit: "Well, here it goes, the working-class have spoke and I'm one of them and I'm with them." Lydon described Brexit advocate Nigel Farage as "fantastic" and that he wanted to shake his hand after his altercation on the River Thames with anti-Brexit campaigner Bob Geldof. In 2020, Lydon reiterated his personal support for Farage during another interview on Good Morning Britain.

In a 2021 interview with the Yorkshire Post, Lydon said that he previously voted for the Labour Party as a young man due to coming from a working-class background, but stated "I do not recognise them any more" and accused contemporary British and American media of "walking hand in glove with left-wing politics". Lydon has also expressed disdain for Labour Prime Minister Tony Blair and described former Labour leader Jeremy Corbyn as a "racist, prejudiced bastard" in response to the allegations of antisemitism in the Labour Party.

In 2022, during the first Conservative Party leadership election of that year, Lydon stated that he would like to see Jacob Rees-Mogg as the next U.K. prime minister. Lydon said: "I love that World War Two respect, put Britain first attitude he has", going on to say "I think he's just genuinely a nice person…he (Jacob Rees-Mogg) has civility and that makes him interesting, and it makes debate and conversation interesting."Rees-Mogg replied to Lydon's comments on Twitter, writing "Even if my leg is being pulled I am honoured by this exceptionally kind endorsement".

=== United Kingdom's class structure ===
Since his rise to public attention, Lydon has remained an outspoken critic of much in British politics and society. He comes from an immigrant working class background and is opposed to the class system, describing how private schools "tend to turn out little snobs. They're taught a sense of superiority, which is the kiss of death ... They're absolutely screwed up for life." He is critical of the upper class, stating that they "parasite off the population as their friends help them along" but he equally criticises the working class, claiming that "We're lazy, good-for-nothing bastards, absolute cop-outs [who] never accept responsibility for our own lives and that's why we'll always be downtrodden." He opposes all forms of segregation in schools, not only through the private and state school division but also with single-sex schools: "It doesn't make sense. It's a much better environment with girls in the class. You learn a lot more, as diversity makes things more interesting."

== Books ==
- Lydon, John, with Zimmerman, Keith, & Zimmerman, Kent. (1994). Rotten: No Irish, No Blacks, No Dogs. London: Hodder & Stoughton ISBN 978-0859653411
- Lydon, John. (2010). Mr. Rotten's Scrapbook. Limited print run of 750 by mail order only.
- Lydon, John, with Bolton, Andrew. (2013). Punk: Chaos to Couture Yale University Press ISBN 978-0300191851
- Lydon, John. (2014). Anger Is an Energy: My Life Uncensored. Simon & Schuster ISBN 978-1471137198
- Lydon, John. (2017). Mr. Rotten's Songbook. Limited print run of 1,000 by mail order only.
- Lydon, John. (2020). I Could Be Wrong, I Could Be Right. A Way With Media, limited print run of 10,000 by mail order only. ISBN 978-1-910469-27-9

== Discography ==
All chart positions are UK.

=== Sex Pistols ===
Studio albums

- Never Mind the Bollocks, Here's the Sex Pistols (Virgin, 1977), No. 1

Compilations and live albums

- The Great Rock 'n' Roll Swindle (Virgin, 1979)
- Some Product: Carri on Sex Pistols (Virgin, 1979)
- Flogging a Dead Horse (Virgin, 1980)
- Kiss This (Virgin, 1992)
- Never Mind the Bollocks / Spunk (aka This Is Crap) (Virgin, 1996)
- Filthy Lucre Live (Virgin, 1996)
- The Filth and the Fury (Virgin, 2000)
- Jubilee (Virgin, 2002)
- Sex Pistols Box Set (Virgin, 2002)

Singles

- "Anarchy in the UK" – 1976, No. 38
- "God Save the Queen" – 1977, No. 2
- "Pretty Vacant" – 1977, No. 6
- "Holidays in the Sun" – 1977, No. 8
- "(I'm Not Your) Stepping Stone" – 1980, No. 21
- "Anarchy in the UK" (re-issue) – 1992, No. 33
- "Pretty Vacant" (live) – 1996, No. 18
- "God Save the Queen" (re-issue) – 2002, No. 15

=== Public Image Ltd ===
Studio albums

- Public Image: First Issue (Virgin, 1978), No. 22
- Metal Box (a.k.a. Second Edition) (Virgin, 1979), #18, US No. 171
- The Flowers of Romance (Virgin, 1981), #11, US No. 114
- Commercial Zone (PiL Records, 1983)
- This Is What You Want... This Is What You Get (Virgin, 1984)
- Album (Virgin, 1986)
- Happy? (Virgin, 1987)
- 9 (Virgin, 1989)
- That What Is Not (Virgin, 1992)
- This is PiL (PiL Official, 2012)
- What the World Needs Now... (PiL Official, 2015)
- End of World (PiL Official, 2023)

Compilations and live albums

- Paris au Printemps (Virgin, 1980)
- Live in Tokyo (Virgin, 1983)
- The Greatest Hits, So Far (Virgin, 1990)
- Plastic Box (Virgin, 1999)
- The Public Image is Rotten – Songs from the Heart (Virgin, 2018)

Singles

- "Public Image" – 1978, No. 9
- "Death Disco" – 1979 No. 20
- "Memories" – 1979, No. 60
- "Flowers of Romance" – 1981, No. 24
- "This Is Not a Love Song" – 1983, No. 5
- "Bad Life" – 1984, No. 71
- "Rise" – 1986, No. 11
- "Home" – 1986, No. 75
- "Seattle" – 1987, No. 47
- "The Body" – 1987, No. 100
- "Disappointed" – 1989, No. 38
- "Don't Ask Me" – 1990, No. 22
- "Cruel" – 1992, No. 49
- "One Drop" – 2012
- "Out of the Woods"/"Reggie Song" – 2012
- "Double Trouble" – 2015
- "Hawaii" – 2023

=== Solo ===
Studio albums

- Psycho's Path (Virgin, 1997)

Compilations

- The Best of British £1 Notes (Lydon, PiL and Sex Pistols) (Virgin/EMI, 2005)

Singles

- "Sun" – 1997 – No. 42

=== With others ===
Studio albums

- The Golden Palominos – Visions of Excess ("The Animal Speaks") (Celluloid, 1985)

Singles

- Time Zone with Afrika Bambaataa – "World Destruction" (1984)
- Leftfield – "Open Up" (Hard Hands, 1993) – No. 11

== Filmography ==
=== Film ===
Year	Title	Role	Notes
1983	Copkiller	Leo Smith	
2000	The Independent	Baruce	
2012	Beware of Mr. Baker	Himself	

=== Television ===
Year	Title	Role	Notes
1997	Judge Judy	Himself	Defendant - Judge Judy ruled in his favour
2000	Rotten TV	Himself	VH1 show- aired 3 episodes
2004	I'm a Celebrity…Get Me Out of Here!	Himself	Series 3 contestant; finished in 7th place on Day 11
2018–2020	Rise of the Teenage Mutant Ninja Turtles	Meat Sweats/Rupert Swaggart (voice)	Recurring role
2021	The Masked Singer	Jester	Season 6 contestant; Eliminated in episode 8
2026	The Masked Singer	Yak	Series 7 contestant; Eliminated in episode 3
