= Bad Life (Public Image Ltd song) =

Single by Public Image Ltd

from the album This Is What You Want... This Is What You Get
- B-side: "Question Mark"
- Released: 8 May 1984
- Genre: Post-punk; alternative dance
- Length: 3:50 (7" edit); 5:15 (album version)
- Label: Virgin
- Songwriters: Martin Atkins; Keith Levene; John Lydon
- Producer: Public Image Ltd

Public Image Ltd singles chronology
"This Is Not a Love Song" (1983)	"Bad Life" (1984)	"Rise" (1986)

Music video
- "Bad Life" on YouTube

"Bad Life" is a single by the English post-punk band Public Image Ltd, released on 8 May 1984 by Virgin Records. It reached No. 71 on the UK singles chart. The song is a re-recorded version of the Commercial Zone track "Mad Max".

== Track listing ==
7" vinyl

1. "Bad Life" – 3:50
2. "Question Mark" – 4:14

12" vinyl

1. "Bad Life" – 5:15
2. "Question Mark" – 4:14

== Charts ==
Chart (1984)	Peak position
UK Singles (Official Charts)	71
