= Commercial Zone =

Studio album by Public Image Ltd
- Released: 30 January 1984
- Recorded: May 1982 – May 1983
- Studio: Park South Studios, New York, United States
- Genre: Post-punk
- Length: 32:00
- Label: PiL Records Inc.
- Producer: Public Image Ltd; Bob Miller

Commercial Zone is an album of studio recordings by Public Image Ltd, recorded in 1982 and 1983, and released in 1984 by PiL founding guitarist Keith Levene. Commercial Zone includes five songs that were later re-recorded for PiL's fourth official studio album, This Is What You Want... This Is What You Get (1984) – for this reason, Commercial Zone is often considered to be an earlier/alternative version of that album.

== Background ==
In May 1981 PiL moved from London to New York City, but in October 1981 their American record contract with Warner Brothers expired and was not renewed. In January 1982 the British music press reported that PiL had tried to record a new album in New York with producers Adam Kidron and Ken Lockie, but split instead – this was promptly denied by the band in a press release the following week.

In May 1982 Metal Box and The Flowers of Romance period drummer Martin Atkins rejoined the band and PiL started recording their new studio album for Virgin Records at Park South Studios in Manhattan, with sound engineer Bob Miller co-producing. On 29 August 1982 new bassist Pete Jones (also of Department S and Brian Brain) joined the band in the studio, the new line-up played its debut concert four weeks later (28 September 1982 in New York City). During the second half of 1982 the band planned to form their own record label (Public Enterprise Productions) and license its releases to Stiff Records USA for the American market, but these plans never materialised.

In early November 1982 PiL announced the imminent release of a new single "Blue Water" and a six-track mini album You Are Now Entering a Commercial Zone on their new label. This did not happen, with the band instead continuing to record a full-length album at Park South Studios.

By March 1983 a new track "This Is Not a Love Song" was earmarked as a new single by the band, but PiL broke up when first Pete Jones and then Keith Levene left the band. The single "This Is Not a Love Song" (with "Blue Water" as a 12" single B-side, both from the Park South sessions) was released in Japan by Nippon Columbia in June 1983. Virgin Records released it in the UK in September 1983, where it went to No. 5 in the UK single charts.

The remaining members, John Lydon and drummer Martin Atkins hired session musicians to fulfill touring commitments and carried on under the PiL name.

In mid-1983, in PiL's absence, Keith Levene took the unfinished album tapes and did his own mix. He then flew over to London and presented them to Richard Branson as the finished new PiL album for Virgin Records, but John Lydon decided to completely abandon the tapes and re-record the whole album from scratch with session musicians. This new version of Commercial Zone became This Is What You Want... This Is What You Get in 1984.

== Release ==
Levene decided to release the album himself on the American market and on 30 January 1984 registered the label PIL Records Inc. for this one-off release.

The first limited pressing of 10,000 copies for which Levene paid $8,500 out of his own pocket was self-distributed to record shops around New York City and heavily imported to the UK and European market. A second pressing (with the track listing changed around and a shorter mix of "Bad Night") followed in August 1984 in an edition of 30,000 copies, to compete directly with the official re-recorded album This Is What You Want... This Is What You Get. Virgin Records promptly took legal actions and stopped the distribution and any further re-pressings of Commercial Zone.

In 2014 Levene announced plans to revisit Commercial Zone and finally finish it. The 2014 release is called Commercial Zone 2014. In the spring of 2014, Levene went to Prague to record Commercial Zone 2014, which was backed via a crowdsourcing campaign website at Indiegogo. Tim Peacock of the Record Collector Magazine said of Levene's Commercial Zone 2014 "It's primarily instrumental in design, veering from the chilled, scene-stealing Behind the Law to the synth-heavy Kraftwerk-ian noir of They Came to dance..."

== Track by track commentary by the band ==
"Love Song"/"This Is Not a Love Song":

- John Lydon (1982/92/99): "We don't do love songs, what is the point of these unrealistic pieces of trash?” "It was all very tongue in cheek. At the time people were saying that I'd joined big business and become a bourgeois shit. So I thought the best way of tackling this would be to pump out a song saying 'That's exactly what I am!' Tongue firmly in cheek. And that kind of stopped that nonsense – so it worked". “'This Is Not A Love Song' was a sort of response to that constant request from the record company for those HITS. Someone said 'Why don't you write a love song?' Ha, I said, love song – ehh, well, this is not a love song!”
- Pete Jones (2000): "I played on some but not all of 'Commercial Zone' – 'Love Song', 'Mad Max', 'Miller High Life' and 'Solitaire'.”

"Mad Max"/"Bad Life":

- John Lydon (1984): "It was originally 'Bad Life', then it went to 'Mad Max'. There were two sets of lyrics, see, for the same song [...] That bootleg that's currently available [Commercial Zone] – and shouldn't be! – is all demo tapes, and it sounds really, really bad".
- Pete Jones (1999/2000): "Immediately after stepping off the plane from London I went straight into the studio and laid down the bass track for 'Mad Max'.” "Levene had already laid down a basspart, it was out of tune and out of time and staggered from one bum note to the next".

"Solitaire":

- Pete Jones (2000): "Atkins and I wrote 'Solitaire' but after I left they couldn't be arsed to give me a credit for it".

"The Slab"/"The Order of Death":

- John Lydon (1999): "When I went to Italy to make the film 'Order of Death' the producers asked us to do music for it. So me and Keith sort of hummed down the phone, there's me in Rome and him in New York, and we put the tune together like that. But the producers changed their minds and didn't use it".
- Bob Miller (producer, 2006): "I remember talk about soundtrack stuff. 'The Slab' was definitely one of those type of tracks, but really any of the tracks we were working on could have fit that description".

"Lou Reed Part 1 & 2"/"Where Are You?":

- John Lydon (1999): “'Where Are You?' is about departed PIL members. Say no more".
- Keith Levene (1983/2001): "I don't know what happened between [Jeannette Lee] and John when he went to Italy with her to make that movie, but she left after that". "[John Lydon had] been back from making his movie, which Jeannette had opted to go off and join him on this glamorous trip. So John came back and Jeannette was officially not in the band any more. We made this tune 'Where Are You?' and it was totally about Jeannette".
- Pete Jones (2000): "We re-recorded 'Lou Reed Part 2', but that version isn't on 'Commercial Zone'.”

"Blue Water":

- Keith Levene (1982): "A single will be released before Christmas [1982]. The album, on P.E.P. [Public Enterprise Productions], will follow".
- Pete Jones (1999/2000): "From my time with PIL it was one of my favourite tunes because of the stark darkness of it all and the interesting time signature. When there was talk of PIL doing the soundtrack to 'Order of Death' I imagined the backing for 'Blue Water' as perhaps the main theme for the film".
- John Lydon (2004): "There's a few b-sides that I think were never really heard properly, things like 'Blue Water', when we used a skip in the beat, almost a 4-4-2 step".

"Miller High Life"/"Miller Hi-Life":

- Pete Jones (2000): "Atkins and I finished recording 'Miller High Life' by ourselves with me adding three or four bass parts to the song".
- Martin Atkins (2001): "Tracks like 'Miller Hi-Life', [Keith Levene] wasn't even there! It was me, Pete Jones and Bob Miller, our sound guy, who was almost part of the band at that time. That's where 'Miller Hi-Life' came from – well, it's a beer too. We were experimenting by putting drum kits through synthesisers in 1982. That's what we did, we experimented".
- Bob Miller (producer, 2006): “'Miller Hi-Life' was a track that I did and never really had a name, and it could not be remixed because of all the things I did to it. So I guess Keith used it and called it 'Miller Hi-Life'.”

=== Related tracks ===
"This Is Not a Love Song" (single remix):

- Keith Levene (1983/2003/04): "I went to the studio to remix 'Love Song', I told them 'I've got to remix it, it's embarrassing.' Martin called John in L.A. and told him I was in the studio [...] John called up screaming that I should get out of the studio immediately, right? I said 'John, I can't put out a tune that sounds like that!'” "I did a remix of 'This Is Not A Love Song' cos they did this really awful mix. Martin was just pacing the studio all night until he could call John in L.A. John just said 'Get out of my studio!' I said 'Your studio? Fuck off and die!' When these Japanese guys came that morning to pick up the tapes, I said to Martin 'Fuck it – I'll give them both mixes and I'll let them decide.'” "When the Japanese guys arrived John got on the phone from L.A. at 5 am yelling 'Get out of my fucking studio!' And me replying 'It's not your fucking studio!' and so on". "A load of shit went wrong literally in the space of 18 hours that made it that I just said 'Fuck it!'”
- John Lydon (1984): "[The single] was never released in America so I can't talk for there, but everywhere else in the world it sold very, very well – it's the most spiteful song I've ever written! You know, this is the least thing I would have suspected of being popular!”

"The Slab" (full band version) / "Bad Night" (remixed long version) / "Bad Night" (early alternative version) / (untitled acoustic instrumental):

- Pete Jones (2000): "By the time I hit New York a lot of 'Commercial Zone' had been written [...] We recorded some other stuff that I can't remember due to the drug induced haze, that was never used. That's about it really, Keith spent hours and hours in the studio mixing and remixing stuff by himself, I was only there to play bass".
- Bob Miller (producer, 2006): "A full album I think was the goal, I believe we had about 20 reels of tape at this time [...] When we went to Japan, Keith went back to the studio unknown to us and came up with 'Commercial Zone' from all the stuff we had done before we went on the tour. Some of the final mixes were the roughs that we did before we left [...] Yes, I did expect the record to be released. I consider 'Commercial Zone' the closest to where we were going – but definitely not finished [...] I have a copy of the tracks that were first sent to Virgin Records as a guide to what we were up to (and remember Richard Branson spending some time in the studio with us), what I call the official real tracks which only were on the 'Commercial Zone' album".

== Track listing ==
Side A
No.	Title	Length
1.	"Love Song" (Re-recorded as "This Is Not a Love Song")	4:26
2.	"Mad Max" (Re-recorded as "Bad Life")	4:09
3.	"Bad Night"	3:58
4.	"Solitaire" (Titled "Young Brits" on second pressings)	3:42

Side B
No.	Title	Length
1.	"The Slab" (Re-recorded as "The Order Of Death")	3:30
2.	"Lou Reed Pt. 1"	3:58
3.	"Lou Reed Pt. 2" (Re-recorded as "Where Are You?")	2:50
4.	"Blue Water"	3:30
5.	"Miller Hi-Life"	2:35

== Personnel ==
Public Image Ltd.

- John Lydon – vocals
- Keith Levene – guitar, synthesizers (bass on "Bad Night" and "Lou Reed Part 2")
- Pete R. Jones – bass (on "Love Song", "Mad Max", "Solitaire" and "Miller Hi-Life")
- Martin Atkins – drums, percussion
- Robert E. (Bob) Miller – sound effects (on "Miller Hi-Life")

Ken Lockie was a member of PiL during the initial recording sessions, playing keyboards, but was dropped from the line-up in September 1982. His contributions, if any, were erased or not used.

== Charts ==
=== United States ===
- Commercial Zone was only released in the USA. It did not enter the Billboard 200 album charts.
- The single "This Is Not a Love Song" was not released in the USA.

=== United Kingdom ===
- The single "This Is Not a Love Song" entered the Top 75, where it stayed for 10 weeks and reached No. 5 on 17 September 1983.

=== Rest of the world ===
- In West Germany, the single "This Is Not a Love Song" entered the Top 100 on 5 December 1983, where it stayed for 16 weeks and reached #10.
- In the Netherlands, the single "This Is Not a Love Song" entered the Top 40 on 10 December 1983, where it stayed for 7 weeks and reached #12.
- In Australia, the single "This Is Not a Love Song" entered the Kent Music Report on 7 November 1983 and peaked at #17.
- In New Zealand, the single "This Is Not a Love Song" briefly entered the Top 50, where it stayed for 1 week at No. 45 on 18 December 1983.
- In France, Austria and Switzerland, the single "This Is Not a Love Song" did not chart.
