= What the World Needs Now... =

Studio album by Public Image Ltd
- Released: 4 September 2015
- Studio: Wincraft Studios, England
- Genre: Post-punk
- Length: 55:07
- Label: PiL Official Ltd

Public Image Ltd chronology
This Is PiL (2012)	What the World Needs Now... (2015)	End of World (2023)

What the World Needs Now... is the tenth studio album by British rock band Public Image Ltd. It was released on September 4, 2015.

== Reception ==
Professional ratings
Aggregate scores
Source	Rating
Metacritic	72/100
Review scores
Source	Rating
AllMusic	3.5/5 stars
Classic Rock	4/5 stars
Drowned in Sound	4/10
Mojo	4/5 stars
NME	7/10
The Observer	4/5 stars
Pitchfork	6.8/10
Q	4/5 stars
Spin	7/10
Uncut	7/10

What the World Needs Now... received mostly favourable reviews from music critics. At Metacritic, which assigns a normalised rating out of 100 to reviews from mainstream critics, the album received an average score of 72 based on 17 reviews, which indicates "generally favorable reviews".

== Track listing ==
No.	Title	Length
1.	"Double Trouble"	3:52
2.	"Know Now"	2:45
3.	"Bettie Page"	3:21
4.	"C'est la Vie"	6:08
5.	"Spice of Choice"	5:43
6.	"The One"	3:42
7.	"Big Blue Sky"	8:14
8.	"Whole Life Time"	3:46
9.	"I'm Not Satisfied"	5:43
10.	"Corporate"	5:23
11.	"Shoom"	6:30

== Personnel ==
Personnel adapted from What the World Needs Now liner notes.

Public Image Ltd.

- John Lydon – vocals, production, cover art
- Lu Edmonds – guitar, saz, piano, cümbüs, production
- Scott Firth – bass guitar, keyboards, strings, percussion, production
- Bruce Smith – drums, percussion, programming, production

Other personnel

- John "Rambo" Stevens – production, layout
- James Towler – production, engineering, mixing
- Tom Colwill – assistant engineering
- John Dent – mastering
- Tomohiro Noritsume – booklet photography

== Charts ==
Chart (2015)	Peak position
Belgian Albums (Ultratop Flanders)	192
Belgian Albums (Ultratop Wallonia)	104
Scottish Albums (OCC)	23
UK Albums (OCC)	29
UK Independent Albums (OCC)	3
