= Hugh Fleetwood =

British writee

Hugh Fleetwood (born 1944) is a British writer. He won the John Llewellyn Rhys Prize in 1974 for his second novel, The Girl Who Passed for Normal.
