= Scott Firth =

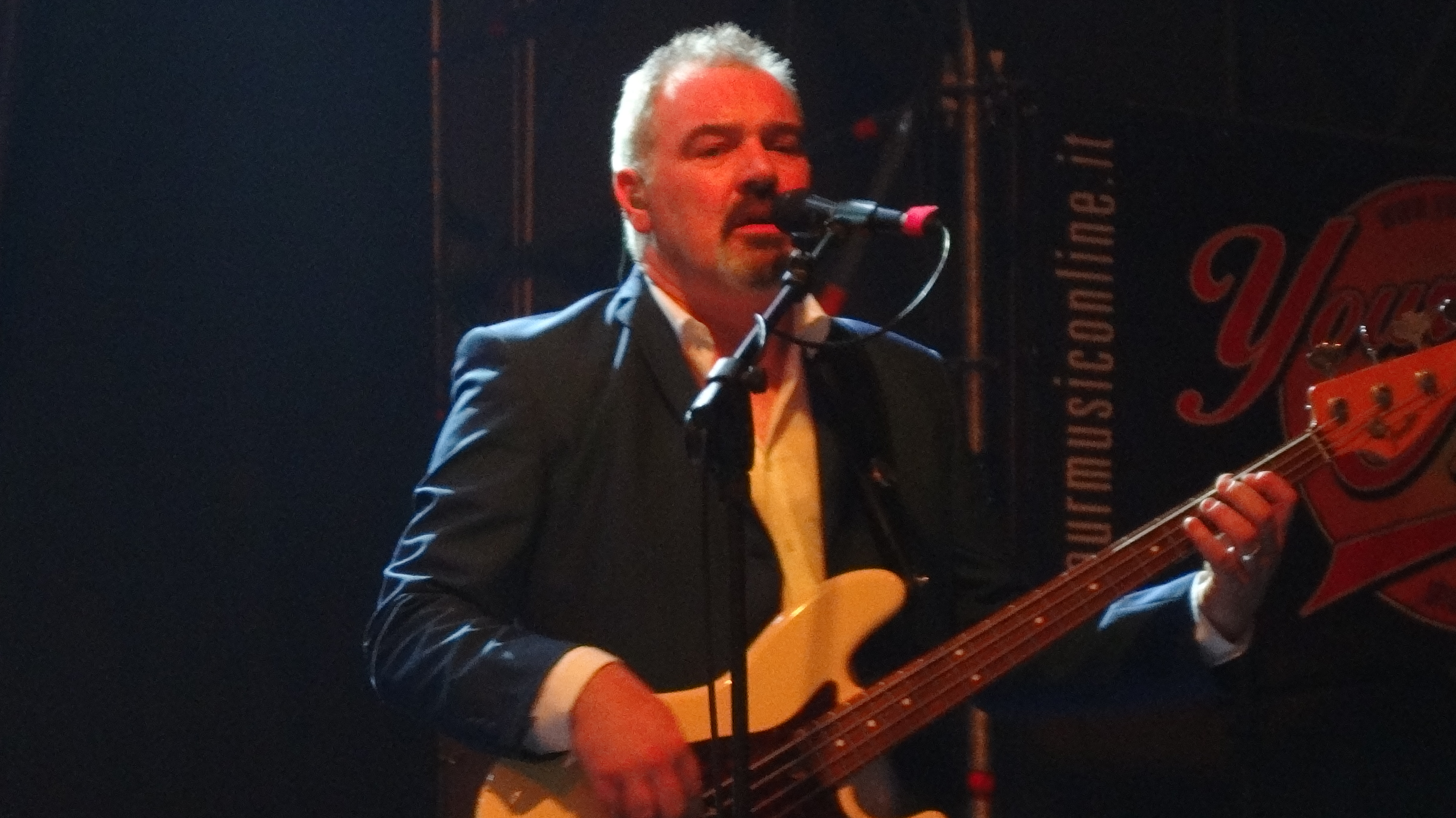

Background information
- Birth name: Scott Firth
- Born: 1 June 1963 (age 61); London, England
- Origin: Birkenhead, England
- Genres: Alternative rock, jazz, pop, pop rock
- Occupation(s): Musician, record producer
- Instrument(s): Bass, keyboards, guitar

Scott Firth (born 1 June 1963) is a British bass guitar player, guitarist and record producer.

He is the current bass player in Public Image Ltd, playing on their 2012 album, This Is PiL. and 2015 album What the World Needs Now....

== Career ==
Firth previously played with the Spice Girls on their Return of the Spice Girls Tour, as well as Melanie C, Joan Armatrading, Morcheeba, Steve Winwood, John Martyn, Little Axe, Ruby, Toni Braxton, Elvis Costello, Mari Wilson, Julia Fordham and Sarah Jane Morris. In 2017 he played live dates with Shriekback.

Firth also has his own jazz band, U-sonic, with Miles Bould. Their album Evolution earned them a MOBO nomination for the 2011 Best Jazz Act.
