= This Is Not a Love Song =

Single by Public Image Ltd

from the album This Is What You Want... This Is What You Get
- B-side: "Public Image"; "Blue Water"
- Released: 5 September 1983
- Genre: Post-punk; punk rock; dance-punk; indie rock; new wave; avant-funk; alternative dance
- Length: 3:30 (7" edit); 4:27 (12" version); 4:12 (album version)
- Label: Virgin VS 529
- Songwriters: John Lydon; Keith Levene; Martin Atkins
- Producers: Public Image Ltd; Bob Miller

Public Image Ltd singles chronology
"Flowers of Romance" (1981)	"This Is Not a Love Song" (1983)	"Bad Life" (1984)

Alternative cover
- 12" cover

"This Is Not a Love Song" is a single released by the English post-punk band Public Image Ltd in 1983. It is the band's biggest commercial hit, peaking at No. 5 on the UK singles chart and at No. 3 on the Irish Singles Chart.

The 12" remixed version of the song is featured on Commercial Zone as "Love Song". A re-recorded version of the song is featured on PiL's fourth studio album This Is What You Want... This Is What You Get and includes a horn section.

== Track listing ==
7" vinyl – A|B Virgin 105 938

1. "This Is Not a Love Song" – 3:30
2. "Public Image" – 2:58

12" maxi – Virgin 600 997

1. "This Is Not a Love Song" – 4:27
2. "Blue Water" – 3:46
3. "This Is Not a Love Song (Remixed version)" – 4:27
4. "Public Image" – 2:58

== Chart performance ==
Chart (1983–1984)	Peak position
Australia (Kent Music Report)	17
Belgium (Ultratop 50 Flanders)	20
Ireland (IRMA)	3
Netherlands (Dutch Top 40)	17
Netherlands (Single Top 100)	12
New Zealand (Recorded Music NZ)	45
UK Singles (OCC)	5
West Germany (GfK)	10
