= Rise (Public Image Ltd song) =

Single by Public Image Ltd

from the album Album
- A-side: "Rise"
- B-side: "Rise (Instrumental)"
- Released: 20 January 1986
- Studio: Power Station (New York City)
- Genre: Alternative rock
- Length: 6:05 (album version); 4:27 (7" edit)
- Label: Virgin VS 841
- Songwriters: John Lydon; Bill Laswell
- Producers: John Lydon; Bill Laswell

Public Image Ltd singles chronology
"Bad Life" (1984)	"Rise" (1986)	"Home" (1986)

Alternative cover
- 12" cover

"Rise" is a song by the English post-punk band Public Image Ltd, released as a single on 20 January 1986 by Virgin Records. It was the first single from Album, their fifth studio album. It was one of the group's biggest commercial hits, peaking at #11 on the UK Singles Chart. The song contains the phrase 'may the road rise with you', which is a direct translation of the old Irish blessing "go n-éirí an bóthar leat" (usually translated as "may the road rise up to meet you"). The phrase "anger is an energy" became the title of Lydon's 2014 autobiography.

== Background ==
The song was written by John Lydon and Bill Laswell about apartheid in South Africa, specifically about Nelson Mandela as Lydon stated in a 2013 Glastonbury interview. Lydon referred to "Rise" as "a song of rebellion" and said that it was meant to be a rebuke of violence. He also referred to alleged Royal Ulster Constabulary interrogation techniques, such as electric torture, in an MTV interview in 1987.

== Recording ==
Contributors on the song include Steve Vai and Nicky Skopelitis on guitar, Tony Williams on drums, Bill Laswell on fretless bass, L. Shankar on violin, and Ryuichi Sakamoto on a Fairlight CMI. The session was conducted at the Power Station recording studio in New York City.

Jason Cosaro served as the audio engineer for the sessions and asked Williams to record his parts at the bottom of the elevator shaft at the Power Station. The drums were miked both up close and at a distance, with a Shure SM58 placed on the snare, Sennheiser MD 421s on the toms, and Neumann U47 FETs serving as the room mics. Laswell and Skopelitis played their parts along to a rhythm track from a Fairlight CMI, with Laswell recording on a fretless bass for the purpose of achieving a more elongated sound.

Laswell was looking to evoke the sounds of drones from Indian music and Irish fiddle music, so they brought Shankar to record some violin. Lydon said that Shankar's parts provided "loads of inflections sort of buried in the background" and believed that his contributions "made 'Rise' stunning." Lydon was also accompanied on backing vocals by Bernard Fowler, who helped him achieve some of the harmonies and taught him techniques on how to sustain longer notes.

== Reception ==
In Smash Hits, Janice Long wrote, "The first single from John Lydon's lot for two years, and if this can be bettered I'll wait another two. Strong rhythm, U2-type guitar, and lyrics that will stick in your brain: it's powerful stuff."

== Personnel ==
Public Image Ltd

- John Lydon – lead vocals

with:

- Steve Vai – guitar
- Nicky Skopelitis – guitar
- Ryuichi Sakamoto – Fairlight CMI
- Bill Laswell – fretless bass
- Tony Williams – drums
- L. Shankar – violin
- Bernard Fowler – backing vocals

When it was performed on Top of the Pops (TOTP), Lydon was accompanied by Don Letts of Big Audio Dynamite (BAD), Kevin Armstrong and Hugo Burnham of Gang of Four, amongst others.

== Chart performance ==
Chart (1986)	Peak position
Belgium (Ultratop 50 Flanders)	35
Europe (Eurochart Hot 100)	42
European Airplay (Music & Media)	23
Ireland (IRMA)	10
New Zealand (Recorded Music NZ)	29
UK Singles (Official Charts)	11
