= Flowers of Romance (song) =

Single by Public Image Ltd

from the album The Flowers of Romance
- B-side: "Home Is Where the Heart Is"
- Released: 27 March 1981 (UK)
- Genre: Experimental rock; post-punk
- Length: 2:50
- Label: Virgin VS 397
- Songwriters: John Lydon and Keith Levene
- Producers: Public Image Ltd; Nick Launay

Public Image Ltd singles chronology
"Memories" (1979)	"Flowers of Romance" (1981)	"This Is Not a Love Song" (1983)

"Flowers of Romance" is a song by Public Image Ltd. It reached number twenty four on the UK Singles Chart. The 12" extended version of the song is actually two songs counted as one track: the single version of the song followed by an instrumental version of it. Keith Levene plays both the bass and the guitar on the 'b' side, Home Is Where the Heart Is.

"Listening to that again reminded me of coming out of jail [after being arrested for alleged assault in 1980]," John Lydon told Select in 1990. "That's when I recorded it. I left Dublin and went straight into the studio for two weeks solid: slept there, did everything myself, practically. No band; couldn't find Keith; more or less had to engineer the bloody thing myself cos the engineer there ran out going, 'That's impossible – you can't do that!' I did it. That particular song, I timed how long it would take me to turn the tape on, run into the studio and turn it all off. I had to rehearse that about 20 bloody times before I got it right!"

Writing in 2002, writer Garry Mulholland described the song as "the strangest chart record of the last 25 years, maybe ever."

NME ranked it the 41st best single of the year.

== Track listing ==
7" vinyl

1. "Flowers of Romance" – 2:50
2. "Home Is Where the Heart Is" – 7:33

12" vinyl

1. "Flowers of Romance (Extended Version)" – 5:40
2. "Home Is Where the Heart Is" – 7:33

== Chart performance ==
Chart (1981)	Peak position
Ireland (IRMA)	19
UK Singles (OCC)	24
