= Martin Atkins =

English musician

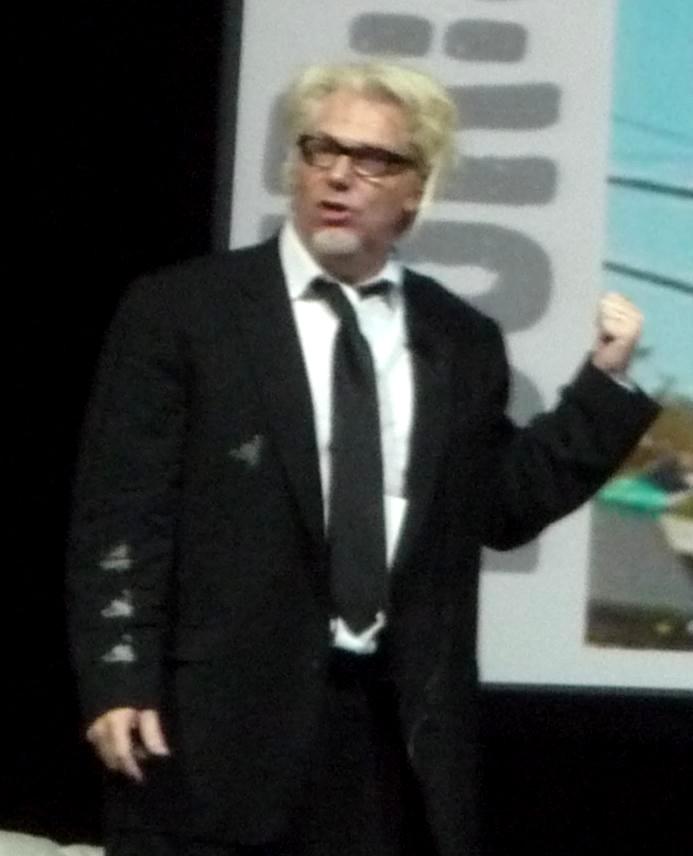
- Atkins in 2010

Background information
- Born: Martin Clive Atkins; 3 August 1959 (age 67); Coventry, England
- Genres: Avant-rock; industrial; post-punk
- Occupation: Musician
- Instrument: Drums

Martin Clive Atkins (born 3 August 1959) is an English drummer, best known for his work in post-punk and industrial groups including Public Image Ltd, Ministry, Nine Inch Nails, Pigface, and Killing Joke. He also works as a consultant, has written multiple books on the music industry, and is the music industry studies coordinator at Millikin University in Decatur, IL. Atkins is the owner and operator of the Museum of Post Punk and Industrial Music in Chicago, is an honorary board member of the Chicago-based nonprofit organization Rock For Kids, and is a fellow of In Place of War.

== Early life ==
Atkins was born in Coventry, England.

== Career ==
=== 1979–1985 ===
Atkins' first major exposure as a drummer was with John Lydon's post-Sex Pistols band, Public Image Ltd. He joined in 1979, just in time to contribute to the song "Bad Baby" on the album Metal Box. Atkins' first live show with PiL was recorded and released as a live album Paris au Printemps and his first year with the band included appearances on The John Peel Sessions for the BBC, American Bandstand and the BBC's live Old Grey Whistle Test.

In 1980, Atkins left Public Image Ltd to concentrate on his band Brian Brain with Pete Jones (who also played with Public Image Ltd in 1982 and 1983) on bass (in 1983 replaced by original Go-Go's bassist Margot Olavarria) and Bobby Surgeoner on guitar (later replaced by Olavarria's husband, Geoff Smyth). Named after the Worcestershire and Gloucestershire seam bowler Brian Brain, the band released six singles and one LP (Unexpected Noises) on Secret Records, and continued to release singles and LPs on Atkins' own Plaid Records throughout the 1980s. The band had a minor indie chart hit in 1980 with "They've Got Me in the Bottle" (#39), and club hits with the singles "Jive Jive" (1981) and "Funky Zoo" (1982).

Atkins was hired in late 1980 by Public Image Ltd to perform on The Flowers of Romance, drumming on four tracks. In 1982 he re-joined as a full-time band member, co-producing and co-writing the album This Is What You Want... This Is What You Get. Atkins left PiL for the last time in 1985.

=== 1985–2005 ===
After leaving Public Image Ltd, Atkins revived his Brian Brain project and recorded an EP at Planet Sound Studios in New York for his own, short-lived label Plaid Records, which was released in July 1985. Throughout the late 1980s, the 1990s and early 2000s, Atkins performed with many bands, including Nine Inch Nails (appearing in the video for "Head Like a Hole"), as well as Ministry. The dual-drumming of Atkins and Bill Rieflin appears on the live Ministry album/video In Case You Didn't Feel Like Showing Up. Atkins later joined Killing Joke, performing on 1990s Extremities, Dirt, and Other Repressed Emotions. He also managed the band for that time, and designed their live show scenery and some merchandise.

Atkins formed his industrial supergroup, Pigface, during a Ministry tour in 1989–1990. After joining Killing Joke for their 1990 recording, Extremities, Dirt and Various Repressed Emotions, he went on to form Murder, Inc., a new band featuring Geordie Walker and Paul Raven from Killing Joke, and Chris Connelly, in 1992. During this time, he played with the Revolting Cocks and is credited alongside Chris Vrenna in Nine Inch Nails for performing extra drums on "Wish" and "Gave Up," tracks two and six of the Broken EP (as well as the aforementioned "Head Like a Hole").

In between creating albums and touring with Pigface he also formed The Damage Manual with Jah Wobble, Walker, and Connelly. Atkins later produced and released a collaborative album with Skinny Puppy's Nivek Ogre, the latter's first project outside of Skinny Puppy, under the moniker Rx. The resulting album was entitled Bedside Toxicology.

Between 2000 and 2002 he released four albums as Opium Jukebox featuring instrumental cover tunes done in a Bhangra style.

=== 2006–present ===
In October 2006, Atkins visited Beijing to discover the emerging Chinese music scene. During his stay, Atkins recorded and signed a handful of Chinese bands to Invisible Records and recorded material for a new Pigface album.

Atkins has taught at Columbia College in Chicago where he instructed the course "The Business of Touring". He is also an active guest lecturer, speaking at such institutions as the University of Southern California, the Midi School in Beijing and Lebanon Valley College in Annville, Pennsylvania. Atkins has since become an instructor at the Madison Media Institute in Madison, Wisconsin. Atkins has announced plans to take his lecturing further by eventually opening a school of his own. He is also a former department chairman for a music business program he designed at SAE Chicago. He now is the acting Music Business program coordinator at Millikin University in Decatur, IL.

Atkins has held a number of seminars at Tech Music Schools (Drumtech, Vocaltech, Guitar-X and Keyboardtech) in London, with more planned for the future.

Atkins has written what he calls "the first real book on touring". The book Tour:Smart, featured contributions from Henry Rollins, Cynthia Plastercaster, The Enigma, the Suicide Girls, Zim Zum (formerly of Marilyn Manson), Kevin Lyman, Curse Mackey, CPA Lisa Malina and various other managers, journalists, venues, agents, sponsors, and radio personalities.

Atkins was on the tenth annual Independent Music Awards judging panel, and was also a judge for the seventh annual season of Independent Music Awards to support independent artists.

Starting in 2015, Atkins has written and performed several podcast stories for The Martin Atkins Minute, included with the NPR All Songs Considered podcast.

In 2018 Martin released Band:Smart, the follow-up to his Tour:Smart book. This book covers record labels, book agents, crafting a stage show, band names, social media and lots more.

In 2020, Martin joined the band Nadjia for a re-recording of their 90s music on the album '7 Ends 13'. A sample of Martin had actually been used in the original recording, but Martin stepped in this time to do it himself.

In 2021, Martin opened Chicago's "Museum of Post Punk and Industrial Music" documenting the history of the two movements with over 3000 items and ephemera. Displays include handwritten lyrics by Trent Reznor for Pigface, Martin's drum set, vintage rarities from Skinny Puppy, and a myriad of other rare items from the history of Industrial music.

In 2022, Martin was also inducted by Brian Eno as a fellow of In Place of War, a global organization that uses creativity in places of conflict as a tool for positive change.

== Discography ==
with Public Image Ltd

- 1979: Metal Box ("Bad Baby" only)
- 1980: Paris au Printemps (live)
- 1981: The Flowers of Romance
- 1983: Live in Tokyo (live)
- 1984: This Is What You Want... This Is What You Get

with Brian Brain

- 1987: Time Flies When You're Having Toast

with Ministry

- 1990: In Case You Didn't Feel Like Showing Up (live)

with Killing Joke

- 1990: Extremities, Dirt and Various Repressed Emotions

with Pigface

Main article: Pigface discography
- 1991: Gub
- 1992: Fook
- 1994: Notes From Thee Underground
- 1997: A New High in Low
- 2003: Easy Listening...
- 2009: 6

with Nine Inch Nails

- 1992: Broken (EP)

with Swans

- 1995: The Great Annihilator ("My Buried Child" only)

with Rx

- 1998: Bedside Toxicology

with Nadjia

- 2020: 7 Ends 13 (Select Songs)

== Bibliography ==
Further reading:

- Hämäläinen, Jyrki "Spider" (2020). Killing Joke: Are You Receiving?. Milton Keynes: New Haven Publishing Ltd. ISBN 978-1-912587-40-7.
