= The Flowers of Romance (album) =

Studio album by Public Image Ltd
- Released: 10 April 1981
- Recorded: October – December 1980
- Studios: The Manor (Shipton-on-Cherwell, England); Townhouse (London)
- Genres: Experimental rock; post-punk
- Length: 33:18
- Labels: Virgin; Warner Bros.
- Producers: Public Image Ltd; Nick Launay

Public Image Ltd chronology
Paris au Printemps (1980)	The Flowers of Romance (1981)	Live in Tokyo (1983)

Singles from The Flowers of Romance
- 1. "Flowers of Romance" Released: 27 March 1981

The Flowers of Romance is the third studio album by the English post-punk band Public Image Ltd, released on 10 April 1981 by Virgin Records. The album was recorded at The Manor Studio and Townhouse Studios over the course of two months in late 1980.

The group's first studio album recorded following the departure of bassist Jah Wobble, The Flowers of Romance found PiL delving further into an experimental sound. It was recorded mainly by frontman John Lydon and guitarist Keith Levene, both of whom made heavy use of percussion, tape editing, and various effects.

While the album has maintained a lower critical profile than their previous two albums, the album has still received acclaim and has been cited as an influence by various bands and musicians.

== Recording ==
Recording began at The Manor Studio in Shipton-on-Cherwell, Oxfordshire, with two weeks booked in early October 1980. Only one album track was recorded towards the end of these sessions ("Hymie's Him"). The band also recorded joke versions of "Twist and Shout" and "Johnny Remember Me" which remain unreleased. Drummer Martin Atkins, who visited the band towards the end of these sessions, possibly recorded the drums to "Home Is Where the Heart Is" during his visit, which would become the B-side of the "Flowers of Romance" single the following year. "Home Is Where the Heart Is" was mixed at Townhouse Studios in Shepherd's Bush; during this mixing session, producer Steve Lillywhite was dropped and replaced by Nick Launay for the album sessions.

The rest of the album was recorded at Townhouse Studios, with two weeks booked in late October and early November. Drummer Martin Atkins was hired for the sessions and contributed to the songwriting, but left on 31 October 1980 to play a gig in New York City with his band Brian Brain the following day. The songs "Vampire" and "Woodnymphs" were recorded at Townhouse but not released.

A final session at Townhouse occurred in early December 1980 to remix the proposed single "Flowers of Romance" and record a few overdubs.

== Composition ==
The album is largely centred on percussion, and Levene has described it as "probably [...] the least commercial record ever delivered to a [record] company." Similarly, the Trouser Press Record Guide states that "the music is so severe as to lend credence to a record executive's statement that The Flowers of Romance is one of the most uncommercial records ever made – at least within a 'pop' context." Simon Reynolds has described the album as highly experimental and preoccupied with moving beyond the defining standards of rock music, making it an influence on the post-rock movement. Occasional drummer Martin Atkins played on four songs, while Levene and Lydon handled percussion duties elsewhere. "Under the House", features both Levene and Atkins double drumming. The prominent, and heavily processed, drum sound was influenced by Peter Gabriel's third album, on which engineer Hugh Padgham had processed Phil Collins' drums. Collins, in turn, was so impressed with the sound on The Flowers of Romance that he hired the album's engineer, Nick Launay, to reproduce the sound for his own projects. PiL bassist Jah Wobble had left the group before The Flowers of Romance was recorded, and so Levene played bass on "Track 8" and "Banging the Door", the only two tracks on the album to feature the instrument. Lydon contributed Stroh violin and saxophone and, according to a Rolling Stone article about the album, simply banged on anything handy for percussion, including the face of a banjo on "Phenagen".

Throughout the album, musique concrète sounds, such as amplified wristwatches, reversed piano and televised opera, weave in and out of the mix. Producer Nick Launay recalls: "On 'Four Enclosed Walls', for instance, we placed Martin's Mickey Mouse pocket watch on a floor tom, so it would resonate and have more tone. Then I added two harmonizers with a fifteen-second delay fed back on themselves, one panned left, one right. I recorded about seven minutes of it ticking away." "We also had an AMS digital sampler, one of the first digital devices ever available. One day Martin played a drum groove and I pushed 'Loop Lock' and tried to make a perfect loop. The AMS was so primitive you couldn't actually edit it to get it in time, so I randomly kept locking in different beats as he played them, till I got one that sounded cool. That loop became the song 'Track 8'. It's actually out of time, but somehow it grooves."

Regarding the track "Phenagen", Lydon notes: "It's not Moroccan, it's Renaissance, early English and French, 15th century. That's what I've been listening to a lot, that's real traditional English music." Keith Levene recounts: "There's a bit of backwards guitar [...] [There also is] a banjo with three strings missing, and he [Lydon] was hitting it with something that was hanging off the banjo 'cos [sic] it made that noise [...] that was used on 'Phenagen' [...] He was annoying me all the time making that noise, then he laid down a track making that noise, then the next thing I know is this fucking great track called 'Phenagen'. It's horrible really, but it's really good the way it comes out."

Regarding "Flowers of Romance", Lydon comments: "The romance referred to is not being romantic, but alludes to people romanticising over past events with their memories [...] What I'm on about is that I wanted to move on and carry on with trying to create new things." Levene recounts that Lydon "bowed the bass" on the track. Atkins drums on the track.

On "Under the House", Lydon claims: "I wrote that after I saw a ghost, it was at The Manor". "I'd seen a few things I didn't like. I ended up sleeping in the coal shed, I couldn't bear it in the house any longer. When a place is haunted there's an intensity which is insufferable." Launay recounts: "Again, Martin laid down the beat, then we overdubbed the toms and doubled them with harmonizers, a trick used a few times on this record. Having grown up in the south of Spain I was really influenced by Spanish Gypsy music, Flamenco, and I don't mean the tacky touristy type. I kept hearing that kind of clapping, so after explaining what I meant, we did it and added a simple delay to get that effect of two clappers playing off each other. The operatic wailing in the background is exactly that – there was an opera on TV while we were playing the song back in the control room. I thought the combination sounded so cool, I put a mic on to the TV speaker and recorded it to tape randomly till it made some sense. Once the track had some kind of shape, John went out and sang on it."

Regarding "Hymie's Him", Levene recounts: "There was this weird bamboo instrument that I used on 'Hymie's Him' – Richard Branson had gotten some in Bali and gave me one of these things [...] I had been offered to make this film soundtrack for Wolfen. [Director] Michael Wadleigh [...] said, 'This is how wolves feed in the dark, this is the plot of the movie – what I need is an urban jungle sound.' So I came up with 'Hymie's Him' as my pilot for the score for the movie [...] I had it in the bag and Wadleigh loved it. I really wish I'd done the movie." "We were booked into The Manor for ten days, and it was like we knew we were doing a new album and we didn't do anything for days – we couldn't do anything. It was like this horrible mental block. After wasting seven days of being waited on hand and foot, just being real lazy cunts... we were really trying but nothing was happening. It was something to do with The Manor as well. We did get one track down – 'Hymie's Him' – that was the first definite solid thing we got laid down [...] I think we could do a service to a film. Like with this Michael Wadleigh thing, we wanted to go right down to a bottle banging on the table – the whole lot, not just the music but sounds. But then Tom Waits and other people came into it, and it wasn't what we had in mind."

Lydon recounts: "[Michael Wadleigh] offered us the chance to do a soundtrack. I mean, who wouldn't want an opportunity like that? [...] The clips we saw were really excellent [...] Originally Wadleigh wanted us to write music to suit the atmosphere, it's about wolves and killing people, and that suited us fine of course." "I thought what Keith did with the music was so good there was no point in me singing over it. Leave it alone, I said. All I could do was insult Keith with the title."

According to Lydon, "Banging the Door" "came about as a rant against the fans who found out my address in London and used to come around every night, banging away on the door and shouting 'Johnny! Johnny!' through the letter box. Nearly drove me mad!" In a 1980 interview with The Face, he comments: "It's much, much worse than it was in the days of the Sex Pistols. I've even had them pitching their tents on my front doorstep [...] I just don't let any of them in anymore. I just don't answer the door." Keith Levene: "Martin played the drums and I played the bass. Then I added synth to that." Nick Launay: "Keith was very into these synthesizer boxes that plugged into each other with little red cables, I think it was made by Roland. It was a bit like the giant Moog synth that Kraftwerk used, only in miniature. You can hear it on 'Banging the Door', it sounds like an evil giant frog!"

Regarding "Go Back", Lydon commented in the NME in 1981: "London's getting very, very fascist and I don't like it at all! 'Go Back' was written about that, about London and tedium and right-wing groups. It's pathetic, people wallow in misery and accept anything – 'Have a cup of tea, good days ahead." "That's just the way things are going in this country. You can't afford to pretend it's not happening." Keith Levene: "I only use guitar on one track called 'Go Back', and it's a great little guitarline, it's turned out to be a funky track actually." He also played drums on the track. Regarding "Francis Massacre", Lydon commented: "For me the song just sums up the way I felt when I was in [Mountjoy Prison] – grating noises, 'Aaargh, let me out!'"

== Packaging ==
The title of the album makes reference to The Flowers of Romance, an early punk band featuring both Keith Levene and Lydon's former bandmate Sid Vicious. "The Flowers of Romance" was also the title of an early Sex Pistols song. The cover photograph is of the band's videographer, Jeannette Lee.

== Release ==
The Flowers of Romance was released on 10 April 1981 by record label Virgin. Andy Kellman of AllMusic wrote of the album's release: "Stark and minimal are taken to daring lengths, so it's no surprise that Virgin initially balked at issuing the heavily percussive record."

"Flowers of Romance", was released as the album's sole single in March 1981, reaching number 24 in the UK Singles Chart. This featured a different mix from the album version. According to producer Launay, he went back to the studio "a month later with Keith and John to remix the song [...] for single release, which is a much better mix." The 12-inch version of the single included an instrumental version of the lead track and "Home Is Where the Heart Is", originally played on the Metal Box tour, an out-take recorded prior to bassist Jah Wobble’s departure from PIL.

== Reception ==
Professional ratings
Review scores
Source	Rating
AllMusic	3.5/5 stars
Christgau's Record Guide	C+
Clash	7/10
Pitchfork	9.3/10
Record Mirror	4/5 stars
Rolling Stone	4/5 stars
The Rolling Stone Album Guide	2/5 stars
Smash Hits	8/10
Spin Alternative Record Guide	6/10
Uncut	3/5 stars

Record Mirror critic Mike Nicholls praised The Flowers of Romance as a work of "worthwhile experimentalism from the forefront of the anti-rockist avant-garde". Steve Taylor of Smash Hits commented that the album implores listeners "to abandon all expectations of hearing something that even resembles the last PiL record", concluding: "Enjoyable is hardly the right word. More like provocative." NME named it the 15th best album of 1981.

Reviewing the album in 2003, Chris Smith of Stylus Magazine described The Flowers of Romance as "a dark, spartan affair, one that is decidedly not for all tastes [...] But, twenty-two years later, there's nothing quite like it. It may not offer the kinetic glamour of Remain in Light or the gleeful spazziness of the Contortions, but I believe this to be one of the most interesting records produced in the fallout of punk."

The album was one of Kurt Cobain's favourites, and was included at number 42 on a handwritten list of his 50 favorite albums of all time. In an interview with Spin in 1993, he commented that the music on it is "totally uncompromising... but it works somehow". Melvins drummer Dale Crover has cited Flowers of Romance as an influence on the band and on himself as a solo artist, noting in particular PiL's use of drum loops as influential.

Aaron Hemphill of Liars wrote an article on the album for The Guardian in 2008, calling it "a forgotten classic" and an influence on Liars' music.

== Track listing ==
All tracks are written by John Lydon and Keith Levene except where noted.

Side A
No.	Title	Writer(s)	Length
1.	"Four Enclosed Walls"	Lydon, Levene, Martin Atkins	4:44
2.	"Track 8"		3:15
3.	"Phenagen"		2:40
4.	"Flowers of Romance"		2:51
5.	"Under the House"	Lydon, Levene, Atkins	4:33

Side B
No.	Title	Writer(s)	Length
1.	"Hymie's Him"		3:18
2.	"Banging the Door"	Lydon, Levene, Atkins	4:49
3.	"Go Back"		3:46
4.	"Francis Massacre"		3:31

Reissue bonus tracks
No.	Title	Length
1.	"Flowers of Romance" (Instrumental - taken from the "Flowers of Romance" 12" single)	2:51
2.	"Home Is Where the Heart Is" (taken from the "Flowers of Romance" single)	7:34
3.	"Another" (taken from the "Memories" single)	3:51

== Personnel ==
Public Image Ltd

- John Lydon – vocals, Stroh violin, saxophone, percussion
- Keith Levene – electric guitar, bass guitar, piano, cello, synthesiser, percussion, drums (5, 8)
- Martin Atkins – drums (1, 4, 5, 7), synthesiser (7)
- Jah Wobble – bass on reissue bonus tracks "Home Is Where the Heart Is" and "Another"

Technical

- Nick Launay – production, engineering

== Charts ==
Chart (1981)	Peak position
Australian Albums (Kent Music Report)	94
New Zealand Albums (RMNZ)	33
UK Albums (Official Charts)	11
US Billboard 200	114
