= Bravig Imbs =

American writer

Bravig Imbs was an American novelist and poet as well as a broadcaster and newspaperman.

== Biography ==
Bravig Imbs was born in 1904 in Milwaukee to Norwegian-American parents. A graduate of Dartmouth College, he worked as a newspaper reporter, and music critic and, according to some, a proofreader for the International Edition of the Chicago Tribune in Paris.

In Paris he befriended George Antheil, Pavel Tchelitchew, René Crevel, Georges Maratier, and later Gertrude Stein and Alice B. Toklas. In 1931, his wife Valeska gave birth to a child, Jane Maria Louise, and Gertrude Stein ended their friendship because of her aversion to childbirth.

He wrote novels, poems and a memoir, and played the harpsichord. He translated some poems by Georges Hugnet. He also co-wrote books with Bernard Fay and André Breton. He chronicled his life in Paris in the 1920s in his Confessions of Another Young Man, published in 1936.

In 1944, he worked as a radio announcer, under the pseudonym of 'Monsieur Bobby'. He worked for the US State Department as a radio announcer for the O.I.C. in France after the war. He died there in a jeep accident travelling on official business near Livron-sur-Drome, on May 29, 1946, and was interred in a US military cemetery in Draguignan, France.

== Bibliography ==
- The Professor's Wife
- Eden—Exit this Way, and Other Poems (1926)
- Bernard Faÿ's Franklin: The Apostle of Modern Times (co-written with Bernard Fay; 1929)
- Confessions of Another Young Man (1936)
- Yves Tanguy (co-written with André Breton; 1946)
- The Wind was There (This poem by Bravig Imbs has been set to music for high voice and orchestra by composer Michael B. Matthews [1982]; and has also been set to music by Mark Winges as "Image and Motion: A Choral Symphony" [2001])
