= Ida: A Novel =

1941 novel by Gertrude Stein

Ida A Novel
- First edition
- Author: Gertrude Stein
- Publisher: Random House
- Publication date: 15 February 1941
- Pages: 154
- Preceded by: Paris France (1940)
- Followed by: Wars I Have Seen (1945)

Ida A Novel is a novel by Gertrude Stein, first published in 1941.

== Synopsis ==
Following Ida from her birth into adulthood, the narrative describes her relationships with dogs, encounters with strangers, and her multiple marriages, probably five. (Many details of her life are left unstated.) The novel is structured in two halves, the first in six parts, and the second in eight parts. She moves around the United States, and in the latter part of the novel she may be living in Europe. As a young woman Ida becomes well known and therefore must constantly negotiate people's perceptions of her; her common response is to escape. When people try to find her she is often elsewhere.

== Themes ==
=== Publicity saints ===
Stein said that the novel was "about publicity saints. The idea of the book is that religion has been replaced by publicity. A 'publicity saint' [...] is a saint with a certain mystical something about him which keeps him a saint; he does nothing and says nothing, and nobody is affected by him in any way whatsoever." With the phrase "publicity saint" Stein was thinking about people who, because the media follow them obsessively, become famous for being famous. Their lives as famous people interest us more than what they might actually do. Among the models Stein used was the Duchess of Windsor.

=== Gender identity ===
The narrator of Ida depicts a woman with a divided self: a part of her seems under the control of others, men especially, but there is another part that resists. We can never really be sure we know who Ida is. Stein's friend W. G. Rogers noted that "there is a definite one-sex-against-the-other conflict in it, that hasn't been in your books ever before."

== History of composition ==
Stein began writing Ida in May 1937, shortly after finishing her second autobiography, Everybody's Autobiography. Through the rest of 1937 she tried, unsuccessfully, to interest Thornton Wilder, a close friend at the time, in a collaboration on the novel. Stein worked on the first half of the novel until early 1940, rewriting it twice, and wrote the second half in April–May 1940. The manuscripts are in the Beinecke Rare Book and Manuscript Library. While working on Ida Stein also wrote Picasso (1937), Doctor Faustus Lights the Lights (1938), The World Is Round (1938), and Paris France (1939).

== Bibliography ==
=== Publication history ===
- Ida A Novel. New York: Random House, 1941. (Reprinted as a Vintage paperback in 1972.)
- In Look at Me Now and Here I am: Writings and Lectures 1909–1945. Ed. Patricia Meyerowitz. London: Peter Owen, 1967. 338–423.
- In Gertrude Stein: Writings 1932–1946. Ed. Catharine Stimpson and Harriet Chessman. New York: Library of America, 1998. 611–704.
- Ida A Novel. Ed. Logan Esdale. New Haven: Yale University Press, 2012.

=== Translations ===
- Ida Um Romance (Brazilian Portuguese). Translated by Luís Fernando Protásio. With texts by Badi Assad and Luiz Päetow. PONTOEDITA, 2019.
- Ида (Russian). Translated by Ilya Bass. Kolonna, 2016.
- Ida (Swedish). Translated by Johanna Mo. Foreword by Ida Börjel. Modernista, 2018.
- Ida (French). Translated by Daniel Mauroc. Points, 1997.
- Ida : Roman (Norwegian). Samlaget, 1995.
- Ida (Spanish). Alfabia, 1988.
- Ida (Finnish). Gummerus, 1988.
- Ida : ein Roman (German). Translated by Marie-Anne Stiebel. Suhrkamp, 1987.
- Ida (European Portuguese). Translated by Ricardo Alberti. Ulisseia, 1979.
- Ida (Persian). Translated by Fahimeh Zahedi. 1971.
- Ida (Italian). With illustrations by Luigi Broggini. Mondadori, 1948.

=== Criticism ===
- Berry, Ellen. "Postmodern Melodrama and Simulational Aesthetics in Ida". Curved Thought and Textual Wandering: Gertrude Stein's Postmodernism. Ann Arbor: University of Michigan Press, 1992. 153–177.
- bpNichol. "When the Time Came". Gertrude Stein and the Making of Literature. Ed. Shirley Neuman and Ira B. Nadel. Boston: Northeastern University Press, 1988. 194–209.
- Bridgman, Richard. Gertrude Stein in Pieces. New York: Oxford University Press, 1970. 306–310.
- Chessman, Harriet. "Ida and Twins". The Public Is Invited to Dance: Representation, the Body, and Dialogue in Gertrude Stein. Stanford: Stanford University Press, 1989. 167–198.
- Esdale, Logan (December 2011). "Gertrude Stein's twin". Textual Practice. 25 (6): 989–1014. doi:10.1080/0950236x.2011.618461. S2CID 161058158.
- Schmitz, Neil. Of Huck and Alice: Humorous Writing in American Literature. Minneapolis: University of Minnesota Press, 1983. 226–239.
- Secor, Cynthia (Spring 1978). "Ida, a Great American Novel". Twentieth Century Literature. 24 (1): 96–107. doi:10.2307/441068. JSTOR 441068.
- Sontag, Susan. "Performance Art". PEN America 3 (2004): 92–96.
- Watson, Dana Cairns. "Talking Boundaries into Thresholds in Ida". Gertrude Stein and the Essence of What Happens. Nashville: Vanderbilt University Press, 2005. 119–148.
