= Mark Tompkins (dancer) =

French artist & dancer

- Born: Mark Lewis Tompkins; 1954 (age 71–72); Midland, Michigan, United States
- Other name: Mark Lewis
- Occupations: Dancer, choreographer, teacher, theatre director
- Partner: Jean-Louis Badet 1985-
- Honours: SACD

Mark Lewis Tompkins (born 1954) is an American artist, dancer and choreographer of contemporary dance.

== Biography ==
Trained as an actor, Tompkins moved to France in 1973. He discovered dance with Harry Sheppard, Hideyuki Yano, Elsa Wolliaston and Lila Greene, and made his first solos. In 1978 he met Steve Paxton and Lisa Nelson and practiced and performed Contact Improvisation.

In 1983 he founded the company IDA (International Dreems Associated) and won the Bagnolet contest the following year. Active in the French contemporary dance scene in the eighties, he received the SACD (Society of Dramatic Authors and Composers) choreography prize in 2008 for his work.

== Choreography ==
Mark Tompkins' interest in improvisation and real-time composition leads him to collaborate through teaching and performing with many dancers, musicians, light designers and video makers. Over the years, his way of fabricating unidentified performance objects has become his signature. Tompkins' performances evolve towards musical theater, inspired by popular forms like music hall, cabaret and musical comedy.

Some of Mark Tompkins's performances:

- 1976: Naked Traces
- 1978: Each One's Own
- 1981: Sweet Dreems avec Lila Greene
- 1983: Empty Holes
- 1985–87: Trahisons Tripytique - Betrayals
- 1988: Nouvelles - Avignon Festival, based on the novel IDA by Gertrude Stein
- 1888–92: La Plaque Tournante
- 1989: La Valse de Vaslav, Hommage à Vaslav Nijinski
- 1992: Witness, Hommage à Harry Sheppard
- 1994: Home - le meilleur des mondes
- 1996: Gravity
- 1996: Under My Skin, Hommage à Josephine Baker
- 1988: Icons, Hommage à Valeska Gert
- 2000: remiXamor
- 2005: Animal Male
- 2007: Animal Female
- 2010: Black'n'Blues
- 2012: Opening Night
- 2013: Showtime
- 2014: Le Printemps
- 2014: Veter Norosti, A Wind of Madness, Mladisho Théâtre, Ljubljana, Slovenia
- 2016: Bambi (un drame familial)
- 2018: Stayin' Alive
- 2021: Celebration
