= Mark Tompkins =

Mark Tompkins may refer to:

- Mark Tompkins (racehorse trainer), British racehorse trainer
- Mark Tompkins (dancer) (born 1954), American-born French artist, dancer and choreographer
