= If I Told Him: A Completed Portrait of Picasso =

Poem by Gertrude Stein

"If I Told Him: A Completed Portrait of Picasso" is a poem written by Gertrude Stein in 1923. It was first published in Vanity Fair in 1924 and she subsequently published it in her 1934 collection Portraits and Prayers. This poem was part of a multi-decade intertextual dialogue between Stein and Pablo Picasso. Stein was one of the first to exhibit Picasso’s paintings at her weekly salons at 27 rue de Fleurus. In 1906, Picasso completed a portrait of Stein, and the following year, she wrote her first literary portrait of Picasso, titled “Picasso.” Over a decade later, when the two were no longer working as closely together, she wrote this second portrait, notable for its non-representational style.

Stein sitting in front of paintings at 27 rue de Fleurus, including Picasso's painting of her.
