= Elsa Wolliaston =

Elsa Wolliaston (June 28, 1945 – March 12, 2026) was a Jamaican-born dancer and choreographer.

Wolliaston had a lengthy career in the United States and in France, where she resided beginning in 1969. A major figure in the European contemporary dance scene that developed in the 1970s, she became known for her performances with the American Center in Paris, where she taught and choreographed her first pieces. With the Japanese choreographer Hideyuki Yano, she founded the dance company Mâ Danse Rituel Théâtre in 1975. In 1984, she began a lengthy collaboration with the percussionist Jean-Yves Colson. The following year, she founded the company and studio One Step, which became the base for her teaching and choreography.

== Early life and education ==
Elsa Wolliaston was born in 1945 in Jamaica, to a Kenyan father and a Colombian-born Panamanian mother. She was raised by her grandmother in East Africa, in what is now Kenya, where she was introduced to ancestral rituals at a young age. At age 15, after the death of her grandmother, she reunited with her mother in New York. There, she studied classical dance with Alexandra Danilova between 1964 and 1968, as well as contemporary technique at the Merce Cunningham Studio between 1964 and 1972. She also studied dance and piano at the Carnegie School with Franck Wagner and Nadia Boulanger, and worked with the dancer Katherine Dunham.

== Career ==
Beginning in 1969, Wolliaston relocated to Paris, where she studied with Jerome Andrews and Lilian Arlen. She gained recognition for her performances at the American Center in Paris, where she also taught. It was there that she made the connections that formed the basis for her career, including with the avant-garde jazz musicians Steve Lacy and Philly Joe Jones. She began to organize "Les soirées africaines," for which she brought in dancers and other artists from across Africa.

On numerous trips to Africa, Wolliaston researched ancestral dance and performed with the group Free Dance Song. Her work took her across West Africa, including to Niger, where in 1974 she performed the piece Le Fleuve with Christiane de Rougemont and the Japanese choreographer Hideyuki Yano.

In 1975, in partnership with Yano, Wolliaston founded the research group Mâ Danse Rituel Théâtre in Paris. The two artists collaborated over the course of 15 years on both scholarship and choreography, including the duets Rivière-Sumida / Folie (1975) and Ishtar et Tammuz, duo d'amour (1986). After Yano's death in 1988, Wolliaston dedicated the piece La Solitude d'être to him. The pair drew in various dancers and actors who shared their interest in multicultural expression that straddled the boundaries of dance and theater, including Mark Tompkins, Karine Saporta, and François Verret.

Wolliaston founded her company One Step One Step La Marche in 1985, which was the hub for her teaching and performance until 2025.

She also worked in close partnership with musicians, notably saxophonist Steve Lacy, pianist Jean-Marie Machado, and double bassist Joëlle Léandre. In 1984, she began a long-term collaboration with the percussionists Bruno Besnaïnou and Jean-Yves Colson. Her dance collaborations included Futurities (1984) with Douglas Dunn. She worked frequently on opera choreography, including for Yoshi Oida, Philippe Adrien, Peter Stein, Luc Bondy, and Patrice Chéreau.

In her work, Wolliaston sought to break away from a folkloric perception of African dance. While retaining ties to her own cultural roots, she employed a dance style blending African and contemporary expression.

== Death ==
Elsa Wolliaston died of cancer in 2026 at age 80, in Paris.
