= Tender Buttons (book) =

1914 prose poetry book by Gertrude Stein

Tender Buttons is a 1914 book by the American writer Gertrude Stein consisting of three sections titled "Objects", "Food", and "Rooms". The short book consists of multiple poems covering the everyday mundane. Stein's experimental use of language renders the poems unorthodox and their subjects unfamiliar.

Stein began composition of the book in 1912 with multiple short prose poems in an effort to "create a word relationship between the word and the things seen" using a "realist" perspective. She then published it in three sections as her second book in 1914.

Tender Buttons has provoked divided critical responses since its publication. It is renowned for its Modernist approach to portraying the everyday object and has been lauded as a "masterpiece of verbal Cubism". Its first poem, "A Carafe, That Is a Blind Glass", is arguably its most famous, and is often cited as one of the quintessential works of Cubist literature. The book has also been, however, criticized as "a modernist triumph, a spectacular failure, a collection of confusing gibberish, and an intentional hoax".

== Title ==
Like Stein's syntax of poems in the book, the title juxtaposes two familiar concepts to alienate their familiar meanings. Many of the titles of the individual poems likewise use similar juxtapositions: "Glazed Glitter", "A Piece of Coffee", etc.

Like the other poems in the book, the title can be read in a number of ways. Some have suggested that "tender buttons" is a reference to women's breasts, in part because of the title's evocation of nipples. Although a 1971 reaction to the poem stated, "The title Tender Buttons, of course, refers to a woman's nipples", Stein does not divulge the inspiration behind the title, simply stating, "Tender Buttons will be the title of the book".

== Interpretations ==
=== Stein and sexuality ===
Many scholars have likewise identified an underlying theme of lesbianism within Tender Buttons. In addition to the title's French implication of nipples, some have speculated that the poems reveal the intimacies of Stein's relationship with Alice B. Toklas. Phallic and vaginal symbolism are scattered throughout the poems, and Kathryn Kent, among others, has argued that Stein uses familiar objects to invite the reader to "tend her buttons" and indulge in Stein's "sexual/textual manipulations". Others have relied on a correlation between Stein's fascination with gazing on the subjects of her poems with Sigmund Freud's fetishization of the object to reveal this underlying theme of sexuality.

However, with reference to this critical approach of sexualizing Stein's images, Virgil Thomson, a personal friend and colleague of Stein's, said "Either meaning taken alone [i.e. the button as nipple or clitoris], since it bears no clear relation to the book, comes closer I think to straight pornography than was Miss Stein's taste or custom."

=== Stein and Cubism ===
Stein insisted on the book as being a "realistic" portrayal of everyday objects. Her first poem in "Food", "Roastbeef", describes what some have accepted to be the work's overarching manifesto, as it states, "Claiming nothing, not claiming anything, not a claim in everything, collecting claiming, all this makes a harmony, it even makes a succession". Rather than attempt to define and give meaning to the object or work of art, Stein instead "claims nothing" in an attempt to capture the object's "realistic" nature when stripped of the connotations of its typical representation.

Elsewhere, Stein insists on portraying a material world without using the object's preexisting name. She emphasizes the importance of sight, stating, "I was trying to live in looking, and looking was not to mix itself up with remembering", and "I did express what something was, a little by talking and listening to that thing, but a great deal by looking at that thing… I had the feeling that something should be included and that something was looking, and so concentrating on looking I did the Tender Buttons because it was easier to do objects than people if you were just looking".

Stein here reveals herself as a Cubist artist in her determination to reconfigure a one-sided perspective while revealing a subject's essence through multiple perspectives. She has additionally cited Pablo Picasso's influence on her work, stating, "I began to play with words then. I was a little obsessed by words of equal value. Picasso was painting my portrait at that time, and he and I used to talk this thing over endlessly. At the time he had just begun on Cubism". Stein likewise experiments with Cubist ideals in composition, stating, "Each part is as important as the whole".

Tender Buttons: The Corrected Centennial Edition (City Lights Publishers) was released in April 2014 to coincide with the 100th anniversary of its publication.
