= Francisco Riba Rovira =

Spanish painter (1913–2002)

Francisco Riba-Rovira also known as Francesc or Paco, (born Barcelona 1913, died Paris 2002) was a Spanish painter, from Catalonia.

== Biography ==
He worked to pay for his Beaux-Arts studies in Barcelona. He succeeded in this for one or two months before the start of the Spanish Civil War, in which he fought against the rebellion led by Francisco Franco against the established Government of the Second Spanish Republic. After the war he was forced into exile in France, first in Perpignan or near to be in a Camp as prisoner on a beach.

The Second World War began a few months later. In Gertrude Stein's exhibition preface, it notes that Riba-Rovira was arrested by the Gestapo. The Nazi soldiers who kept him prisoner were Netherlands Nazi SS. After an attempted escape for the second time he succeeded to escape from this camp, which was near Vannes in French Britain, he chose the day it was raining a lot for impeach the dogs feeling after him. And for that he had to fight against one Nazi SS Dutch soldier. He did it. After the war he talked about, that he learned what a few days after he escapes from the camp, a train was made by the Nazis for red Spanish republican soldiers for expedition to Mathausen. And very few people know that this Mathausen camp was harder than Dachau and even Buchenwald Dora just below Auschwitz for concentration camp part. Mathausen was the only one concentration camp put in the category number 3.

He met Gertrude Stein when she was passing by with her dog "Basket" on the Seine docks. The following is a translation from Stein's preface to the exhibition by Francisco Riba-Rovira at Roquepine Gallery in May 1945:

It is inevitable that when we really need someone we find him. The person you need attracts you like a magnet. I returned to Paris after these long years spent in the countryside and I needed a young painter, a young painter who would awaken me. Paris was magnificent, but where was the young painter? I looked everywhere: at my contemporaries and their followers. I walked a lot, I looked everywhere, in all the galleries, but the young painter was not there. Yes, I walk a lot, a lot at the edge of the Seine where we fish, where we paint, where we walk dogs (I am one of those who walk their dogs). Not a single young painter! One day, on the corner of a street, in one of these small streets in my district, I saw a man painting. I looked at him; at him and at his painting, as I always look at everybody who creates something I have an indefatigable curiosity to look and I was moved. Yes, a young painter! We began to speak, because we speak easily, as easily as in country roads, in the small streets of the district. His story was the sad story of the young people of our time. A young Spaniard who studied in fine arts in Barcelona: civil war; exile; a concentration camp; escape. Gestapo, another prison, another escape. Eight lost years! If they were lost, who knows? And now a little misery, but all the same the painting. Why did I find that it was him the young painter, why? I visited his drawings, his painting: we speak. I explained that for me, all modern painting is based on what Cézanne nearly made, instead of basing itself on what he almost managed to make. When he could not make a thing, he hijacked it and left it. He insisted on showing his incapacity: he spread his lack of success: showing what he could not do, became an obsession for him. People influenced by him were also obsessed by the things which they could not reach and they began the system of camouflage. It was natural to do so, even inevitable:that soon became an art, in peace and in war, and Matisse concealed and insisted at the same time on that Cézanne could not realize, and Picasso concealed, played and tormented all these things. The only one who wanted to insist on this problem, was Juan Gris. He persisted by deepening the things which Cézanne wanted to do, but it was too hard a task for him: it killed him. And now here we are, I find a young painter who does not follow the tendency to play with what Cézanne could not do, but who attacks any right the things which he tried to make, to create the objects which have to exist, for, and in themselves, and not in relation. This young painter has his weakness and his strength. His force will push him in this road. I am fascinated and that is why he is the young painter who I needed. He is Francisco Riba-Rovira.

– Sources:

Riba-Rovira belongs the artistic institution the Modern School of Paris. When Rovira was living in Paris, before staying on Guénégaud Street where his flat "atelier" was, he went for a short time in front of the Seine near the Notre Dame de Paris, in the building just in front of the Police Prefecture where Matisse got his work place. But Paco, as he was nicknamed did not stay there long. So Guénégaud street was his main residence in France where he stays still his end of his life.

He did an exposition in 1954 in Bernheim-Jeune in Paris, and in 1955 in Passedoit Gallery in New York.

Riba-Rovira often said that it was very difficult for a painter born after the Impressionists, although he was influenced significantly by the Impressionist style. Sisley and Pissarro were among his major inspirations. With the Spanish painters, Riba-Rovira had a preference for Goya, and admiration for Goya's political views throughout Goya's artworks.

Not to quote even how his meeting with Bazile Muro by 1983 that is approximately six years after his meeting with Sahagun former Minister of Defence of the democratic transition in Spain and the attempt of coup d'état on the seventies last century.

Basilio Muro indeed moved at least twice in Paris in his artist workplace studio of the street Guénégaud next to street of the Seine river and the Pont Neuf in the district St Germain des Prés to see his works.

Her portrait appearing in the catalog, with the Gertrude Stein's preface, in first place in the plaque of display for the exhibition of Gallerie Roquépine on 1945 is displayed for approximately one year since last June in successively several places in the U.S.A. We speak naturally about the portrait of Gertrude Stein by Riba-Rovira on 1945. Perhaps the last one made by a painter before she died.

And you can see it now.

The series of exhibitions began with a focus on the Stein family collection in the United States. The family's collection, including a previously unknown portrait unseen for over 65 years, was displayed in San Francisco from June to September, then in Washington from October to January, and finally at the Museum of Modern Art in New York from February to June 2012. The portrait is also featured in the catalogs of these international exhibitions.

== Publications ==
"Dibujos de Riba-Rovira, Cuadernos del Arte n°54 Edicion Europa by SAHAGUN 1976 Coleccion Maestros contemporaneos del dibujo y la pintura " you can see in about fifty works. It is the only place we know and found after historic research about this artist.

== Exhibitions ==
- Galería Roquépine de París on may and November 1945 with the Preface by Gertrude Stein with the Portrait of Gertrude Stein in the first place in the catalog.
- 1945 Exposicion de Arte Catalan Moderno. Con Picasso, Juan Miro, Fonseret etc. Por "Prisonniers et Déportés et autres œuvres sociales de SOLIDARITE CATALANE", Gallerie de Arte Altarriba Paris 6è.
- 1949 Exhibition in "The Palace of the Legion of Honor" (now part of the Fine Arts Museum of San Francisco);The Portrait of Gertrude Stein by Riba-Rovira.
- 1950 Exhibition "Salon Réalités Nouvelles de Paris" with the picture "L'Arlequin" (now in the collection "Galeria Muro" Valencia, Spain,)
- Bienal de Menton (1951)
- 1952 Exposicion Galerie La Boetie salon des Jeunes Peintres Paris con Pelayo, Rebeyrolle.
- 1952 Exposicion Salle André Bauger
- Galería Bernheim, en 1954, con gran aceptación de la crítica y éxito de ventas.
- Passedoit-Gallery de Nueva York (1955)
- 1955 Exposicion "Homenaje a Machado", Maison de la Pensée Française, 2 rue de l’Elysée. Con Picasso, Pelayo, Peinado, Juan Miro etc.
- Salon de la Jeune Peinture y Salon d´Octobreen de París (1957)
- Museum of Modern Art de Cincinnati (1962)
- Deutsch - Ibero - Amerikanische de Frankfort (1959)
- Salon des Independents participa de 1960 a 1965
- Salon de I´Automne de 1966 a 1969
- Salon des Surindependentsen (1975)
- 1980 Exposicion Galerie Claude Renaud Paris
- 1983 Galeria Muro Valencia España
- 1985 Exposicion PLACA Pinturas y sculturas contemporenos F.I.A.P. Paris
- 2011 Exhibition "Seeing Gertrude Stein: Five Stories" with the portrait of Gertrude Stein by Riba-Rovira, San Francisco.
- 2011/2012 Exhibition "Seeing Gertrude Stein: Five Stories" with the portrait of Gertrude Stein by Riba-Rovira, Washington.

NOW YOU CAN :

- The Steins Collect 23 February-3 June 2012 Metropolitan Metropolitan Museum of Art of New York In this exhibition after San Francisco and Washington you can see the portrait of Gertrude Stein by Riba-Rovira with Picasso, Picabia, Matisse, Cézanne and the others...
- Exhibition Galeria Muro Valencia Spain March/June 2012 "Homenaje a Gertrude Stein" by Francisco Riba-Rovira.
- Exhibition Galeria Muro Valencia Spain March/April 2013 "L'Arlequin" by Francisco Riba-Rovira.
