= Bernard Faÿ =

French historian (1893–1978)

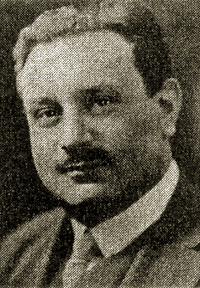
- Born: 3 April 1893; Paris, France
- Died: 31 December 1978 (aged 85); Tours, France
- Writing career
- Movement: Modernist literature

Marie Louis Emmanuel Bernard Faÿ (French pronunciation: [bɛʁnaʁ fa.i]; 3 April 1893 – 31 December 1978) was a French historian who served as an official under Vichy France. He is known for his close friendship with Gertrude Stein, who avoided Nazi persecution and collaborated with the Vichy regime under his protection.

Faÿ studied and taught history in France and the United States and became a respected historian of Franco-American relations in interwar France. Despite his arch-conservative views, Faÿ was deeply embedded in Paris' prewar cultural scene. As the general administrator of the Bibliothèque Nationale under the German occupation and head of anti-Masonic service of the Vichy Government, he oversaw the persecution of French Freemasons from 1940 to 1944. After the end of the Second World War, he was convicted of indignité nationale and sentenced to life in prison. He escaped after five years and resumed teaching history in Switzerland, where he played a role in the founding of the Society of St. Pius XI.

== Life ==
Faÿ was born in Paris. He studied at Harvard and wrote numerous books concerning Franco-American relations, American history, and contemporary American politics. He met the Jewish American expatriate writer Gertrude Stein in 1926 and subsequently became the primary translator of Stein's works, including The Making of Americans, into French. According to Alice B. Toklas, Faÿ became her "dearest friend during her life". Faÿ arranged Stein's 1933–34 book tour for The Autobiography of Alice B. Toklas, which significantly increased her celebrity.

At the beginning of World War II, he was a professor at the Collège de France. During the occupation of France by Germany, he replaced Julien Cain as general administrator of the Bibliothèque Nationale and director of the anti-Masonic service of the Vichy Government. During his tenure of his office, his secretary, Gueydan de Roussel, was in charge of preparing the card indexes, containing 60,000 names drawn from archives seized from Freemason and other secret societies (Marshal Philippe Pétain was convinced that the indexes were at the heart of all France's troubles). Lists of names of Freemasons were released to the official gazette of the Vichy government for publication, and many Catholic papers copied these lists to induce public opprobrium. Faÿ edited and published during the four years of the Occupation the monthly review Les Documents maçonniques ("Masonic Documents"), which published historical studies of Freemasonry, essays on the role of Freemasonry in society and frank anti-Masonic propaganda.

During Faÿ's tenure with the Vichy regime, 989 Freemasons were sent to concentration camps, where 549 were shot. In addition, about 3,000 lost their jobs. All Freemasons were required by law to declare themselves to authorities. In 1943 Faÿ produced the film Forces Occultes, directed by Jean Mamy, which depicts a worldwide Jewish-Freemason conspiracy.

Despite his anti-Semitism, Faÿ, who was suspected to be a Gestapo agent for much of the occupation, protected Gertrude Stein and Alice B. Toklas. Following the liberation, Stein wrote a letter on Faÿ's behalf when he was tried as a collaborator. In 1946 a French court condemned him to dégradation nationale and forced labor for life, but he managed to escape to Switzerland in 1951, funding to facilitate his prison breakout coming from Alice B. Toklas. Faÿ was pardoned by French President René Coty in 1959.

Appointed to an instructorship at the Institut de la Langue française in Fribourg, Switzerland, he was later forced to resign in the face of student protests. He taught French literature to American junior-year-abroad students in the 1960s at the Villa des Fougères in Fribourg, run by the Dominican sisters of Rosary College (now Dominican University) in River Forest, Illinois.

During the 1960s, he also taught at a girls' high school, Le Grand Verger, in Lutry, Switzerland, a short distance east of Lausanne on the northern border of Lake Geneva (Lac Leman). There he instructed American and other national girls in American history. His method consisted of notecard lectures and knowledge he carried in his head. He particularly shone in his art history class in which he taught from illustrated postcards of paintings, drawings and sculptures, as well as anecdotes derived from personal association with many expatriate artists in Paris from the preceding decades. In the European educational tradition, he demanded precise and voluminous feedback of his lecture material in tests. (ref on Le Grand Verger entry by former student, Janine Dawn Lieberman, 1962.)

In 1969, Faÿ is credited with being one of those who convinced Archbishop Marcel Lefebvre, the retired Superior General of the Holy Ghost Fathers, to start a new seminary in Fribourg for traditional Catholics disquieted by the changes wrought by the Second Vatican Council in the formation of priests.

== Works ==
=== History and literary history ===
- 1925 : Bibliographie critique des ouvrages français relatifs aux États-Unis (1770–1800)
- 1925 : L'esprit révolutionnaire en France et aux États-Unis à la fin du XVIIIe siècle
- 1925 : Panorama de la littérature contemporaine
- 1926 : L'Empire américain et sa démocratie en 1926
- 1927 : Faites vos jeux
- 1928 : Vue cavalière de la littérature américaine contemporaine
- 1929 : Benjamin Franklin, bourgeois d'Amérique
- 1930 : Le Comte Arthur de Gobineau et la Grèce
- 1930 : Essai sur la poésie
- 1932 : George Washington, gentilhomme
- 1932 : La Gloire du Comte Arthur de Gobineau
- 1935 : La Franc-maçonnerie et la révolution intellectuelle du XVIIIe siècle
- 1937 : Les forces de l'Espagne : voyage à Salamanque
- 1939 : Civilisation américaine
- 1939 : L'Homme, mesure de l'histoire. La recherche du temps
- 1943 : L'Agonie de l'Empereur (récit historique)
- 1952 : De la prison de ce monde, journal, prières et pensées (1944–1952)
- 1959 : La grande révolution
- 1961 : L'École de l'imprécation ou Les Prophètes catholiques du dernier siècle (1850–1950)
- 1961 : Louis XVI ou la fin d'un monde
- 1962 : L'aventure coloniale
- 1965 : Naissance d'un monstre, l'opinion publique
- 1966 : Les Précieux
- 1969 : La Guerre des trois fous, Hitler, Staline, Roosevelt
- 1970 : L'Église de Judas?
- 1970 : Beaumarchais ou les Fredaines de Figaro
- 1974 : Jean-Jacques Rousseau ou le Rêve de la vie
- 1978 : Rivarol et la Révolution

Prefaces

- Le duc de Montmorency-Luxembourg, premier baron chrétien de France, fondateur du Grand Orient : sa vie et ses archives de Paul Filleul

=== Pseudonyms ===
Bernard Faÿ used the pen name Elphège du Croquet de l'Esq for the work:

- "Pensées, maximes et apophtègmes choisis des moralistes français et étrangers à l'usage de la jeunesse studieuse" (1954) for Du conquistador in 1957, with a preface by Bernard Faÿ.

=== Translations ===
- 1933 : Co-translation and preface for the French edition of Gertrude Stein's The Making of Americans: Being a History of a Family's Progress
- 1934 : Translation for the French edition of Gertrude Stein's The Autobiography of Alice B. Toklas

=== Works in English ===
- Franklin, the Apostle of Modern Times, Little, Brown, and Company, 1929.
- The American Experiment, Harcourt, Brace and company, 1929.
- George Washington: Republican Aristocrat, Houghton Mifflin Company, 1931.
- Roosevelt and His America, Little, Brown & Company, 1933.
- The Two Franklins: Fathers of American Democracy, Little, Brown, and company, 1933.
- Louis XVI; or, The End of a World, translated by Patrick O'Brien, Henry Regnery Company, 1967.

=== Articles ===
- "France and American Opinion," The Living Age, 22 July 1922.
- "The Intellectual Tastes of the American Public," The Living Age, 27 January 1923.
- "The Modern Writers of French Prose," The Living Age, 31 January 1925.
- "Tendencies and Groups in France," The Saturday Review, 31 January 1925.
- "French Literature and the Peasant," The Living Age, 1 December 1926.
- "Julian Green, Francophile," The Saturday Review, 18 June 1927.
- "France Dissected," The Forum, July 1927.
- "Take Your Choice," The Forum, October 1927.
- "His Excellency Mr. Franklin," The Forum, March 1928.
- "Protestant America," The Living Age, August 1928.
- "Catholic America," The Living Age, September 1928.
- "A Lucky Man," The Saturday Review, 19 October 1929.
- "Revolution as an Art," The Saturday Review, 22 March 1930.
- "Can America Rescue England?," The Living Age, 15 May 1930.
- "The French Nation," The Saturday Review, 14 June 1930.
- "In Our Stars," The Forum, January 1933.
- "A Rose Is a Rose", The Saturday Review, 2 September 1933.
- "A Scotchman's View of Our Democracy," The Saturday Review, 7 October 1933.
- "French Freaks for English Readers," The Saturday Review, 7 December 1935.
- "The Rise and Fall of Symbolism," The Saturday Review, 11 January 1936.
