= Luiz Päetow =

Brazilian theatre director, actor and playwright

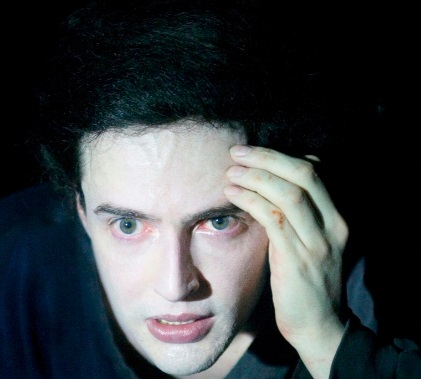
- Born: 1979 (age 46–47)
- Education: School of Communications and Arts, University of São Paulo
- Occupations: theatre director, actor, playwright
- Years active: 1990–present
- Known for: created the experimental Prêt-à-Porter

Luiz Päetow (born 1979) is a Brazilian theatre director, actor and playwright.

== Early life and education ==
Päetow started working at age 11, with several productions of the British Council Theatre Group in São Paulo, including plays by William Shakespeare, Federico Garcia Lorca, Nelson Rodrigues, and also musicals by Cole Porter with guest director Nancy Diuguid. Later, he entered the Conservatory for Dramatic Arts (located inside the School of Communications and Arts) and acted in Peter Weiss' Marat/Sade, Tennessee Williams' The Glass Menagerie, Arnold Wesker's The Kitchen, Bertolt Brecht's The Baden-Baden Lesson on Consent. As a child, he also developed cinephilia, attending international film festivals where, after seven years, he was allowed to work as an interpreter for the jury members Abbas Kiarostami, Artavazd Peleshyan, Béla Tarr and Oja Kodar. At age 19, he audited a master's degree course on Pier Paolo Pasolini.

== Career ==
Between 1996 and 2001, Päetow became a central player for CPT (Centre for Theatre Research). During this period, he created the experimental Prêt-à-Porter. For this specific project, he directed, wrote and starred in five plays: Passengers, Under the Bridge, No Concert, Hours of Punishment and Wings of the Shadow. His documents were also published later in book form, along with essays by Renato Janine Ribeiro and Olgária Matos, among others. In 1998, he worked as assistant director to Daniela Thomas on Anton Chekhov's The Seagull, starring Fernanda Montenegro and Fernanda Torres. In 1999, he worked on The Trojan Fragments which received the Theatre Shell Award and the Art Critics' Association Prize. This production had its world-premiere at the Istanbul International Theatre Festival and was also presented at the second Theatre Olympics in Shizuoka, where Päetow represented Brazil on the International Committee, with Tadashi Suzuki, Robert Wilson, Yuri Lyubimov, Nuria Espert and Theodoros Terzopoulos. At this meeting, they discussed the performing arts of the next century. In 2000, he debuted as an opera director with Henry Purcell's The Fairy-Queen.

Thanks to arrangements between CPT and CICT (International Centre for Theatre Creation), Päetow was then allowed to watch the final rehearsals for Peter Brook's Hamlet, at the Théâtre des Bouffes du Nord, with Adrian Lester. This year spent in Paris also enabled conversations with Cristiana Reali for a future collaboration on his, still unproduced, new play Washed-up Doc, and with Claire Denis and Chantal Akerman, during her retrospective at the Studio des Ursulines, aimed at further developing his Prêt-à-Porter's transfer from stage to screen. Before moving to Berlin, he took part in Jean Babilée's open masterclass at the Ballet de l'Opéra national de Paris. The following year, he reconnected with Sasha Waltz, with whom he had trained five years before, during her workshops at FID (São Paulo International Dance Festival).

In 2003, Päetow played the lead in the first Brazilian production of Sarah Kane's 4.48 Psychosis, which ran nonstop until April 2004. After this, he presented, at the Volksbühne, the marathon of five plays Rebellion in the Backlands, staged by Zé Celso. In 2006, he created his first solo, entitled Plays, based on the lecture written by Gertrude Stein, to whom he also devoted a three-day event examining her life and works. In the same year, he performed the title role in Georg Büchner's Leonce and Lena, directed by Gabriel Villela, nominated as best actor by the Art Critics' Association. In 2007, Päetow directed his adaptation of Clarice Lispector's novel Água Viva. Then, commissioned by the Satyrianas Festival, he wrote the play Heaven in Heat, which was presented under the pseudonym Zita Woulpe, an anagram of his name. In 2008, he starred in two productions: Cascando and Words & Music by Samuel Beckett. In 2009, he directed Music-Hall by Jean-Luc Lagarce, which he also translated and created the set/lighting designs, thus receiving the Theatre Shell Award. In 2010, he created his second solo, the endless Abracadabra, nominated for the Shell Awards.

In 2011, Päetow premiered his third solo, Ex-Machines. Back to Berlin, he developed a partnership with two musical ensembles, Klank and Trio Nexus, in order to create his play Der Hausierer, freely based on the novel The Peddler by Peter Handke. This launched his project Taeter, aimed at empowering anonymous voices and performed at undisclosed venues. The next year, he directed two dance pieces: Occurrences and Or Memory Reinvented, both recipients of the São Paulo City Hall Dance Sponsorship. In 2014, he presented a new solo, Lazarus, his adaptation of Hilda Hilst's homonymous short story. Then, he coordinated an artistic residency inside the ruins of a historic movie theater, where he presented open rehearsals for W, his next creation. In the same year, Päetow's previous plays were published in a three-volume box set. He would also start his second opera direction with Four Saints in Three Acts, libretto by Gertrude Stein. In 2015, invited by Felipe Hirsch, he took part in Puzzle, performing the poetry of Haroldo de Campos, Paulo Leminski and Gregório de Matos.

In 2019, Päetow's poem Theatre Capsule was published, with the first Brazilian translation of Gertrude Stein's Ida: A Novel. After this, he started rehearsals for Sodom Gomorrah, stylized as $ODOM\G/OMORRAH, the posthumous play by Antunes Filho. The premiere moved from April 2020 to November 2021, due to the coronavirus pandemic. In the meantime, Päetow debuted as a filmmaker with Transmission and Transition, a double feature inspired by elements of the play. The cast included Matheus Nachtergaele, Grace Passô and Christian Malheiros. A scientific paper linked his film to the semiotic cruelty of Antonin Artaud. The live theater version, namely Theatron, ran for six months, until August 2022 at the Oficina, chosen as the world's best theatre by The Guardian. Receiving great acclaim, the press also pointed out that his creation would, certainly, impact current ways of consuming culture. Next, he earned critical praise for his performance in the opera Ariadne auf Naxos, conducted by Felix Krieger. In 2023, invited by the University of São Paulo, Päetow lectured on myth and future memories, along with Ailton Krenak and other artists.

== Awards and nominations ==
- Theatre Shell - nomination for Abracadabra (2011)
- Theatre Shell - award for Music-Hall (2010)
- Art Critics' Association - nomination for Leonce and Lena (2007)
- Brazil's Artistic Quality - nomination for 4.48 Psychosis (2004)
- Theatre Shell - award for Prêt-à-Porter (1998-2008)
- Art Critics' Association - award for The Trojan Fragments (2000)
- Theatre Shell - award for The Trojan Fragments (2000)
