= Rose is a rose is a rose is a rose =

Famous sentence

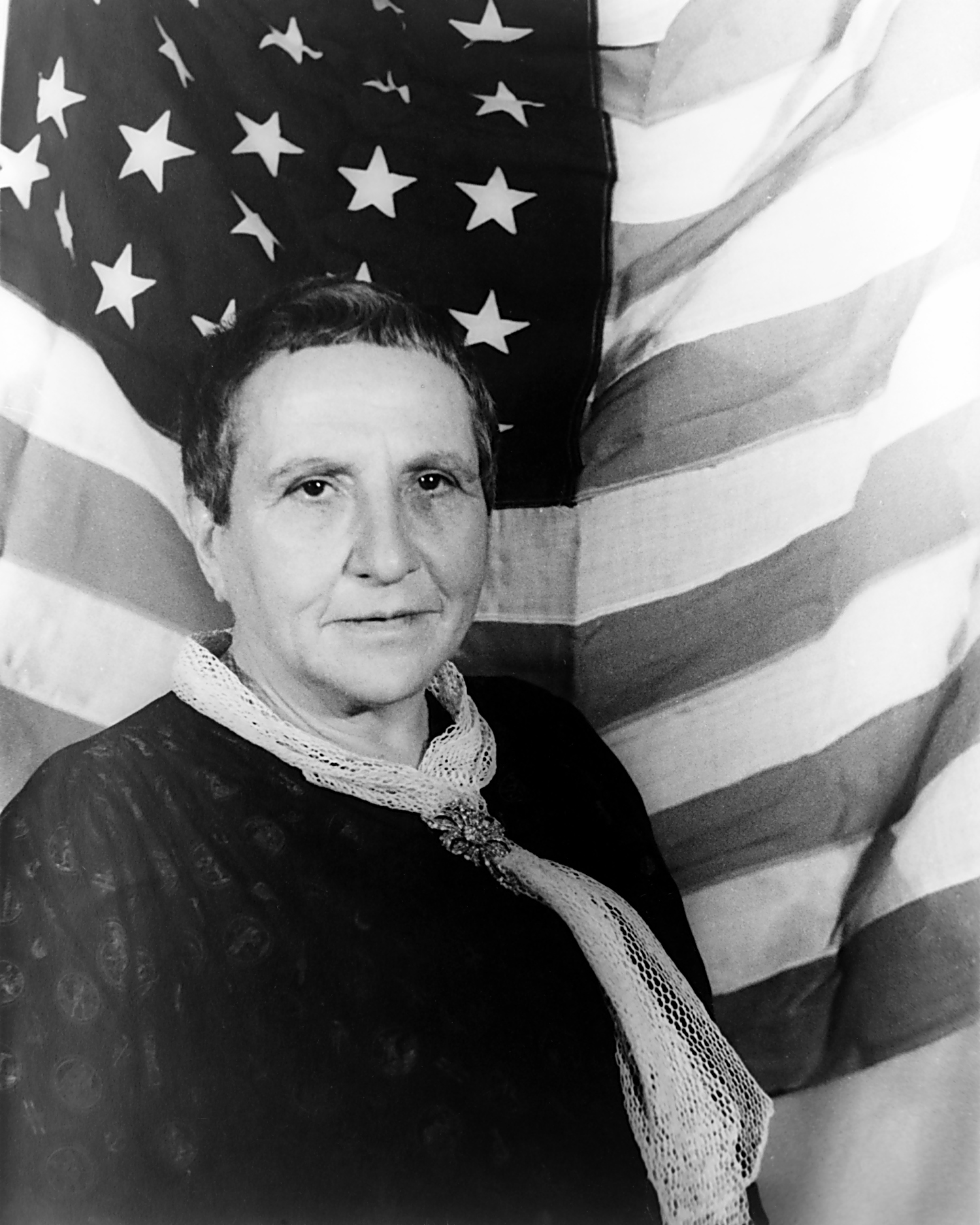
Gertrude Stein, 1935

The sentence "Rose is a rose is a rose is a rose" was written by Gertrude Stein as part of the 1913 poem "Sacred Emily", which appeared in the 1922 book Geography and Plays. In that poem, the first "Rose" is the name of a person. Stein later used variations on the sentence in other writings, and the shortened form "A rose is a rose is a rose" is among her most famous quotations, often interpreted as meaning "things are what they are", a statement of the law of identity, "A is A."

In Stein's view, the sentence expresses the fact that simply using the name of a thing already invokes the imagery and emotions associated with it, an idea also intensively discussed in the problem of universals debate where Peter Abelard and others used the rose as an example concept. The quotation diffused through her own writing, and the culture at large. In Four in America, Stein wrote, "Now listen! I'm no fool. I know that in daily life we don't go around saying 'is a ... is a ... is a ...' Yes, I'm no fool; but I think that in that line the rose is red for the first time in English poetry for a hundred years."

She said to an audience at Oxford University that the statement referred to the fact that when the Romantics used the word "rose", it had a direct relationship to an actual rose. For later periods in literature this would no longer be true. The eras following Romanticism, notably the modern era, use the word rose to refer to the actual rose, yet they also imply, through the use of the word, the archetypical elements of the romantic era.

== Mentions of "rose" in "Sacred Emily" ==
The following lines appear at widely separated places in "Sacred Emily":

- It is rose in hen.
- Jack Rose Jack Rose.

== Versions by others ==
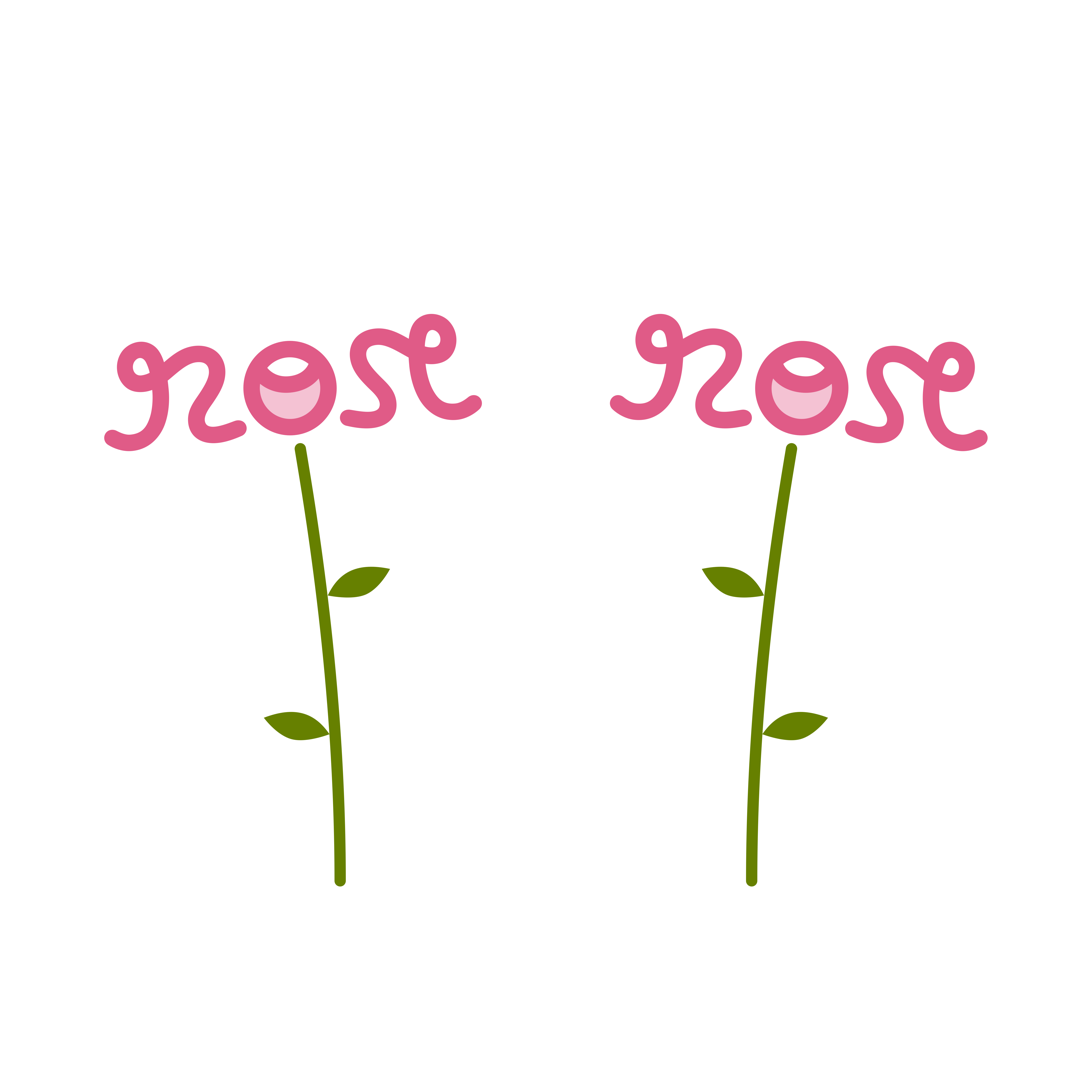
Mirror ambigram of Rose rose. In French, "rose" translates to "pink", thus "rose rose" means "pink rose".

- "Rose is a rose is a rose is a rose." ("Sacred Emily", Geography and Plays)
- "Do we suppose that all she knows is that a rose is a rose is a rose is a rose." (Operas and Plays)
- "... she would carve on the tree Rose is a Rose is a Rose is a Rose is a Rose until it went all the way around." (The World is Round)
- "A rose tree may be a rose tree may be a rosy rose tree if watered." (Alphabets and Birthdays)
- "Indeed a rose is a rose makes a pretty plate...." (Stanzas in Meditation)
- "When I said.

A rose is a rose is a rose is a rose.
And then later made that into a ring I made poetry and what did I do I caressed completely caressed and addressed a noun." (Lectures in America)

- "Civilization begins with a rose. A rose is a rose is a rose is a rose. It continues with blooming and it fastens clearly upon excellent examples." (As Fine as Melanctha)
- "Lifting belly can please me because it is an occupation I enjoy.

Rose is a rose is a rose is a rose.
In print on top." (Bee Time Vine)

== See also ==
- Alliteration
- Law of identity
- Proof by assertion
- Rhetorical device
- Rule of three (writing)
- Tautophrase
- A rose by any other name would smell as sweet
