= Mary Bookstaver =

American feminist (1875–1950)

Mary A. Bookstaver (1875–1950) was a feminist, political activist, and editor, widely known by the nickname "May."

== Biography ==
Daughter of Judge Henry W. Bookstaver and Mary Baily Young, she attended Miss Florence Baldwin's School (now Baldwin School) and graduated from Bryn Mawr College in 1898 in history and political science. After graduation she moved to Baltimore, Maryland, where she was part of a circle of lesbian Bryn Mawr graduates, including Bookstaver's lover, Mabel Haynes. Gertrude Stein, then a Johns Hopkins University School of Medicine student, became infatuated with Bookstaver, who found Stein's naïveté literally laughable, but introduced Stein to physical love. The experience made a deep impression on Stein, whose first novel, QED, completed in Baltimore in 1903, was an autobiographical account of this love triangle, with Bookstaver's character named "Helen Thomas."

In 1906 Bookstaver married Charles E. Knoblauch (1870–1934), a broker on the New York Stock Exchange and Rough Rider veteran of the Spanish–American War, at her father's summer cottage in Newport, Rhode Island. After a honeymoon in Europe, she and her husband lived in "The Wyoming" in New York City. She adopted the style of "Mrs. Charles E. Knoblauch."

She carried Gertrude Stein's manuscript 'word portraits' of Matisse and Picasso to Alfred Stieglitz's Camera Work office at 291 Fifth Avenue, (Little Galleries of the Photo-Secession) and insisted that Stieglitz publish them, which he did in the August 1912 edition of Camera Work, a special edition devoted to Picasso and Matisse. This was Stein's first publication.

As Stieglitz recounted the episode, "In December 1911, or perhaps it was January 1912, a huge woman leading a huge Boston bulldog entered 291. She had a portfolio filled with manuscripts under her arm. It was a funny sight to see the woman with her bulldog and bursting portfolio in that tiny room."

The dog, named Kuroki, was a French bull terrier which became famous when Bookstaver took him for a walk in 1915 "without any muzzle over his inconsequential nose," (as reported by The New York Times) a violation of health regulations. Her lawyer Bertha Rembaugh argued "as long as children weren't muzzled dogs should not be …" The case failed, and Bookstaver paid a fine. Also in 1915 she sold her deceased father's house, a four-story townhouse that still stands at 24 East 64th Street, New York City.

She was later on the Board of Directors of New York Women's Publishing Company, the publisher of Margaret Sanger's Birth Control Review, which she served as editor of from February 1919.

She translated Guillaume Apollinaire's 1913 Les Peintres cubistes [Méditations Esthétiques] as The Cubist Painters, Aesthetic Meditations published in The Little Review in three parts in 1922.

Childless and a widow from 1934, Bookstaver died in New York City in 1950. Alice B. Toklas jealously demanded Stein burn Bookstaver's letters. Her other papers are scattered or destroyed; some are held at Yale University as part of their Gertrude Stein collection.
