= Doctor Faustus Lights the Lights =

Libretto for an opera by Gertrude Stein

- Librettist: Gertrude Stein
- Premiere: 1951; Beaver College

Doctor Faustus Lights the Lights (1938) is a libretto for an opera by the American modernist playwright and poet Gertrude Stein. The text has become a rite of passage for avant-garde theatre artists from the United States: La MaMa Experimental Theatre Club, Judson Poets' Theater, The Living Theatre, Richard Foreman, Robert Wilson, and The Wooster Group have all produced the piece.

== Background ==
Stein wrote the piece during what critics often refer to as the final or narrative period of her playwriting career. From 1932 onwards, she had begun to rediscover and reintegrate stories into her dramatic writing, an element hitherto she had worked to exclude. In a letter to Carl Van Vechten, Stein identified her work on this piece as a breakthrough: "I have been struggling with this problem of dramatic narrative and in Doctor Faustus Lights the Lights I think I got it." Despite her newfound use for narrative, Stein did not, as scholar Betsy Alayne Ryan states, "leap foolishly into ordinary comprehensibility."

Lord Berners had adapted Stein's play They must. Be wedded. To their wife. (1931) into his choral ballet A Wedding Bouquet (1937), and he commissioned a new text from her, intending to compose the music himself. She wrote Doctor Faustus Lights the Lights for Berners in 1938, but he was unable to write the score. In 1949 Virgil Thomson considered writing the music, but he was dissuaded by Alice B. Toklas, then Stein's literary executor.

== Structure ==
The structure of action in Doctor Faustus Lights the Lights does not resemble that which is traditionally thought to constitute a play. The progressive development of a coherent plot that unfolds through the interaction between a configuration of figures is just discernible. These include Faustus’ relationship to Mephisto, Faustus and Marguerite Ida and Helena Annabel, and the pairings of minor characters (Boy and Dog, Boy and Girl, Dog Mephisto and Viper, Country Woman Viper and MIHA, the Man from Overseas and Faustus, he and MIHA). The text does not allow for a stable diagramming or coherent identities. Like the speech-headings in Elizabethan and Jacobean texts, Stein describes her characters in a number of different ways, suggesting some degree of multiplicity in her conception of dramatic character (most explicitly present in the multiple characterization of "Marguerite Ida and Helena Annabel").

The play adopts a number of textual strategies that presuppose a relationship to performance, though it is performance conceived in a distinctly modernist way: as spatial meaning (like Artaud's mise en scène or Brecht's Gestus), self-referential (as Beckett's work increasingly became or as in Brechtian quotation), and unconstrained by any adherence to the conventions associated with traditional dramatic literature (from which each of these practitioners have displayed varying degrees of independence). Like Beckett, Stein is interested in an aesthetic of surfaces - of formal elements interacting in space - which do not serve the traditional purpose of the imitation of action. The aesthetic assumptions about performance embodied in Doctor Faustus Lights the Lights and the ambiguity in its textual composition produce elements unanchored from a referential process towards any reality other than its own occasion; it suggests a fully self-referential performance.

== Plot ==
The piece opens with Faustus (his precise name shifts and alters throughout the piece) looking out from the doorway to his study, which streams with intense white light from beyond, when Mephisto appears:

Faustus growls out.—The devil what the devil what do I care if the devil is there.
Mephisto says. But Doctor Faustus dear yes I am here.
Doctor Faustus. What do I care there is no here nor there. What am I. I am Doctor Faustus who knows everything can do everything and you say it was through you but not at all, if I had not been in a hurry and if I had taken my time I would have known how to make white electric light and day-light and night light and what did I do I saw you miserable devil I saw you and I was deceived and I believed miserable devil I thought I needed you, and I thought I was tempted by the devil and I know no temptation is tempting unless the devil tells you so. And you wanted my soul what the hell did you want my soul for, how do you know I have a soul, who says so nobody says so but you the devil and everybody knows the devil is all lies, so how do you know how do I know that I have a soul to sell how do you know Mr. Devil oh Mr. Devil how can you tell you can not tell anything and I I who know everything I keep on having so much light that light is not bright and what after all is the use of light, you can see just as well without it, you can go around just as well without it you can get up and go to bed just as well without it, and I I wanted to make it and the devil take it yes you devil you do not even want it and I sold my soul to make it. I have made it but have I a soul to pay for it.
Mephisto coming nearer and trying to pat his arm.
Yes dear Doctor Faustus yes of course you have a soul of course you have, do not believe them when they say the devil lies, you know the devil never lies, he deceives oh yes he deceives but that is not lying no dear please dear Doctor Faustus do not say the devil lies."
Doctor Faustus Lights the Lights (act one, scene one)

Despite this opening, Stein proceeds to marginalize the Faustian struggle between good and evil within the breast of Man, which is traditionally played out through the relation between Faustus and Mephistopheles, in favour of a conflict (if the play can be said to have a dramatic conflict in the traditional sense of the word) between Faustus and "Marguerite Ida and Helena Annabel." In Doctor Faustus Lights the Lights, Stein - a highly-experimental modernist writer - dramatizes an archetypal modernist myth (of Man's uneasy relationship with his machines) from the competing - and gendered - perspective(s) of the multiple woman.

== Staged productions ==
- The libretto premiered as a play at Beaver College (now Arcadia University) in 1951, at the launch of the college's theatre program.
- Boston University LaMaMa performed Doctor Faustus Lights the Lights, directed by Maxine Klein and with music by Marilyn Pasekoff, at La MaMa Experimental Theatre Club in May 1972.
- Judson Poets' Theater staged Doctor Faustus Lights the Lights October 26–November 19, 1979. Directed by Lawrence Kornfeld, Music: Al Carmines, Set: Edward Lazansky, Costumes: Theo Barnes, Lighting: Victor En Yu Tan, Musical Director: Michael Kelly. Cast: Jeff Weiss, Al Carmines, Zoelle Montgomery, Florence Tarlow, Nathaniel Bucknell, Stephen English, Aramis Estevez, Sarah Kornfeld, Jackie Beech, Essie Borden, Lou Bullock, Esteban Chalbaud, Wendell Cordtz, Craig Kuehl, Barbara Sandek, Maggie Wise. Stage Manager: Allison Peck, Assistant Director: Jason Buzas
- Robert Wilson directed and designed Doctor Faustus Lights the Lights in April 1992 at the Hebbel Theater, with music by Hans Peter Kuhn. This production was also performed at Lincoln Center in August 1992. Assistant directors: Ann Christin Rommen, Claudia Bosse and Christoph Roos. Lighting: Heinrich Brunke and Andreas Fuchs. Dramaturg: Peter Krumme. Choreography: Suzushi Hanayagi. Costumes: Hans Thiemann, Andreas Auerbach, Anja Duklau, Marie Juliane Friedrich, Peter Pelzmann and Petra Peters.
- The Yale School of Drama staged Doctor Faustus Lights the Lights in 2011 as a student directing thesis project.
- The Yale University Theater Studies department staged Doctor Faustus Lights the Lights in 2019 as a senior project production for Ryan Seffinger and Emil Ernström.
- The University of Pittsburgh Theatre Arts department staged Doctor Faustus Lights the Lights in 2019 as a lab production.
- The University of Barcelona staged Doctor Faustus Lights the Lights in 2000 at the Grec Festival, translated to Catalan by Teresa Requena and directed by Pedro Gurrola.

== Works cited ==
- Bowers, Jane Palatini. 1991. "They Watch Me as They Watch This": Gertrude Stein's Metadrama. Philadelphia: University of Pennsylvania Press. ISBN 0-8122-3057-4.
- Marranca, Bonnie. 1994. "Introduction: Presence of Mind." In Last Operas and Plays by Gertrude Stein. Ed. Carl van Vechten. Baltimore and London: The Johns Hopkins University Press, 1995. ISBN 0-8018-4985-3. p. vii–xxvii.
- Ryan, Betsy Alayne. 1984. Gertrude Stein's Theatre of the Absolute. Theater and Dramatic Studies Ser., 21. Ann Arbor and London: UMI Research Press. ISBN 0-8357-2021-7.
- Stein, Gertrude. 1922. Geography and Plays. Mineola, NY: Dover, 1999. ISBN 0-486-40874-4.
- Stein, Gertrude. 1932. Operas and Plays. Barrytown NY: Station Hill Arts, 1998. ISBN 1-886449-16-3.
- Stein, Gertrude. 1949. Last Operas and Plays. Ed. Carl van Vechten. Baltimore and London: The Johns Hopkins University Press, 1995. ISBN 0-8018-4985-3.
