= The Making of Americans =

1925 novel by Gertrude Stein

- First edition title page
- Author: Gertrude Stein
- Language: English
- Publication date: 1925
- Media type: Print

The Making of Americans: Being a History of a Family's Progress is a modernist novel by Gertrude Stein. The novel traces the genealogy, history, and psychological development of members of the fictional Hersland and Dehning families. Stein also includes frequent metafictional meditations on the process of writing the text that periodically overtake the main narrative.

== Publication history ==
Stein wrote the bulk of the novel between 1903 and 1911, and evidence from her manuscripts suggests three major periods of revision during that time. The manuscript remained mostly hidden from public view until 1924 when, at the urging of Ernest Hemingway, Ford Madox Ford agreed to publish excerpts in the transatlantic review. In 1925, the Paris-based Contact Press published a limited run of the novel consisting of 500 copies. A much-abridged edition was published by Harcourt Brace in 1934, but the full version remained out of print until Something Else Press republished it in 1966. In 1995, a new, definitive edition was published by Dalkey Archive Press with a foreword by William Gass.

== Characters ==
Stein writes, "the important matter in the history of the Dehning family is the marrying of Julia" to Alfred Hersland, and Stein describes the members of each of their families - as well as several peripheral characters with whom the families are acquainted - in insistent, painstaking detail. The book lacks chapter divisions, but it is roughly divided into sections corresponding to the lives of one generation of Herslands: Alfred, his wife Julia (née Dehning), and his siblings, Martha and David.

== Style ==
Stein employs a limited vocabulary and relies heavily on the technique of repetition. Her unusual use of the present participle is one of the most commonly noted features of the text.

== Autobiographical elements ==
The book contains many autobiographical elements. Some scholars argue that David Hersland is a fictional representation of Gertrude Stein's brother Leo. Gossols, the Western city that the Hersland family calls home, is said to be a stand-in for the Steins' hometown of Oakland, California.
