= Everybody's Autobiography =

1937 book by Gertrude Stein

- Title page for Everybody's Autobiography (1971 edition)
- Author: Gertrude Stein
- Language: English
- Genre: Memoir
- Publication date: 1937
- Publication place: United States

Everybody's Autobiography is a book by Gertrude Stein, published in 1937.

It is a continuation of her own memoirs, picking up where The Autobiography of Alice B. Toklas, published in 1933, left off. Both were written in a less experimental, more approachable style than most of her other work.

In chapter four of this book is found the famous statement "There is no there there", which refers to her disappeared childhood home in Oakland, California.
