= Paris France (novel) =

1940 memoir by Gertrude Stein

First edition (publ. Scribner's) Cover art by Francis Rose

Paris France is a memoir written by Gertrude Stein and published in 1940 on the day that Paris fell to Germany during World War II. The book blends Stein's childhood memories with a commentary on French people and culture.

== Plot summary ==
Paris France is a memoir written in a “stream of consciousness” style. It is interpreted as Gertrude Stein’s personal view of France as a country, and the French people. She observes the French eating, drinking, crossing the street, and carrying out their day in no other way that deviates from their "Frenchness." The word "French" quickly becomes a state of being or state of existence.

Throughout the novel, the idea of being French in France is communicated to the reader in a raw, confident, matter of fact way. Because of this, some critics believe the novel was not meant to be written as a completely accurate view of the French culture. Stein refers often to fashion, autonomy, logic, tradition and civilization as crucial parts of the French state of being, any straying of which would be straying from being French, regardless of actual nationality.

Stein places the state of France within the context of past wars and the possible impending war and the war’s effect on the “Frenchness” of the French, as well as the ideal/real French reaction to war. Stein nonchalantly recalls anecdotes she deems relevant to the topic at hand, each bringing reference to other anecdotal stories having a purpose and place within the progression of the novel. Stein freely follows the tangents of thoughts and life stories (or stories from others’ lives) but always returns to the driving purpose of the work, identifying the French qualities and paying homage to England and France.

== Literary style ==
Among her meditations on French character and “civilisation,” Gertrude Stein’s Paris France (1940) includes a quick dismissal of the “sur-realist crowd”:

That was really the trouble with the sur-realist crowd, they missed their moment of becoming civilized, they used their revolt, not as a private but as a public thing, they wanted publicity not civilisation, and so really they never succeeded in being peaceful and exciting.

As this quote suggests, although Stein was a prominent figure in the Paris avant-garde during the rise of Surrealism, her literary philosophy and practice diverged sharply from the movement. Unlike the Surrealists, Stein rejected the influence of Sigmund Freud, dream analysis, and the uncanny. While Surrealism relied heavily on psychic automatism, chance effects, and the subconscious mind, Stein’s experimental prose was characterized by deliberate composition and linguistic precision.

Literary scholars generally situate Stein within the context of early modernist Cubism rather than Surrealism, noting that she developed her distinct style prior to the emergence of André Breton's manifestos. Furthermore, Stein maintained an explicit distance from the Surrealist circle, focusing her personal and artistic allegiances primarily on avant-garde painters like Pablo Picasso and Henri Matisse. While her radical approach to language may have influenced certain Surrealist writers, the movement itself had no substantial impact on her work.

== Themes ==
=== Logic ===
Logic in the novel is mostly based on Stein's interpretation from her own experiences in Paris, France. She also uses points of view from her maid, and her general acquaintances. Much of France's wartime history is also used in describing her reasons behind life in Paris.

=== Becoming civilized ===
Gertrude Stein references in the book a process in order for the French people to assimilate into the French culture, or in her terms, to become "civilised". The novel parallels the life of a human to the temperament of a century. At first a century goes through its childhood years. During this time a century is hopeful and calm. Then come the turbulent adolescent years. It experiences war, and is unsure of its direction. A century then becomes civilized, and settles down.

== Relationship to Stein's personal life ==
The novel is entirely connected to Stein's personal life. She begins the novel with her earliest memories of Paris and anything French she experienced throughout her childhood in San Francisco. She lived in Paris, France her entire adult life and it is quite obvious that she is deeply connected to the city, country and entire culture. She has made several stereotypes about the French culture that may have helped aided with her obsession with France.

There are constant statements about how the French are logical and fashionable while also saying that they are civilized and everything is exciting and calm. The war is a significant part of her life in France; there are constant references to it throughout the book. At one point she refers to war 14 times in four pages. The book does not make it quite clear what time during the war she is talking about, because the book was published in 1940 and the war made official in France in 1940 but Poland was invaded in 1939. It is clear that the war had a great impact on her life, but with only a year in between the invasion of Poland and publishing of the book there is no real way to determine what parts of it she is referring to.
