= Gertrude Stein =

American author (1874–1946)

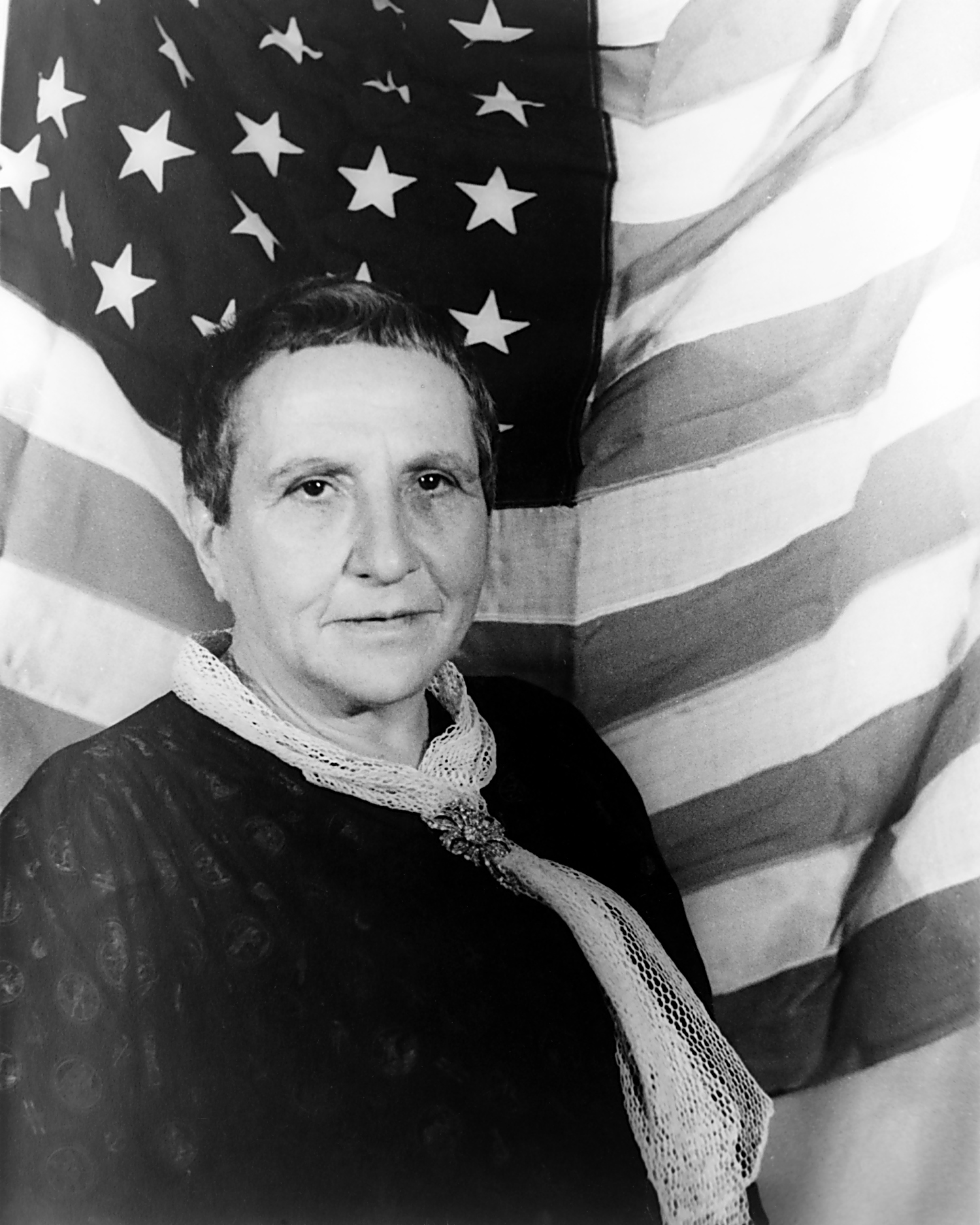
- Portrait by Carl Van Vechten, 1935
- Born: February 3, 1874; Allegheny, Pennsylvania, U.S.
- Died: July 27, 1946 (aged 72); Neuilly-sur-Seine, Provisional Government of the French Republic
- Resting place: Père Lachaise Cemetery
- Education: Radcliffe College (BA); Johns Hopkins University
- Occupations: Writer; poet; novelist; playwright; art collector
- Partner: Alice Toklas
- Writing career
- Movement: Modernist literature

Gertrude Stein (February 3, 1874 – July 27, 1946) was an American novelist, poet, playwright, and art collector. Born in Allegheny, Pennsylvania (now part of Pittsburgh), and raised in Oakland, California, Stein moved to Paris in 1903, and made France her home for the remainder of her life. She hosted a Paris salon, where the leading figures of modernism in literature and art, such as Pablo Picasso, Ernest Hemingway, F. Scott Fitzgerald, Sinclair Lewis, Ezra Pound, Sherwood Anderson and Henri Matisse, would meet.

In 1933, Stein published a quasi-memoir of her Paris years, The Autobiography of Alice B. Toklas, written in the voice of Alice B. Toklas, her life partner. The book became a literary bestseller and vaulted Stein from the relative obscurity of the cult-literature scene into the limelight of mainstream attention. Two quotes from her works have become widely known: "Rose is a rose is a rose is a rose", and "there is no there there", with the latter often taken to be a reference to her childhood home of Oakland.

Her books include Q.E.D. (1903), about a lesbian romantic affair involving several of Stein's friends; Fernhurst, a fictional story about a love triangle; Three Lives (1905–06); The Making of Americans (1902–1911); and Tender Buttons (1914).

Her activities during World War II have been the subject of analysis and commentary. As a Jew living in Nazi-occupied France, Stein may have been able to sustain her lifestyle as an art collector, and indeed to ensure her physical safety, only through the protection of the powerful Vichy government official and Nazi collaborator Bernard Faÿ. After the war ended, Stein expressed admiration for another Nazi collaborator, Vichy leader Philippe Pétain.

== Early life ==
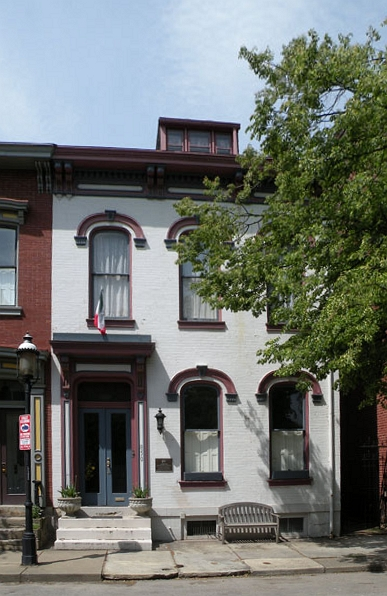
Stein's birth house in the former city of Allegheny, Pennsylvania

Stein, the last of seven children, was born on February 3, 1874, in Allegheny, Pennsylvania (which merged with Pittsburgh in 1907), to upper-middle-class Jewish parents, Daniel Stein and Amelia Stein, née Keyser. Her father was a wealthy businessman with real estate holdings. German and English were spoken in their home. Gertrude's surviving siblings, with whom she was raised, were: Michael (born in 1865), Simon (1868), Bertha (1870), and Leo (1872).

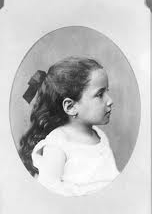
Stein at three years of age

When Stein was three years old, she and her family moved to Vienna, and then Paris. Accompanied by governesses and tutors, the Steins endeavored to imbue their children with the cultured sensibilities of European history and life. After a year-long sojourn abroad, they returned to the U.S. in 1878, settling in Oakland, California, where her father became director of San Francisco's streetcar lines, the Market Street Railway. Stein attended the First Hebrew Congregation of Oakland's Sabbath school. During their residence in Oakland, they lived for four years on a 10-acre lot, experiencing California in ways that Stein would remember throughout her life. She would take frequent excursions with her brother Leo, with whom she developed a close relationship. Though Stein found formal schooling in Oakland unstimulating, she often immersed herself in the writings of Shakespeare, Wordsworth, Scott, Burns, Smollett, Fielding, and others.

When Stein was 14 years old, their mother died. Three years later, they lost their father, as well. Stein's eldest brother, Michael, age 26, then took over the family business holdings, moved his four siblings to San Francisco, where he had become a director of the Market Street Cable Railway Company. In 1892, he arranged for Gertrude and their sister, Bertha, to live with their mother's family in Baltimore.

There, Gertrude lived with her uncle David Bachrach, who, in 1877, had married Fanny Keyser. In Baltimore, Stein also got to know Claribel and Etta Cone, who held Saturday evening salons that she would later emulate in Paris. The Cones shared an appreciation for art and conversation about it and modeled a domestic division of labor that Stein would replicate in her relationship with Alice B. Toklas.

== Education ==
=== Radcliffe ===
Stein attended Radcliffe College, then an annex of Harvard University, from 1893 to 1897 and was a student of psychologist William James. With James's supervision, Stein and another student, Leon Mendez Solomons, performed experiments on normal motor automatism, a phenomenon hypothesized to occur in people when their attention is divided between two simultaneous intelligent activities such as writing and speaking.

These experiments yielded examples of writing that appeared to represent "stream of consciousness", a psychological theory often attributed to James and the style of modernist authors Virginia Woolf and James Joyce. In 1934, behavioral psychologist B. F. Skinner interpreted Stein's difficult poem Tender Buttons as an example of normal motor automatism. In a letter Stein wrote during the 1930s, she explained that she never accepted the theory of automatic writing: "[T]here can be automatic movements, but not automatic writing. Writing for the normal person is too complicated an activity to be indulged in automatically." She did publish an article in a psychological journal on "spontaneous automatic writing" while at Radcliffe, but "the unconscious and the intuition (even when James himself wrote about them) never concerned her".

At Radcliffe, she began a lifelong friendship with Mabel Foote Weeks, whose correspondence traces much of the progression of Stein's life. In 1897, Stein spent the summer in Woods Hole, Massachusetts, studying embryology at the Marine Biological Laboratory. She received her A.B. (Bachelor of Arts) magna cum laude from Radcliffe in 1898.

=== Johns Hopkins School of Medicine ===
William James, who had become a committed mentor to Stein at Radcliffe, recognizing her intellectual potential, and declaring her his "most brilliant woman student", encouraged Stein to enroll in medical school. Although Stein professed no interest in either the theory or practice of medicine, she enrolled at Johns Hopkins School of Medicine in 1897. In her fourth year, Stein failed an important course, lost interest, and left. Ultimately, medical school had bored her, and she had spent many of her evenings not applying herself to her studies, but taking long walks and attending the opera.

Stein's tenure at Johns Hopkins was marked by challenges and stress. Men dominated the medical field, and the inclusion of women in the profession was not unreservedly or unanimously welcomed. Writing of this period in her life (in Things As They Are, 1903) Stein often revealed herself as a depressed young woman dealing with a paternalistic culture, struggling to find her own identity, which she realized could not conform to the conventional female role. Her uncorseted physical appearance and eccentric mode of dress aroused comment and she was described as "Big and floppy and sandaled and not caring a damn." According to Linda Wagner-Martin, Stein's "controversial stance on women's medicine caused problems with the male faculty" and contributed to her decision to leave without finishing her degree.

Asked to give a lecture to a group of Baltimore women in 1899, Stein gave a controversial speech titled "The Value of College Education for Women", undoubtedly designed to provoke the largely middle-class audience. In the lecture Stein maintained:

average middle class woman [supported by] some male relative, a husband or father or brother,...[is] not worth her keep economically considered. [This economic dependence caused her to become] oversexed...adapting herself to the abnormal sex desire of the male...and becoming a creature that should have been first a human being and then a woman into one that is a woman first and always.

—

While a student at Johns Hopkins and purportedly still naïve about sexual matters, Stein experienced an awakening of her latent sexuality. Sometime in 1899 or 1900, she became infatuated with Mary Bookstaver who was involved in a relationship with a medical student, Mabel Haynes. Witnessing the relationship between the two women served for Stein as her "erotic awakening". The unhappy love triangle demoralized Stein, arguably contributing to her decision to abandon her medical studies. In 1902, Stein's brother Leo Stein left for London, and Gertrude followed. The following year the two relocated to Paris, where Leo hoped to pursue an art career.

== Art collection ==
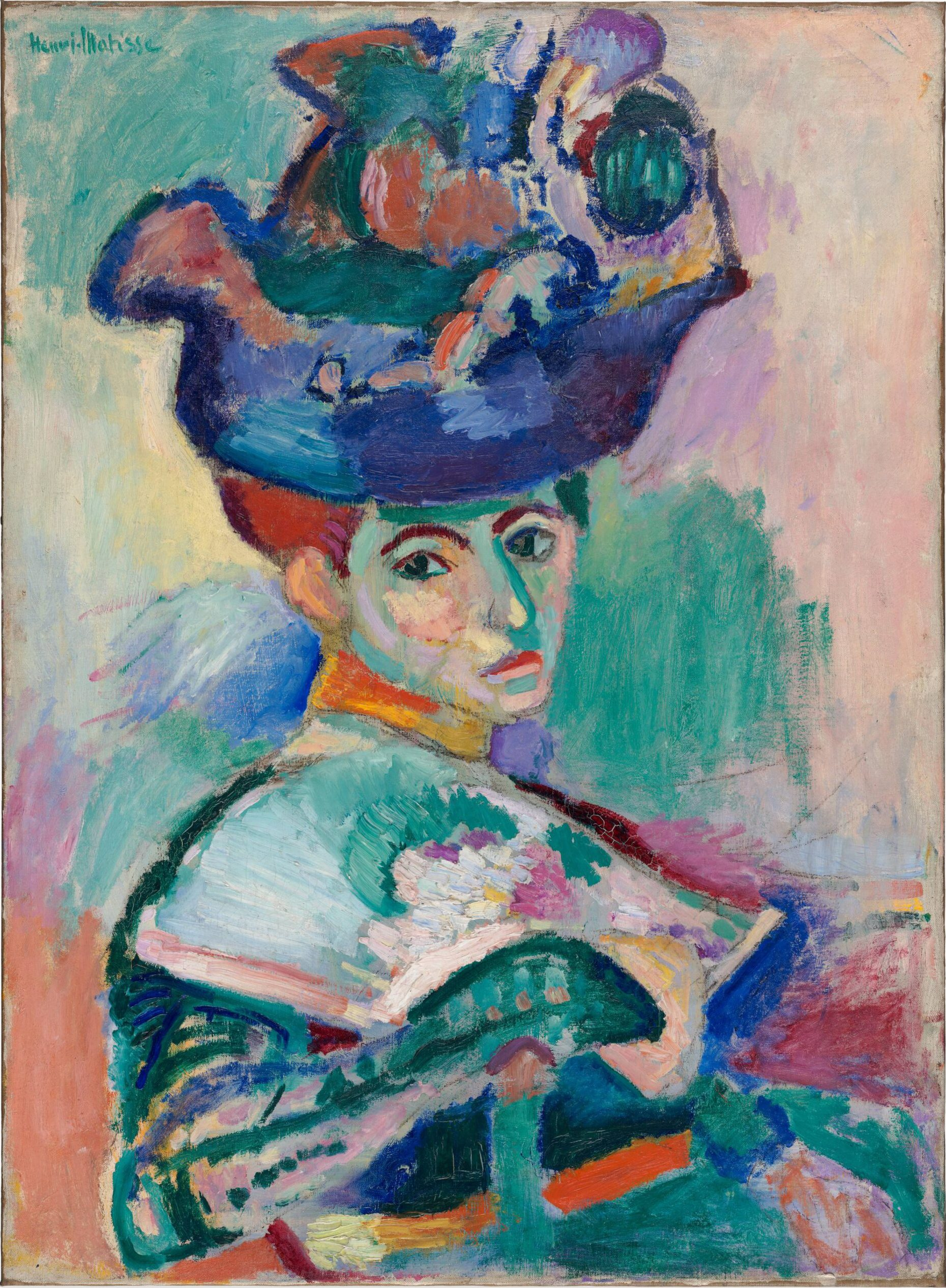
Gertrude and Leo Stein bought Henri Matisse's, Woman with a Hat, 1905, a portrait of the artist's wife, Amelia, now in the San Francisco Museum of Modern Art

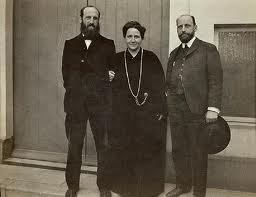
Leo, Gertrude, and Michael Stein

From 1903 until 1914, when they dissolved their common household, Gertrude and her brother Leo shared living quarters near the Luxembourg Gardens on the Left Bank of Paris in a two-story apartment (with the adjacent studio) located on the interior courtyard at 27 rue de Fleurus, 6th arrondissement. Here they accumulated the works of art that formed a collection that became renowned for its prescience and historical importance.

The gallery space was furnished with imposing Renaissance-era furniture from Florence, Italy. The paintings lined the walls in tiers trailing many feet to the ceiling. Initially illuminated by gaslight, the artwork was later lit by electric light shortly prior to World War I.

Leo Stein cultivated important art world connections, enabling the Stein holdings to grow over time. The art historian and collector Bernard Berenson hosted Gertrude and Leo in his English country house in 1902, facilitating their introduction to Paul Cézanne and the dealer Ambroise Vollard. Vollard was heavily involved in the Cézanne art market, and he was the first important contact in the Paris art world for both Leo and Gertrude.

The joint collection of Gertrude and Leo Stein began in late 1904 when Michael Stein announced that their trust account had accumulated a balance of 8,000 francs. They spent this at Vollard's Gallery, buying Gauguin's Sunflowers and Three Tahitians, Cézanne's Bathers, and two Renoirs.

Stein in her Paris studio, with a portrait of her by Pablo Picasso, and other modern art paintings hanging on the wall (before 1910)

The art collection increased and the walls at Rue de Fleurus were rearranged continually to make way for new acquisitions. In "the first half of 1905" the Steins acquired Cézanne's Portrait of Mme Cézanne and Delacroix's Perseus and Andromeda. Shortly after the opening of the Salon d'Automne of 1905 (on October 18, 1905), the Steins acquired Matisse's Woman with a Hat and Picasso's Young Girl with a Flower Basket. In 1906, Picasso completed Portrait of Gertrude Stein, which remained in her collection until her death.

Henry McBride (art critic for the New York Sun) did much for Stein's reputation in the United States, publicizing her art acquisitions and her importance as a cultural figure. Of the art collection at 27 Rue de Fleurus, McBride commented: "[I]n proportion to its size and quality... [it is] just about the most potent of any that I have ever heard of in history." McBride also observed that Gertrude "collected geniuses rather than masterpieces. She recognized them a long way off."

By early 1906, Leo and Gertrude Stein's studio had many paintings by Henri Manguin, Pierre Bonnard, Pablo Picasso, Paul Cézanne, Pierre-Auguste Renoir, Honoré Daumier, Henri Matisse, and Henri de Toulouse-Lautrec. Their collection was representative of two famous art exhibitions that took place during their residence together in Paris, and to which they contributed, either by lending their art or by patronizing the featured artists. The Steins' elder brother, Michael, and sister-in-law Sarah (Sally) acquired a large number of Henri Matisse paintings; Gertrude's friends from Baltimore, Claribel and Etta Cone, collected similarly, eventually donating their art collection, virtually intact, to the Baltimore Museum of Art.

While numerous artists visited the Stein salon, many of these artists were not represented among the paintings on the walls at 27 Rue de Fleurus. Where Renoir, Cézanne, Matisse, and Picasso's works dominated Leo and Gertrude's collection, the collection of Michael and Sarah Stein emphasized Matisse. In April 1914 Leo relocated to Settignano, Italy, near Florence, and the art collection was divided. The division of the Steins' art collection was described in a letter by Leo:

The Cézanne apples have a unique importance to me that nothing can replace. The Picasso landscape is not important in any such sense. We are, as it seems to me on the whole, both so well off now that we needn't repine. The Cézannes had to be divided. I am willing to leave you the Picasso oeuvre, as you left me the Renoir, and you can have everything except that. I want to keep the few drawings that I have. This leaves no string for me, it is financially equable either way for estimates are only rough & ready methods, & I'm afraid you'll have to look upon the loss of the apples as an act of God. I have been anxious above all things that each should have in reason all that he wanted, and just as I was glad that Renoir was sufficiently indifferent to you so that you were ready to give them up, so I am glad that Pablo is sufficiently indifferent to me that I am willing to let you have all you want of it.

Leo departed with sixteen Renoirs and, relinquishing the Picassos and most of Matisse to his sister, took only a portrait sketch Picasso had done of him. He remained dedicated to Cézanne, nonetheless, leaving all the artist's works with his sister, taking with him only a Cézanne painting of "5 apples". The split between brother and sister was acrimonious. Stein did not see Leo Stein again until after World War I, and then through only a brief greeting on the street in Paris. After this accidental encounter, they never saw or spoke to each other again. The Steins' holdings were dispersed eventually by various methods and for various reasons.

After her and Leo's households separated in 1914, Stein continued to collect examples of Picasso's art, which had turned to Cubism, a style Leo did not appreciate. At her death, Gertrude's remaining collection emphasized the artwork of Picasso and Juan Gris, most of her other pictures having been sold.

Gertrude Stein's personality has dominated the provenance of the Stein art legacy. It was, however, her brother Leo who was the astute art appraiser. Alfred Barr Jr., the founding director of New York's Museum of Modern Art, said that between the years of 1905 and 1907, "[Leo] was possibly the most discerning connoisseur and collector of 20th-century painting in the world." After the artworks were divided between the two Stein siblings, it was Gertrude who moved on to champion the works of what proved to be lesser talents in the 1930s. She concentrated on the work of Juan Gris, André Masson, and Sir Francis Rose. In 1932, Stein asserted: "Painting now after its great period has come back to be a minor art."

In 1945, in a preface for the first exhibition of Spanish painter Francisco Riba Rovira (who painted a portrait of her), Stein wrote:

I explained that for me, all modern painting is based on what Cézanne nearly made, instead of basing itself on what he almost managed to make. When he could not make a thing, he hijacked it and left it. He insisted on showing his incapacity: he spread his lack of success: showing what he could not do, became an obsession for him. People influenced by him were also obsessed with the things which they could not reach and they began the system of camouflage. It was natural to do so, even inevitable: that soon became an art, in peace and war, and Matisse concealed and insisted at the same time that Cézanne could not realize, and Picasso concealed, played, and tormented all these things. The only one who wanted to insist on this problem was Juan Gris. He persisted by deepening the things which Cézanne wanted to do, but it was too hard a task for him: it killed him. And now here we are, I find a young painter who does not follow the tendency to play with what Cézanne could not do, but who attacks any right the things which he tried to make, to create the objects which have to exist, for, and in themselves, and not in relation.

== 27 rue de Fleurus: The Stein salon ==
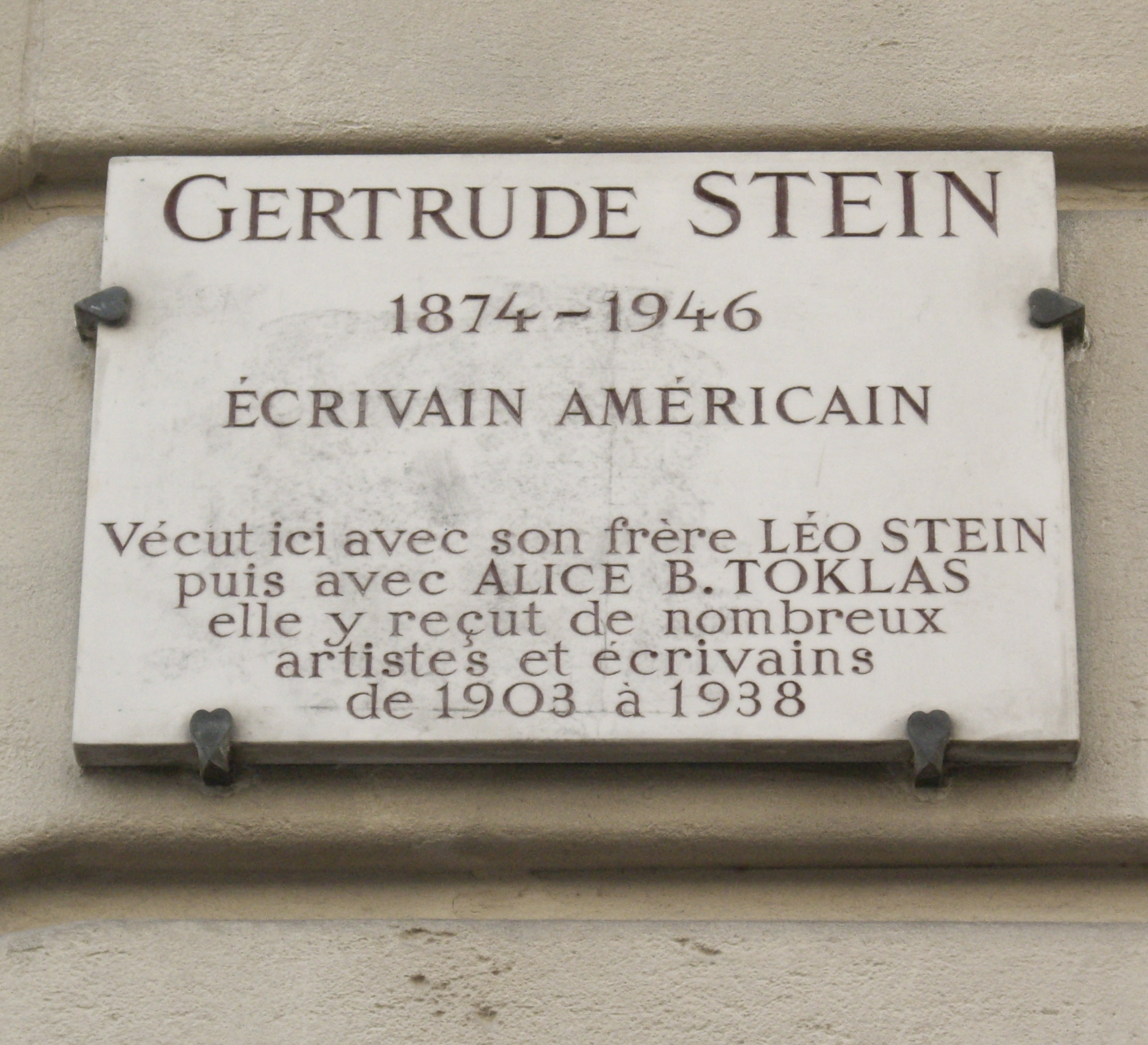
Plaque at 27 rue de Fleurus

The gatherings in the Stein home "brought together confluences of talent and thinking that would help define modernism in literature and art". Dedicated attendees included Pablo Picasso, Ernest Hemingway, F. Scott Fitzgerald, Sinclair Lewis, Ezra Pound, Gavin Williamson, Thornton Wilder, Sherwood Anderson, Francis Cyril Rose, Bob Brown, René Crevel, Élisabeth de Gramont, Francis Picabia, Claribel Cone, Mildred Aldrich, Jane Peterson, Carl Van Vechten, Henri Matisse and Georges Braque. Saturday evenings had been set as the fixed day and time for formal congregation so Stein could work at her writing uninterrupted by impromptu visitors.

It was Stein's partner Alice who became the de facto hostess for the wives and girlfriends of the artists in attendance, who met in a separate room. From "Alice Entertained the Wives" (The New York Times, 1977): " 'I am a person acted upon, not a person who acts,' Alice told one of Gertrude's biographers (...) When guests showed up, Alice was called upon to entertain their wives. The ladies were, of course, 'second‐class citizens' "

Gertrude attributed the beginnings of the Saturday evening salons to Matisse, as people began visiting to see his paintings and those of Cézanne: "Matisse brought people, everybody brought somebody, and they came at any time and it began to be a nuisance, and it was in this way that Saturday evenings began."

Among Picasso's acquaintances who frequented the Saturday evenings were: Fernande Olivier (an artists' model in a relationship with Picasso), Georges Braque (artist), André Derain (artist), Max Jacob (poet), Guillaume Apollinaire (poet and art critic), Marie Laurencin (artist, in a relationship with Apollinaire), Henri Rousseau (painter), and Joseph Stella (painter).

Hemingway frequented Stein's salon, but the two had an uneven relationship. They began as close friends, with Hemingway admiring Stein as a mentor, but they later grew apart, especially after Stein called Hemingway "yellow" in The Autobiography of Alice B. Toklas. Upon the birth of his son, Hemingway asked Stein to be the godmother of his child. While Stein has been credited with inventing the term "Lost Generation" for those whose defining moment in time and coming of age had been World War I and its aftermath, there are at least three versions of the story that led to the phrase, two by Hemingway and one by Stein.

During the summer of 1931, Stein advised the young composer and writer Paul Bowles to go to Tangier, where she and Alice had vacationed.

In 1938, Stein and Toklas moved from the rue de Fleurus to 5 rue Christine in the 6th arrondissement. For much of the war they sheltered in a house they had rented for several years in the hamlet of Bilignin in the commune of Belley (Ain), which was initially outside the area of direct German occupation in the Zone libre.

== Literary style ==
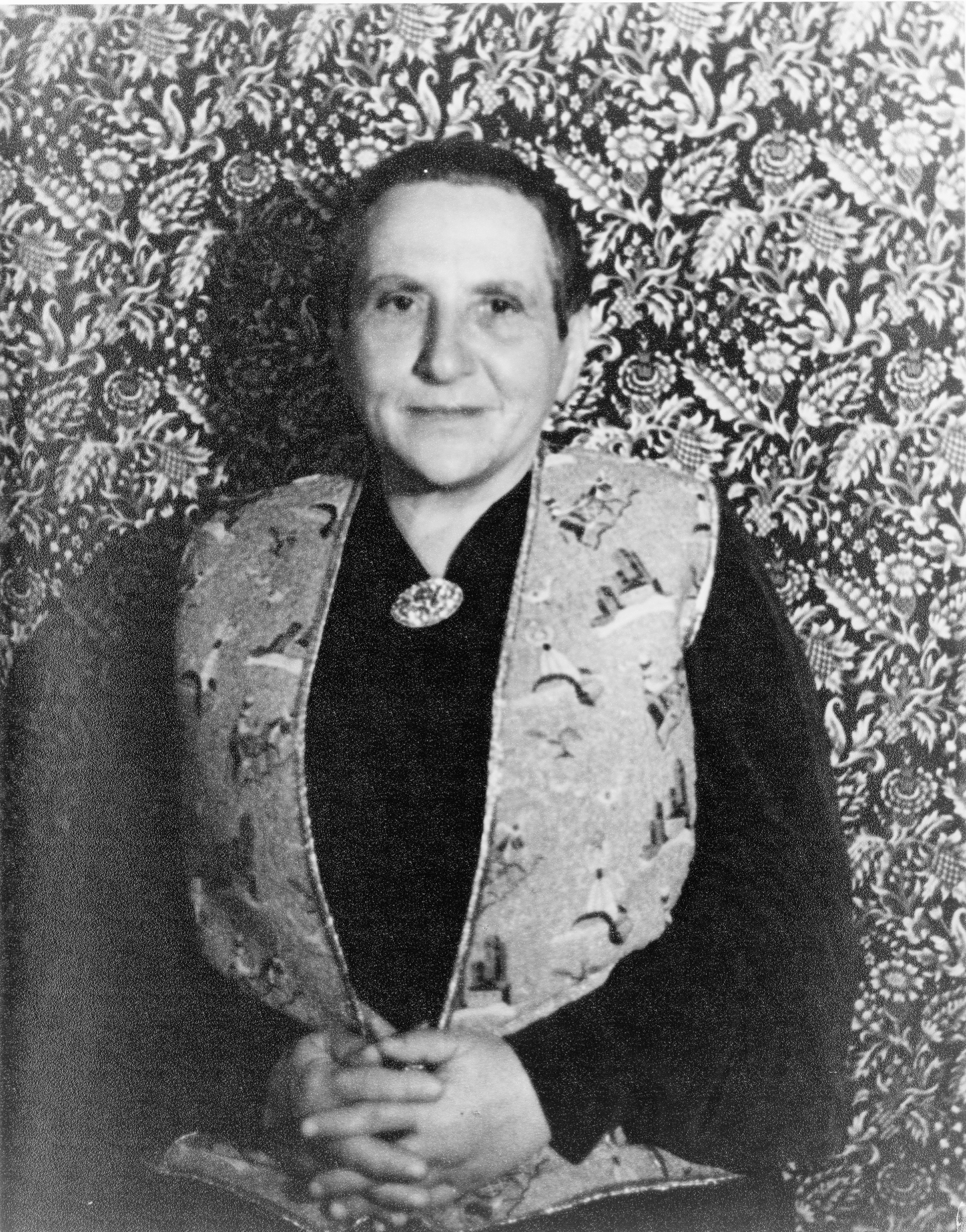
Carl Van Vechten, Portrait of Gertrude Stein, 1934

Stein's writing can be placed in three categories: "hermetic" works best illustrated by The Making of Americans: The Hersland Family; popularized writing such as The Autobiography of Alice B. Toklas; and speech writing and more accessible autobiographical writing of later years, of which Brewsie and Willie is a good example. Her works include novels, plays, stories, libretti, and poems written in a highly idiosyncratic, playful, repetitive, and humorous style. Typical quotes are: "Rose is a rose is a rose is a rose"; "Out of kindness comes redness and out of rudeness comes rapid same question, out of an eye comes research, out of selection comes painful cattle"; about her childhood home in Oakland, "There is no there there"; and "The change of color is likely and a difference a very little difference is prepared. Sugar is not a vegetable."

A reader wrote to Stein in 1933 asking her to explain the rose quotation received a reply from Toklas as her secretary: "The device rose is a rose is a rose is a rose means just that. Miss Stein is unfortunately too busy herself to be able to tell you herself, but trusts that you will eventually come to understand that each and every word that she writes means exactly what she says, for she says very exactly what she means, and really nothing more, but, of course, nothing less."

These stream-of-consciousness experiments, rhythmical essays or "portraits", were designed to evoke "the excitingness of pure being" and can be seen as literature's answer to visual art styles and forms such as Cubism, plasticity, and collage. Many of the experimental works, such as Tender Buttons, have since been interpreted by critics as a feminist reworking of patriarchal language. These works were well received by avant-garde critics but did not initially achieve mainstream success. Despite Stein's work on "automatic writing" with William James, she did not see her work as automatic, but as an 'excess of consciousness'.

Though Stein collected cubist paintings, especially those of Picasso, the largest visual arts influence on her literary work is that of Cézanne. Particularly, he influenced her idea of equality, distinguished from universality: "the whole field of the canvas is important." Rather than a figure/ground relationship, "Stein in her work with words used the entire text as a field in which every element mattered as much as any other." It is a subjective relationship that includes multiple viewpoints. Stein explained: "[T]he important thing... is that you must have deep down as the deepest thing in you a sense of equality."

Her use of repetition is ascribed to her search for descriptions of the "bottom nature" of her characters, such as in The Making of Americans where the narrator is described through the repetition of narrative phrases such as "As I was saying" and "There will be now a history of her." Stein used many Anglo-Saxon words and avoided words with "too much association". Social judgment is absent in her writing, so the reader is given the power to decide how to think and feel about the writing. Anxiety, fear, and anger are also absent, and her work is harmonic and integrative. Stein's work was included in the second issue of 0 to 9 magazine, a journal which explored language and meaning-making during the 1960s avant garde movement.

Stein predominantly used the present progressive tense, creating a continuous presence in her work, which Grahn argues is a consequence of the previous principles, especially commonality and centeredness. Grahn describes "play" as the granting of autonomy and agency to the readers or audience: "rather than the emotional manipulation that is a characteristic of linear writing, Stein uses play." In addition, Stein's work is funny, and multilayered, allowing a variety of interpretations and engagements. Lastly, Grahn argues that one must "insterstand... engage with the work, to mix with it in an active engagement, rather than 'figuring it out.' Figure it in." In 1932, using an accessible style to appeal to a wider audience, she wrote The Autobiography of Alice B. Toklas; the book would become her first best-seller. Despite the title, it was actually Stein's autobiography. The style was quite similar to that of The Alice B. Toklas Cookbook, which was written by Toklas. Many critics speculated that Toklas actually had written The Autobiography of Alice B. Toklas, despite Toklas repeatedly denying authorship.

Several of Stein's writings have been set to music by composers, including Virgil Thomson's operas Four Saints in Three Acts and The Mother of Us All, and James Tenney's setting of Rose is a rose is a rose is a rose as a canon dedicated to Philip Corner, beginning with "a" on an upbeat and continuing so that each repetition shuffles the words, e.g. "a/rose is a rose/is a rose is/a rose is a/rose."

== Literary career ==
Pablo Picasso, Portrait of Gertrude Stein, 1906, Metropolitan Museum of Art, New York. When someone commented that Stein didn't look like her portrait, Picasso replied, "She will." Stein wrote "If I Told Him: A Completed Portrait of Picasso" (1923) in response to the painting.

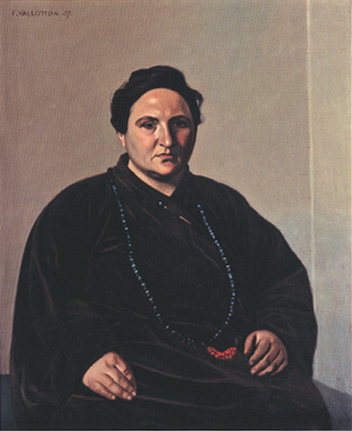
Félix Vallotton, Portrait of Gertrude Stein, 1907

While living in Paris, Stein began submitting her writing for publication. Her earliest writings were mainly retellings of her college experiences. Her first critically acclaimed publication was Three Lives. In 1911, Mildred Aldrich introduced Stein to Mabel Dodge Luhan and they began a short-lived but fruitful friendship during which the wealthy Mabel Dodge promoted Gertrude's legend in the United States.

Mabel was enthusiastic about Stein's sprawling publication The Makings of Americans and, at a time when Stein had much difficulty selling her writing to publishers, privately published 300 copies of Portrait of Mabel Dodge at Villa Curonia. Dodge was also involved in the publicity and planning of the 69th Regiment Armory Show in 1913, "the first avant-garde art exhibition in the US".

In addition, she wrote the first critical analysis of Stein's writing to appear in the US, in "Speculations, or Post-Impressionists in Prose", published in a special March 1913 publication of Arts and Decoration. Foreshadowing Stein's later critical reception, Dodge wrote in "Speculations":

In Gertrude Stein's writing every word lives and, apart from concept, it is so exquisitely rhythmical and cadenced that if we read it aloud and receive it as pure sound, it is like a kind of sensuous music. Just as one may stop, for once, in a way, before a canvas of Picasso, and, letting one's reason sleep for an instant, may exclaim: "It is a fine pattern!" so, listening to Gertrude Stein's words and forgetting to try to understand what they mean, one submits to their gradual charm.

Stein and Carl Van Vechten, the noted critic and photographer, became acquainted in Paris in 1913. The two became lifelong friends, devising pet names for each other: Van Vechten was "Papa Woojums", and Stein, "Baby Woojums". Van Vechten served as an enthusiastic champion of Stein's literary work in the United States, in effect becoming her US agent.

=== United States (1934–1935) ===
In October 1934, Stein arrived in the US after a 30-year absence. Disembarking from the ocean liner in New York, she encountered a throng of reporters. Front-page articles on Stein appeared in almost every New York City newspaper. As she rode through Manhattan to her hotel, she was able to get a sense of the publicity that would hallmark her US tour. An electric sign in Times Square announced to all that "Gertrude Stein Has Arrived." Her six-month tour of the country encompassed 191 days of travel, criss-crossing 23 states and visiting 37 cities. Among other sites, Stein visited Civil War battlefields, toured Chicago with homicide detectives, saw a football game in New Haven, dined in New Orleans, visited Scott Fitzergald and Zelda Sayre in Baltimore, and returned to her childhood home in Oakland. In Texas, she was interviewed by a student reporter, Walter Cronkite.

Stein's tour was partly to give public lectures, and she prepared each individually; the audiences were limited to five hundred attendees. She spoke, reading from notes, and provided for an audience question and answer period at the end of her presentation.

Stein's effectiveness as a lecture speaker received varying evaluations. At the time, some maintained that "Stein's audiences by and large did not understand her lectures." Some of those in the psychiatric community weighed in, judging that Stein suffered from a speech disorder, palilalia, which caused her "to stutter over words and phrases". The predominant feeling, however, was that Stein was a compelling presence, a fascinating personality who could hold listeners with the "musicality of her language".

In Washington, D.C. Stein was invited to have tea with the President's wife, Eleanor Roosevelt. In Beverly Hills, California, she visited actor and filmmaker Charlie Chaplin, who reportedly discussed the future of cinema with her. Stein left the US in May 1935, a newly minted US celebrity with a commitment from Random House, who had agreed to become the US publisher for all of her future works. The Chicago Daily Tribune wrote after Stein's return to Paris: "No writer in years has been so widely discussed, so much caricatured, so passionately championed."

=== Books ===
==== Q.E.D. ====
Stein completed Q.E.D., her first novel, on October 24, 1903. One of the earliest coming out stories, it is about a romantic affair involving Stein and her friends Mabel Haynes, Grace Lounsbury and Mary Bookstaver, and occurred between 1897 and 1901 while she was studying at Johns Hopkins in Baltimore.

==== Fernhurst (1904) ====
In 1904, Stein began Fernhurst, a fictional account of a scandalous three-person romantic affair involving a dean (M. Carey Thomas), a faculty member from Bryn Mawr College (Mary Gwinn) and a Harvard graduate (Alfred Hodder). Mellow asserts that Fernhurst "is a decidedly minor and awkward piece of writing". It includes some commentary that Gertrude mentioned in her autobiography when she discussed the "fateful twenty-ninth year" during which:

All the forces that have been engaged through the years of childhood, adolescence and youth in confused and ferocious combat range themselves in ordered ranks (and during which) the straight and narrow gateway of maturity, and life which was all uproar and confusion narrows down to form and purpose, and we exchange a great dim possibility for a small hard reality. Also in our American life where there is no coercion in custom and it is our right to change our vocation so often as we have desire and opportunity, it is a common experience that our youth extends through the whole first twenty-nine years of our life and it is not till we reach thirty that we find at last that vocation for which we feel ourselves fit and to which we willingly devote continued labor.

Mellow observes that, in 1904, 30-year-old Gertrude "had evidently determined that the 'small hard reality' of her life would be writing".

==== Three Lives (1905–1906) ====
Stein attributed the inception of Three Lives to the inspiration she received from a portrait Cézanne had painted of his wife and which was in the Stein collection. She credited this as a revelatory moment in the evolution of her writing style. Stein described:

that the stylistic method of (Three Lives) had been influenced by the Cézanne portrait under which she sat writing. The portrait of Madame Cézanne is one of the monumental examples of the artist's method, each exacting, carefully negotiated plane—from the suave reds of the armchair and the gray blues of the sitter's jacket to the vaguely figured wallpaper of the background—having been structured into existence, seeming to fix the subject for all eternity. So it was with Gertrude's repetitive sentences, each one building up, phrase by phrase, the substance of her characters.

She began Three Lives during the spring of 1905 and finished it the following year.

==== The Making of Americans (1902–1911) ====
Gertrude Stein stated the date for her writing of The Making of Americans was 1906–1908. Her biographer has uncovered evidence that it actually began in 1902 and did not end until 1911. Stein compared her work to James Joyce's Ulysses and to Marcel Proust's In Search of Lost Time. Her critics were less enthusiastic about it. Stein wrote the bulk of the novel between 1903 and 1911, and evidence from her manuscripts suggests three major periods of revision during that time. The manuscript remained mostly hidden from public view until 1924 when, at the urging of Ernest Hemingway, Ford Madox Ford agreed to publish excerpts in the Transatlantic Review. In 1925, the Paris-based Contact Press published a limited run of the novel consisting of 500 copies. A much-abridged edition was published by Harcourt Brace in 1934, but the full version remained out of print until Something Else Press republished it in 1966. In 1995, a new, definitive edition was published by Dalkey Archive Press with a foreword by William Gass.

Gertrude's Matisse and Picasso descriptive essays appeared in Alfred Stieglitz's August 1912 edition of Camera Work, a special edition devoted to Picasso and Matisse, and represented her first publication. Of this publication, Gertrude said, "[h]e was the first one that ever printed anything that I had done. And you can imagine what that meant to me or to any one."

==== Word Portraits (1908–1913) ====
Stein's descriptive essays apparently began with her essay of Alice B. Toklas, "a little prose vignette, a kind of happy inspiration that had detached itself from the torrential prose of The Making of Americans". Stein's early efforts at word portraits are catalogued by Mellow and under individual's names in Kellner, 1988. Matisse and Picasso were subjects of early essays, later collected and published in Geography and Plays and Portraits and Prayers.

Her subjects included several ultimately famous personages, and her subjects provided a description of what she observed in her Saturday salons at 27 Rue de Fleurus: "Ada" (Alice B. Toklas), "Two Women" (The Cone sisters, Claribel Cone and Etta Cone), Miss Furr and Miss Skeene (Ethel Mars and Maud Hunt Squire), "Men" (Hutchins Hapgood, Peter David Edstrom, Maurice Sterne), "Matisse" (1909, Henri Matisse), "Picasso" (1909, Pablo Picasso), "Portrait of Mabel Dodge at the Villa Curonia" (1911, Mabel Dodge Luhan), and "Guillaume Apollinaire" (1913).

==== Tender Buttons (1912) ====
Tender Buttons is the best known of Stein's "hermetic" works. It is a small book separated into three sections—"Food", "Objects" and "Rooms", each containing prose under subtitles. Its publication in 1914 caused a great dispute between Mabel Dodge Luhan and Stein, because Mabel had been working to have it published by another publisher. Mabel wrote at length about what she viewed as the bad choice of publishing it with the press Gertrude selected. Evans wrote to Gertrude:

Claire Marie Press... is absolutely third rate, & in bad odor here, being called for the most part 'decadent" and Broadwayish and that sort of thing... I think it would be a pity to publish with [Claire Marie Press] if it will emphasize the idea in the opinion of the public, that there is something degenerate & effete & decadent about the whole of the cubist movement which they all connect you with, because, hang it all, as long as they don't understand a thing they think all sorts of things. My feeling in this is quite strong.

Stein ignored Mabel's exhortations and published 1,000 copies of the book in 1914. An antiquarian copy was valued at over $1,200 in 2007. It is currently in print, and was re-released as Tender Buttons: The Corrected Centennial Edition by City Lights Publishers in March 2014.

In an interview with Robert Bartlett Haas in "A Transatlantic Interview – 1946", Stein insisted that this work was completely "realistic" in the tradition of Gustave Flaubert, stating the following: "I used to take objects on a table, like a tumbler or any kind of object and try to get the picture of it clear and separate in my mind and create a word relationship between the word and the things seen." Commentators have indicated that what she meant was that the reference of objects remained central to her work, although the representation of them had not. Scholar Marjorie Perloff had said of Stein that "[u]nlike her contemporaries (Eliot, Pound, Moore), she does not give us an image, however fractured, of a carafe on a table; rather, she forces us to reconsider how language actually constructs the world we know."

==== The Autobiography of Alice B. Toklas (1933) ====
The publication of The Autobiography of Alice B. Toklas lifted Gertrude Stein from literary obscurity to almost immediate celebrity in the United States. Although popular with the US public, Stein received considerable backlash from individuals portrayed in her book. Eugene Jolas, editor of the avant-garde journal Transition, published a pamphlet titled Testimony against Gertrude Stein in which artists such as Henri Matisse and Georges Braque expressed their objections to Stein's portrayal of the Parisian community of artists and intellectuals. Braque, in his response, criticized, "she had entirely misunderstood cubism which she sees simply in terms of personalities".

==== Four in America (1947) ====
Published posthumously by Yale University Press in 1947, with an introduction by Thornton Wilder, Four in America creates alternative biographies of Ulysses S. Grant as a religious leader, Wilbur Wright as a painter, George Washington as a novelist, and Henry James as a military general.

== Alice B. Toklas ==
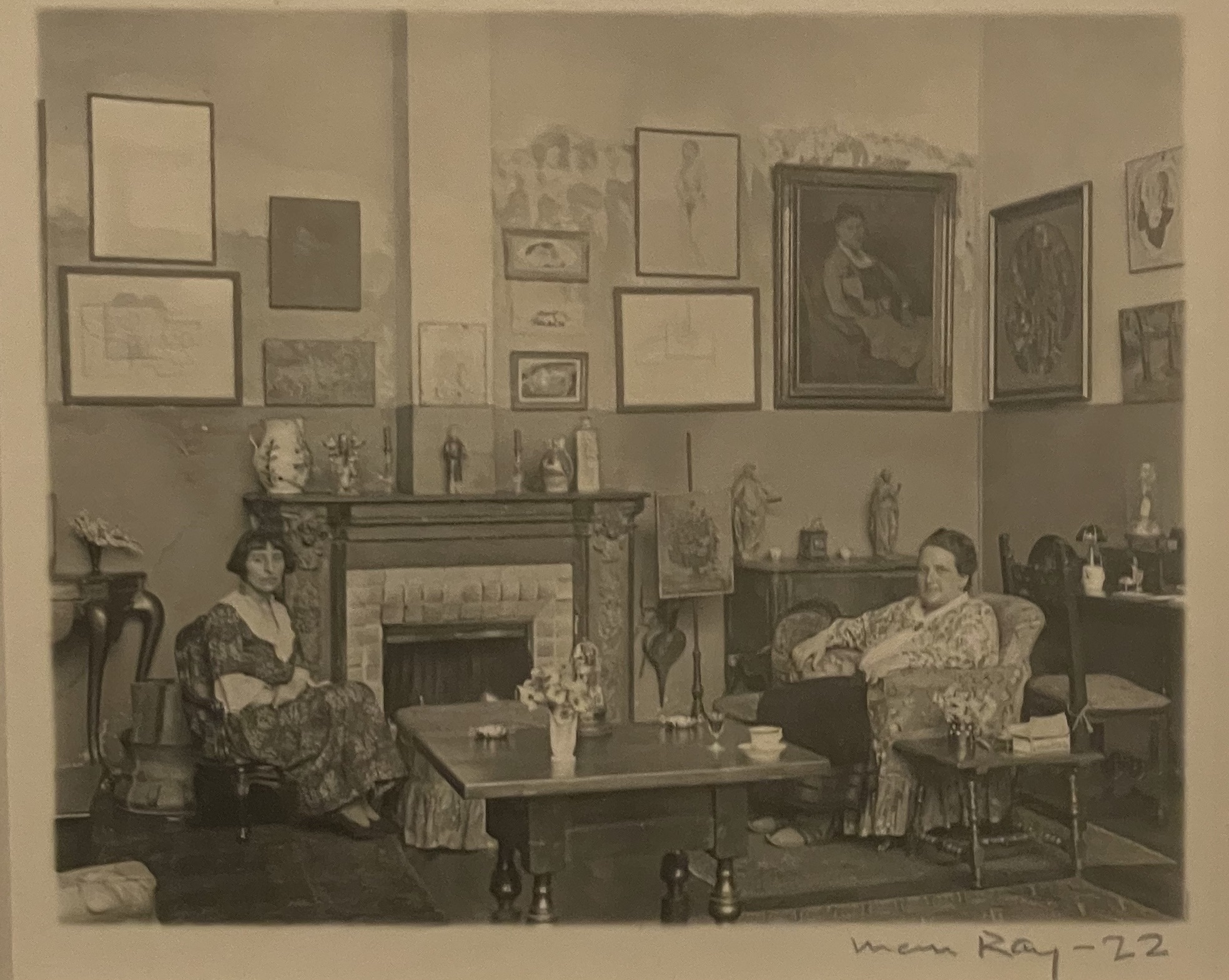
Alice B. Toklas and Gertrude Stein (1922) by Man Ray

Stein met her life partner Alice B. Toklas on September 8, 1907, on Toklas's first day in Paris, at Sarah and Michael Stein's apartment. On meeting Stein, Toklas wrote:

She was a golden brown presence, burned by the Tuscan sun and with a golden glint in her warm brown hair. She was dressed in a warm brown corduroy suit. She wore a large round coral brooch and when she talked, very little, or laughed, a good deal, I thought her voice came from this brooch. It was unlike anyone else's voice—deep, full, velvety, like a great contralto's, like two voices.

Soon thereafter, Stein introduced Toklas to Pablo Picasso at his Bateau-Lavoir studio, where he was at work on Les Demoiselles d'Avignon.

In 1908, they summered in Fiesole, Italy, Toklas staying with Harriet Lane Levy, the companion of her trip from the United States, and her housemate until Alice moved in with Stein and Leo in 1910. That summer, Stein stayed with Michael and Sarah Stein, their son Allan, and Leo in a nearby villa. Gertrude and Alice's summer of 1908 is memorialized in images of the two of them in Venice, at the piazza in front of Saint Mark's.

Toklas arrived in 1907 with Harriet Levy, with Toklas maintaining living arrangements with Levy until she moved to 27 Rue de Fleurus in 1910. In an essay written at the time, Stein humorously discussed the complex efforts, involving much letter-writing and Victorian niceties, to extricate Levy from Toklas's living arrangements. In "Harriet", Stein considers Levy's nonexistent plans for the summer, following her nonexistent plans for the winter:

She said she did not have any plans for the summer. No one was interested in this thing in whether she had any plans for the summer. That is not the complete history of this thing, some were interested in this thing in her not having any plans for the summer... Some who were not interested in her not having made plans for the summer were interested in her not having made plans for the following winter. She had not made plans for the summer and she had not made plans for the following winter... There was then coming to be the end of the summer and she was then not answering anything when any one asked her what were her plans for the winter.

During the early summer of 1914, Stein bought three paintings by Juan Gris: Roses, Glass and Bottle, and Book and Glasses. Soon after she purchased them from Daniel-Henry Kahnweiler's gallery, the Great War began, Kahnweiler's stock was confiscated and he was not allowed to return to Paris. Gris, who before the war had entered a binding contract with Kahnweiler for his output, was left without income. Stein attempted to enter an ancillary arrangement in which she would forward Gris living expenses in exchange for future pictures. Stein and Toklas had plans to visit England to sign a contract for the publication of Three Lives, to spend a few weeks there, and then journey to Spain. They left Paris on July 6, 1914, and returned on October 17. When Britain declared war on Germany, Stein and Toklas were visiting Alfred North Whitehead in England. After a supposed three-week trip to England that stretched to three months due to the War, they returned to France, where they spent the first winter of the war.

With money acquired from the sale of Stein's last Matisse Woman with a Hat to her brother Michael, she and Toklas vacationed in Spain from May 1915 through the spring of 1916. During their interlude in Mallorca, Spain, Gertrude continued her correspondence with Mildred Aldrich who kept her apprised of the War's progression, and eventually inspired Gertrude and Alice to return to France to join the war effort.

Toklas and Stein returned to Paris in June 1916, and acquired a Ford automobile with the help of associates in the United States; Gertrude learned to drive it with the help of her friend William Edwards Cook. Gertrude and Alice then volunteered to drive supplies to French hospitals, in the Ford they named Auntie, "after Gertrude's aunt Pauline, 'who always behaved admirably in emergencies and behaved fairly well most times if she was flattered.'"

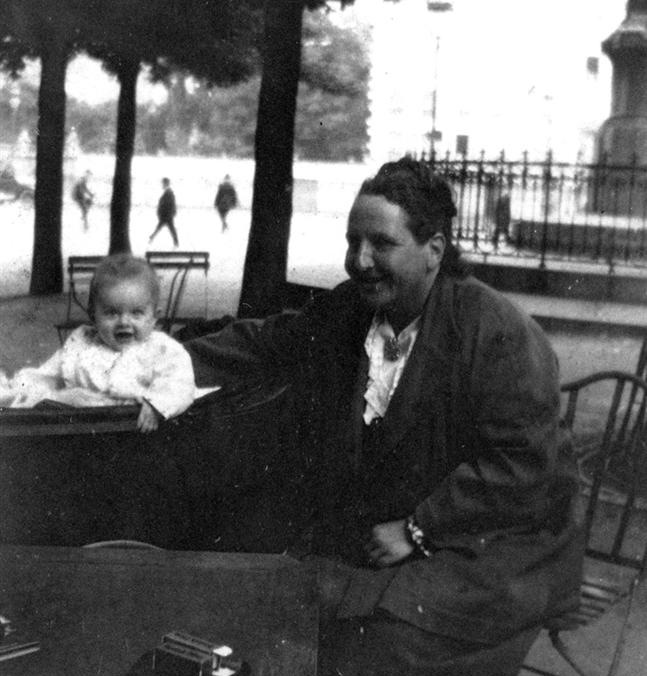
Stein with Ernest Hemingway's son, Jack Hemingway, in 1924. Stein is credited with bringing the term "Lost Generation" into use.

During the 1930s, Stein and Toklas became famous with the 1933 mass-market publication of The Autobiography of Alice B. Toklas. She and Alice had an extended lecture tour in the United States during this decade. They also spent several summers in the town of Bilignin, in the Ain district of eastern France situated in the picturesque region of the Rhône-Alpes. The two women doted on their beloved poodle named "Basket" whose successor, "Basket II", comforted Alice in the years after Gertrude's death.

With the outbreak of World War II, Stein and Toklas relocated to a country home that they had rented for many years previously in Bilignin, Ain, in the Rhône-Alpes region. Stein and Alice, who were both Jewish, escaped persecution probably because of their friendship to Bernard Faÿ who was a collaborator with the Vichy regime and had connections to the Gestapo, or possibly because Stein was from the US and a famous author. Stein's book "Wars I Have Seen" written before the German surrender and before the liberation of German concentration camps, likened the German army to Keystone Cops. When Faÿ was sentenced to hard labor for life after the war, Stein and Alice campaigned for his release. Several years later, Toklas would contribute money to Faÿ's escape from prison. After the war, Stein was visited by many young US soldiers. The August 6, 1945, issue of Life magazine featured a photo of Stein and US soldiers posing in front of Hitler's bunker in Berchtesgaden. They are all giving the Nazi salute and Stein is wearing the traditional Alpine cap, accompanied by the text: "Off We All Went To See Germany."

In the 1980s, a cabinet in the Yale University Beinecke Library, which had been locked for an indeterminate number of years, was opened and found to contain some 300 love letters written by Stein and Toklas. They were made public for the first time, revealing intimate details of their relationship. Stein's endearment for Toklas was "Baby Precious", in turn Stein was for Toklas, "Mr. Cuddle-Wuddle".

=== Lesbian relationships ===
Stein is the author of one of the earliest coming out stories, Q.E.D. (published in 1950 as Things as They Are), written in 1903 and suppressed by the author. The story, written during travels after leaving college, is based on a three-person romantic affair in which she became involved while studying at Johns Hopkins in Baltimore. The affair was complicated, as Stein was less experienced with the social dynamics of romantic friendship as well as her own sexuality and any moral dilemmas regarding it. Stein maintained at the time that she detested "passion in its many disguised forms". The relationships of Stein's acquaintances Mabel Haynes and Grace Lounsbury ended as Haynes started one with Mary Bookstaver (also known as May Bookstaver). Stein became enamored of Bookstaver but was unsuccessful in advancing their relationship. Bookstaver, Haynes, and Lounsbury all later married men.

Stein began to accept and define her pseudo-masculinity through the ideas of Otto Weininger's Sex and Character (1906). Weininger, though Jewish by birth, considered Jewish men effeminate and women as incapable of selfhood and genius, except for female homosexuals who may approximate masculinity. As Stein equated genius with masculinity, her position as a female and an intellectual becomes difficult to synthesize and modern feminist interpretations of her work have been called into question.

More positive affirmations of Stein's sexuality began with her relationship with Alice B. Toklas. Ernest Hemingway describes how Alice was Gertrude's "wife" in that Stein rarely addressed his (Hemingway's) wife, and he treated Alice the same, leaving the two "wives" to chat.

The more affirming essay "Miss Furr and Miss Skeene" is one of the first homosexual revelation stories to be published. The work, like Q.E.D., is informed by Stein's growing involvement with a homosexual community, though it is based on lesbian partners Maud Hunt Squire and Ethel Mars. The work contains the word "gay" over 100 times, perhaps the first published use of the word "gay" in reference to same-sex relationships and those who have them. A similar essay of gay men begins more obviously with the line "Sometimes men are kissing" but is less well known.

In Tender Buttons Stein comments on lesbian sexuality and the work abounds with "highly condensed layers of public and private meanings" created by wordplay including puns on the words "box", "cow", and in titles such as "tender buttons".

== "There is no there there" ==
Along with Stein's widely known "Rose is a rose is a rose is a rose" quotation, "there is no there there" is one of her most famous. It appears in her work Everybody's Autobiography (Random House 1937, p. 289) and is often applied to the city of her childhood, Oakland, California. Defenders and critics of Oakland have debated what she really meant when she said this in 1933, after coming to San Francisco on a book tour. She took a ferry to Oakland to visit the farm she grew up on, and the house she lived in near what is now 13th Avenue and E. 25th Street in Oakland. The house had been razed, and the farmland had been developed with new housing in the three decades since her father had sold the property and moved closer to the commercial hub of the neighborhood on Washington Street (now 12th Avenue).

Stein wrote:

She took us to see her granddaughter who was teaching in the Dominican convent in San Raphael, we went across the bay on a ferry, that had not changed but Goat Island might just as well not have been there, anyway what was the use of my having come from Oakland it was not natural to have come from there yes write about it if I like or anything if I like but not there, there is no there there.

... but not there, there is no there there. ... Ah Thirteenth Avenue was the same it was shabby and overgrown. ... Not of course the house, the house the big house and the big garden and the eucalyptus trees and the rose hedge naturally were not there any longer existing, what was the use ...

It is a funny thing about addresses where you live. When you live there you know it so well that it is like an identity a thing that is so much a thing that it could not ever be any other thing and then you live somewhere else and years later, the address that was so much an address that it was like your name and you said it as if it was not an address but something that was living and then years after you do not know what the address was and when you say it is not a name anymore but something you cannot remember. That is what makes your identity not a thing that exists but something you do or do not remember.

The phrase inspired a metal sculpture by artist Steve Gillman erected in 2005, with words "here" and "there" in all-capitals marking the border between the cities of Berkeley and Oakland.

== Political views ==
Stein was a vocal critic of Franklin D. Roosevelt and the New Deal.

Some have stressed Stein's lesbian, feminist, pro-immigration, and democratic politics. In a 1934 interview published in The New York Times, she stated:

That is the reason why I do not approve of the stringent immigration laws in America today. We need the stimulation of new blood. It is best to favor healthy competition. There is no reason why we should not select our immigrants with greater care, nor why we should not bar certain peoples and preserve the color line for instance. But if we shut down on immigration completely we shall become stagnant. The French may not like the competition of foreigners, but they let them in. They accept the challenge and derive the stimulus. I am surprised that there is not more discussion of immigration in the United States than there is. We have got rid of prohibition restrictions, and it seems to me the next thing we should do is to relax the severity of immigration restrictions.

Stein expressed admiration for Vichy leader Marshal Philippe Pétain. Some have argued for a more nuanced view of Stein's collaborationist activity, arguing that it was rooted in her wartime predicament and status as a Jew in Nazi-occupied France. Similarly, Stein commented in 1938 on Benito Mussolini, Adolf Hitler, Franklin D. Roosevelt, Joseph Stalin and Leon Trotsky: "There is too much fathering going on just now and there is no doubt about it fathers are depressing."

A poem entitled "The Reverie of the Zionist" appears in Stein's posthumous collection Painted Lace and Other Pieces. The scholar Barbara Will has described "The Reverie of the Zionist" as "an obscure and fragmentary modernist dialogue." The poem includes the following lines:

I saw all this to prove that Judaism should be a question of religion.
Don't talk about race. Race is disgusting if you don't love your country.
I don't want to go to Zion.
This is an expression of Shem.

While identified with the modernist movements in art and literature, Stein's political affiliations were a mix of reactionary and progressive ideas. She was outspoken in her hostility to some liberal reforms of progressive politics. To Stein, the Industrial Revolution had acted as a negative societal force, disrupting stability, degrading values, and subsequently affecting cultural decline. Stein idealized the 18th century as the golden age of civilization, epitomized in the U.S. by the era of its Founding Fathers and, in France, by the glory of its pre-revolutionary Ancien Régime. At the same time, she was pro-immigrant, pro-democratic, and anti-patriarchal. Her last major work, the libretto of the feminist opera The Mother of Us All (1947), concerned the socially progressive suffragette movement; another late work, Brewsie and Willie (1946), expressed strong support for U.S. military personnel.

== World War II activities ==
A compendium of source material confirms that Stein may have been able to save her life and sustain her lifestyle through the protection of powerful Vichy government official Bernard Faÿ. Stein had met Faÿ in 1926, and he became her "dearest friend during her life", according to Alice B. Toklas. Faÿ had been the primary translator of Stein's work into French and subsequently masterminded her 1933–34 US book tour, which gave Stein celebrity status and proved to be a highly successful promotion of her memoir, The Autobiography of Alice B. Toklas. Faÿ's influence was instrumental in avoiding Nazi confiscation of Stein's historically significant and monetarily valuable collection of artwork, which throughout the war years was housed in Stein's Paris rue Christine apartment, under locked safeguard.

In 1941, at Faÿ's suggestion, Stein consented to translate into English some 180 pages of speeches made by Marshal Philippe Pétain. In her introduction, Stein crafts an analogy between George Washington and Pétain. She writes of the high esteem in which Pétain is held by his countrymen; France respected and admired the man who had struck an armistice with Hitler. Conceived and targeted for a US readership, Stein's translations were ultimately never published in the United States. Random House publisher Bennett Cerf had read the introduction Stein had written for the translations and was horrified by what she had produced.

Although Jewish, Stein collaborated with Vichy France, a regime that deported more than 75,000 Jews to Nazi concentration camps, of whom only three percent survived the Holocaust. In 1944, Stein wrote that Pétain's policies were "really wonderful so simple so natural so extraordinary". This was Stein's contention in the year when the town of Culoz, where she and Toklas resided, saw the removal of its Jewish children to Auschwitz. It is difficult to say, however, how aware Stein was of these events. As she wrote in Wars I Have Seen, "However near a war is it is always not very near. Even when it is here." Stein had stopped translating Petain's speeches three years previously, in 1941.

Stein was able to condemn the Japanese attack at Pearl Harbor while simultaneously maintaining the dissonant acceptance of Hitler as conqueror of Europe. Journalist Lanning Warren interviewed Stein in her Paris apartment in a piece published in The New York Times Magazine on May 6, 1934. Stein, seemingly ironically, proclaimed that Hitler merited the Nobel Peace Prize.

The Saxon element is always destined to be dominated. The Germans have no gift at organizing. They can only obey. And obedience is not organization. Organization comes from community of will as well as community of action. And in America, our democracy has been based on community of will and effort.... I say Hitler ought to have the peace prize ... because he is removing all elements of contest and struggle from Germany. By driving out the Jews and the democratic Left elements, he is driving out everything that conduces to activity. That means peace.

Given that after the war Stein commented that the only way to ensure world peace was to teach the Germans disobedience, this 1934 Stein interview has come to be interpreted as an ironic jest made by a practiced iconoclast hoping to gain attention and provoke controversy. In an effort to correct popular mainstream misrepresentations of Stein's wartime activity, a dossier of articles by critics and historians has been gathered for the online journal Jacket2.

How much of Stein's wartime activities were motivated by the real exigencies of self-preservation in a dangerous environment can only be speculated upon. However, her loyalty to Pétain may have gone beyond expedience. She had been urged to leave France by US embassy officials, friends and family when that possibility still existed, but declined to do so. In an essay written for the Atlantic Monthly in November 1940, Stein wrote about her decision not to leave France: "it would be awfully uncomfortable and I am fussy about my food." Stein continued to praise Pétain after the war ended, this at a time when Pétain had been sentenced to death by a French court for treason.

Author Djuna Barnes provided a caustic assessment of Stein's book, Wars I Have Seen: "You do not feel that she [Stein] is ever really worried about the sorrows of the people. Her concerns at its highest pitch is a well-fed apprehension."

Renate Stendhal has characterized the accusations against Stein of Nazi collaboration as a "witch hunt".

== Death ==
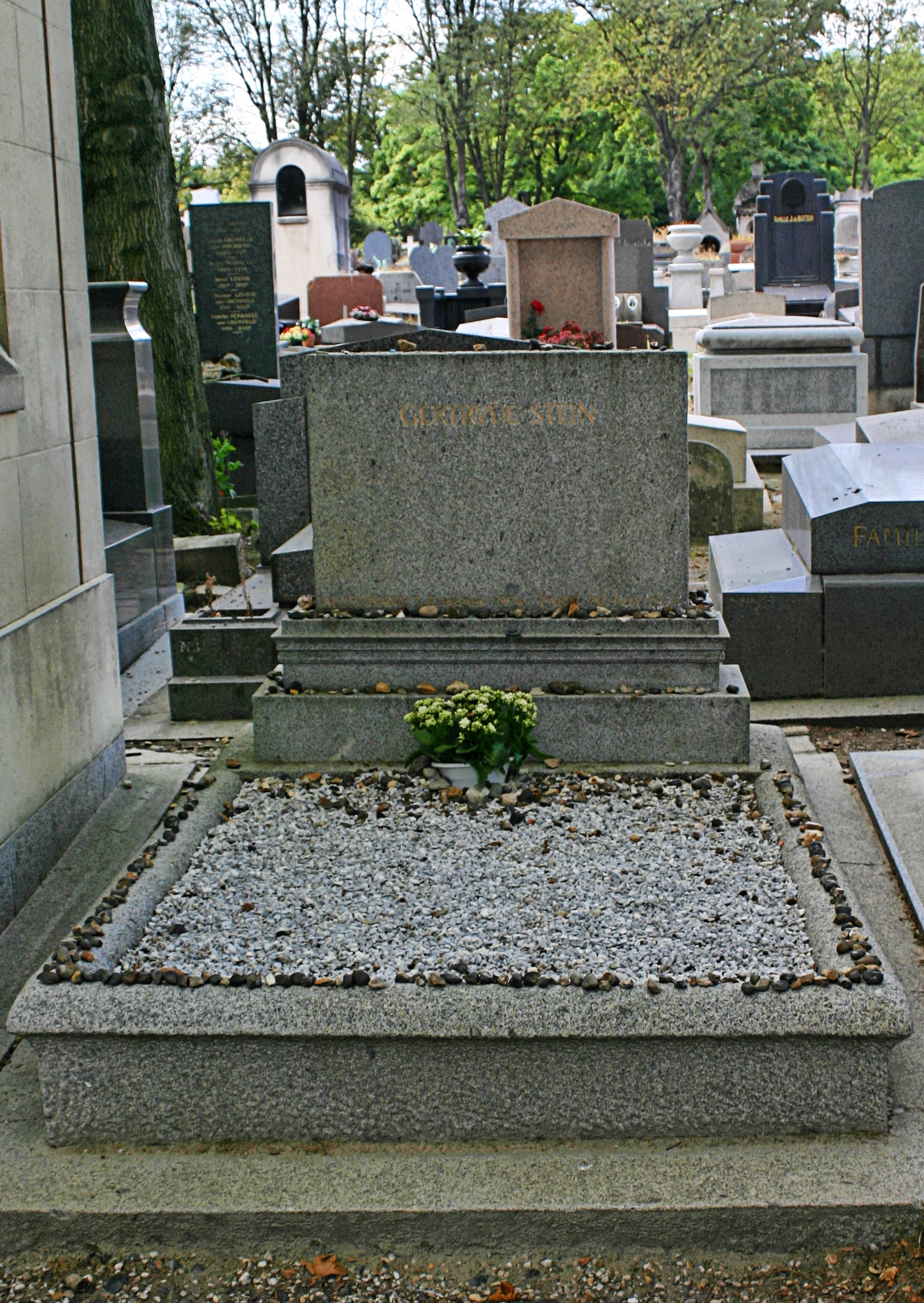
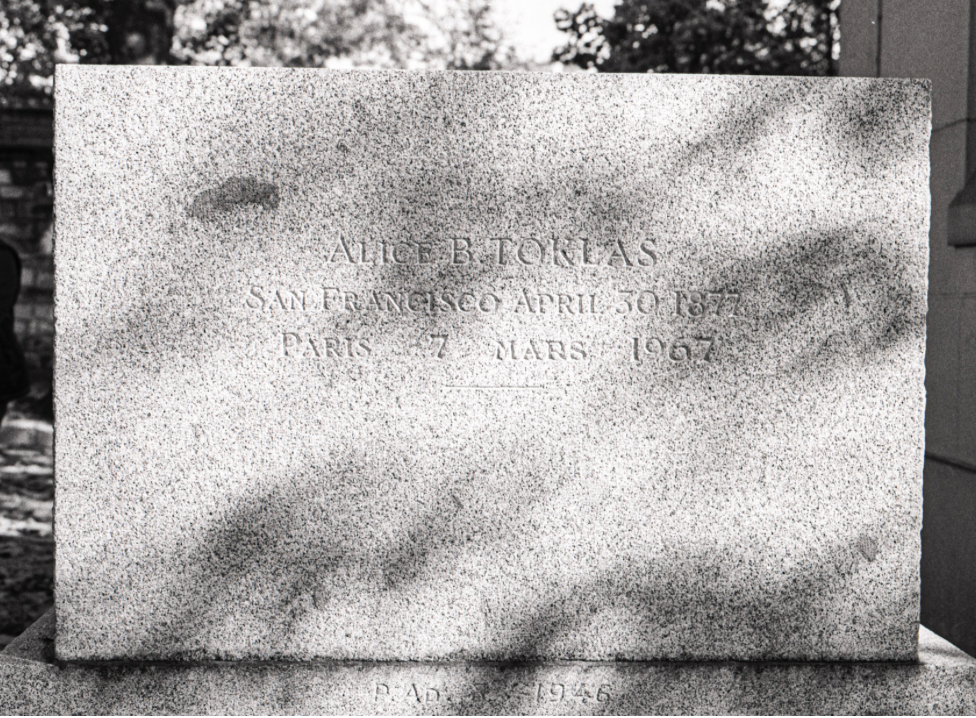
Grave marker front (with Stein's name) and back (with Toklas's) at Père Lachaise Cemetery, Paris

Stein died on July 27, 1946, at the age of 72 after surgery for stomach cancer at the American Hospital in Neuilly-sur-Seine, near Paris. She was interred in Paris in Père Lachaise Cemetery. Later Alice B. Toklas was buried alongside her. Famously, one version of her last moments reports that, before having been taken into surgery, Stein asked her partner Toklas: "What is the answer?" After Toklas replied to Stein that there was no answer, Stein countered by sinking back into her bed, murmuring: "Then, there is no question!"

Her companion Toklas, however, has given two other versions of the encounter—neither of which agrees with the "canonical" version above. Writing in the June 2005 edition of The New Yorker, Janet Malcolm describes:

On July 27, 1946, Stein was operated on for what proved to be inoperable stomach cancer and died before coming out of anesthesia. In "What Is Remembered," Toklas wrote of the "troubled, confused and very uncertain" afternoon of the surgery. "I sat next to her and she said to me early in the afternoon, What is the answer? I was silent. In that case, she said, what is the question?" However, in a letter to Van Vechten ten years earlier, Toklas had written:

About Baby's last words. She said upon waking from a sleep—What is the question. And I didn't answer thinking she was not completely awakened. Then she said again—What is the question and before I could speak she went on—If there is no question then there is no answer.

Stein's biographers have naturally selected the superior "in that case what is the question?" version. Strong narratives win out over weak ones when no obstacle of factuality stands in their way. What Stein actually said remains unknown. That Toklas cited the lesser version in a 1953 letter is suggestive but not conclusive.

Stein named writer and photographer Carl Van Vechten as her literary executor, and he helped to publish works of hers that remained unpublished at the time of her death.

== Critical reception ==
Sherwood Anderson in his public introduction to Stein's 1922 publication of Geography and Plays wrote:

For me the work of Gertrude Stein consists in a rebuilding, an entirely new recasting of life, in the city of words. Here is one artist who has been able to accept ridicule, who has even forgone the privilege of writing the great American novel, uplifting our English speaking stage, and wearing the bays of the great poets to go live among the little housekeeping words, the swaggering bullying street-corner words, the honest working, money-saving words and all the other forgotten and neglected citizens of the sacred and half-forgotten city.

In a private letter to his brother Karl, Anderson said: "As for Stein, I do not think her too important. I do think she had an important thing to do, not for the public, but for the artist who happens to work with words as his material.

James Thurber wrote:

Anyone who reads at all diversely during these bizarre 1920s cannot escape the conclusion that a number of crazy men and women are writing stuff which remarkably passes for important composition among certain persons who should know better. Stuart P. Sherman, however, refused to be numbered among those who stand in awe and admiration of one of the most eminent of the idiots, Gertrude Stein. He reviews her Geography and Plays in the August 11 issue of the Literary Review of the New York Evening Post and arrives at the conviction that it is a marvellous and painstaking achievement in setting down approximately 80,000 words which mean nothing at all.

The interesting writer is where there is an adversary, a problem. Why Stein is not, finally, a good or helpful writer. There is no problem. It's all affirmation. A rose is a rose is a rose.

— Susan Sontag, Journals and Notebooks, 1964–1980

In his 1938 biographical novel The Green Fool, Irish poet Patrick Kavanagh describes the works of Gertrude Stein fondly as being "like whisky to me; her strange rhythms broke up the cliché formation of my thought".

== Legacy and commemoration ==
Stein has been the subject of many artistic works.

In 1982 on PBS, Stein was portrayed by Pat Carroll in the one-woman play Gertrude Stein, Gertrude Stein, Gertrude Stein by Marty Martin.

In Bryant Park, in New York City, there is cast replica of sculptor Jo Davidson's bronze bust of Stein. The original, created in 1923, is now in the collection of the Whitney Museum.

Composers Florence Wickham and Marvin Schwartz used Stein's text for their operetta Look and Long.

In 2005, playwright/actor Jade Esteban Estrada portrayed Stein in the solo musical ICONS: The Lesbian and Gay History of the World, Vol. 1 at Princeton University. In 2006, theatre director/actor Luiz Päetow created his solo, Plays, portraying Stein's 1934 homonymous lecture, and toured Brazil for several years. Loving Repeating is a musical by Stephen Flaherty based on the writings of Gertrude Stein. Stein and Toklas are both characters in the eight-person show. Stein is a central character in Nick Bertozzi's 2007 graphic novel The Salon.

The posthumously published Journals of Ayn Rand contain several highly hostile references to Stein. From Rand's working notes for her novel The Fountainhead, it is clear that the character Lois Cook in that book was intended as a caricature of Stein.

Stein (played by Bernard Cribbins) and Toklas (played by Wilfrid Brambell) were depicted in the Swedish 1978 absurdist fiction film Picassos äventyr (The Adventures of Picasso) by director Tage Danielsson, with Gösta Ekman as Picasso.

Stein was portrayed in the 2011 Woody Allen film Midnight in Paris by Kathy Bates, and by Tracee Chimo in the 2018 season of the television series Genius which focuses on the life and career of Pablo Picasso.

Waiting for the Moon, a movie starring Linda Bassett that was released in 1987. The Young Indiana Jones Chronicles, a TV series starring Alice Dvoráková that was released in 1993.

Stein is added to a list of great artists and notables in the popular Broadway musical Rent in the song "La Vie Boheme". She is also mentioned in the Fred Astaire–Ginger Rogers 1935 film Top Hat and in the song "Roseability" by the Scottish rock group Idlewild.

Composer Ricky Ian Gordon and librettist Royce Vavrek's opera 27 about Stein and Toklas premiered at Opera Theatre of St. Louis in June 2014 with Stephanie Blythe as Stein.

In 2014 Stein was one of the inaugural honorees in the Rainbow Honor Walk, a walk of fame in San Francisco's Castro neighborhood noting LGBTQ people who have "made significant contributions in their fields".

Edward Einhorn wrote the play The Marriage of Alice B. Toklas by Gertrude Stein, a farce about their fantasy marriage that also told the story of their life. It premiered in May 2017 at HERE Arts Center in New York.

The quote "there is no there there" also appears within and is the inspiration for the title There There by Tommy Orange.

The 2018 artwork Words Doing As They Want to Do by Eve Fowler involved recording trans and lesbian Californians reading Stein's 1922 work called "Miss Furr and Miss Skeene".

Stein's text features in Meta Cohen's choral work (i)dentity (2021).

The Gertrude Stein Society (GSS) at the Johns Hopkins University School of Medicine, an organization for LGBTQ+ students at the Johns Hopkins Medical Institutions, is named after her.

== Published works ==
- Three Lives (1909)
- White Wines (1913)
- Tender Buttons: Objects, Food, Rooms (1914)
- An Exercise in Analysis (1917)
- A Circular Play (1920)
- Geography and Plays (1922), includes A List
- The Making of Americans: Being a History of a Family's Progress (written 1906–8, published 1925)
- Stanzas in Meditation (written 1929–1933, published 1956)
- Four Saints in Three Acts (libretto, 1929: music by Virgil Thomson, 1934)
- Useful Knowledge (1929)
- An Acquaintance with Description (1929)
- Lucy Church Amiably (1930). First edition published by Imprimerie Union in Paris. The first US edition was published in 1969 by Something Press.
- How to Write (1931)
- They Must. Be Wedded. To Their Wife (1931)
- Operas and Plays (1932)
- Matisse Picasso and Gertrude Stein with Two Shorter Stories (1933)
- The Autobiography of Alice B. Toklas (1933a)
- Blood on the Dining Room Floor (1933b)
- Portraits and Prayers (1934)
- Lectures in America (1935)
- The Geographical History of America or the Relation of Human Nature to the Human Mind (1936)
- Everybody's Autobiography (1937)
- Picasso, photo. Cecil Beaton (1938)
- Doctor Faustus Lights the Lights (1938)
- The World is Round, UK edition illus. Sir Francis Rose; US edition illus. Clement Hurd (1939)
- Paris France (1940)
- Ida A Novel (1941)
- Three Sisters Who Are Not Sisters (1943)
- Wars I Have Seen (1945a)
- À la recherche d'un jeune peintre (Max-Pol Fouchet, ed., 1945b)
- Reflections on the Atomic Bomb (1946a)
- Brewsie and Willie (1946b)
- The Mother of Us All (libretto, 1946c: music by Virgil Thompson 1947)
- Gertrude Stein on Picasso (1946d)
- Four in America (1947)
- Mrs. Reynolds (1947)
- Last Operas and Plays (Carl van Vechten, ed., 1949)
- The Things as They Are (written as Q.E.D. in 1903, published 1950)
- Patriarchal Poetry (1953)
- Alphabets and Birthdays (1957)
- Fernhurst, Q.E.D. and Other Early Writings (1971)
- Vechten, Carl Van, ed. (1946). Selected Writings of Gertrude Stein.
- Stein, Gertrude; van Vechten, Carl (1986), Burns, Edward (ed.), The Letters of Gertrude Stein and Carl Van Vechten, 1913–1946, New York: Columbia University Press, ISBN 978-0-231-06308-1..
- Stein, Gertrude; Wilder, Thornton (1996), Burns, Edward; Dydo, Ulla, eds., The Letters of Gertrude Stein and Thornton Wilder, Yale University Press, ISBN 978-0-300-06774-3.
- Stein, Gertrude (1998a), Chessman, Harriet; Stimpson, Catharine R. (eds.), Writings 1903–1932, Library of America, ISBN 978-1-883011-40-6.
- ———————— (1998b), Chessman, Harriet; Stimpson, Catharine R. (eds.), Writings 1932–1946, Library of America, ISBN 978-1-883011-41-3.
- Toklas, Alice (1973), Burns, Edward (ed.), Staying on Alone: Letters, New York: Liveright, ISBN 978-0-87140-569-2.
- Grahn, Judy, ed. (1989), Really Reading Gertrude Stein: A Selected Anthology with Essays by Judy Grahn, Crossing Press, ISBN 978-0-89594-380-4
- Vechten, Carl Van, ed. (1990). Selected Writings of Gertrude Stein. ISBN 0-679-72464-8

== In the media ==
- Gertrude Stein, Gertrude Stein, Gertrude Stein (1982 PBS one-woman play by Marty Martin, where Stein's character is played by Pat Carroll)
- Paris Was a Woman (1996 documentary)
- Midnight in Paris (2011 film, where Stein's character is played by Kathy Bates)
- Bad Gays (Season 4, episode 9)

== See also ==
- Lesbian poetry

== Related exhibits ==
- The Steins Collect: Matisse, Picasso, and the Parisian Avant-Garde, The Metropolitan Museum of Art, June 3, 2012
- The Steins Collect: Matisse, Picasso, and the Parisian Avant-Garde, San Francisco Museum of Modern Art, September 6, 2011, archived from the original on June 24, 2011
- Seeing Gertrude Stein: five stories, Washington, D.C.: The National Portrait Gallery, Smithsonian Institution, January 22, 2012
- Seeing Gertrude Stein: five stories, San Francisco: Contemporary Jewish Museum, September 6, 2011, archived from the original on July 28, 2011
- Four Saints in Three Acts: Four live presentations of a new production, San Francisco: Yerba Buena Center for the Arts, August 18–21, 2011, archived from the original on March 21, 2012
- Picasso: Masterpieces from the Musée National Picasso, Paris, San Francisco: M. H. de Young Memorial Museum, October 9, 2011, archived from the original on June 28, 2011
- Riba-Rovira Galeria Muro, Homenage for Gertrude Stein, 2012, Valencia, ES

Awards and achievements
Preceded by Jack Crawford	Cover of Time magazine September 11, 1933	Succeeded by George F. Zook
