= Der Mieter =

Opera by Arnulf Herrmann

- Opera by Arnulf Herrmann
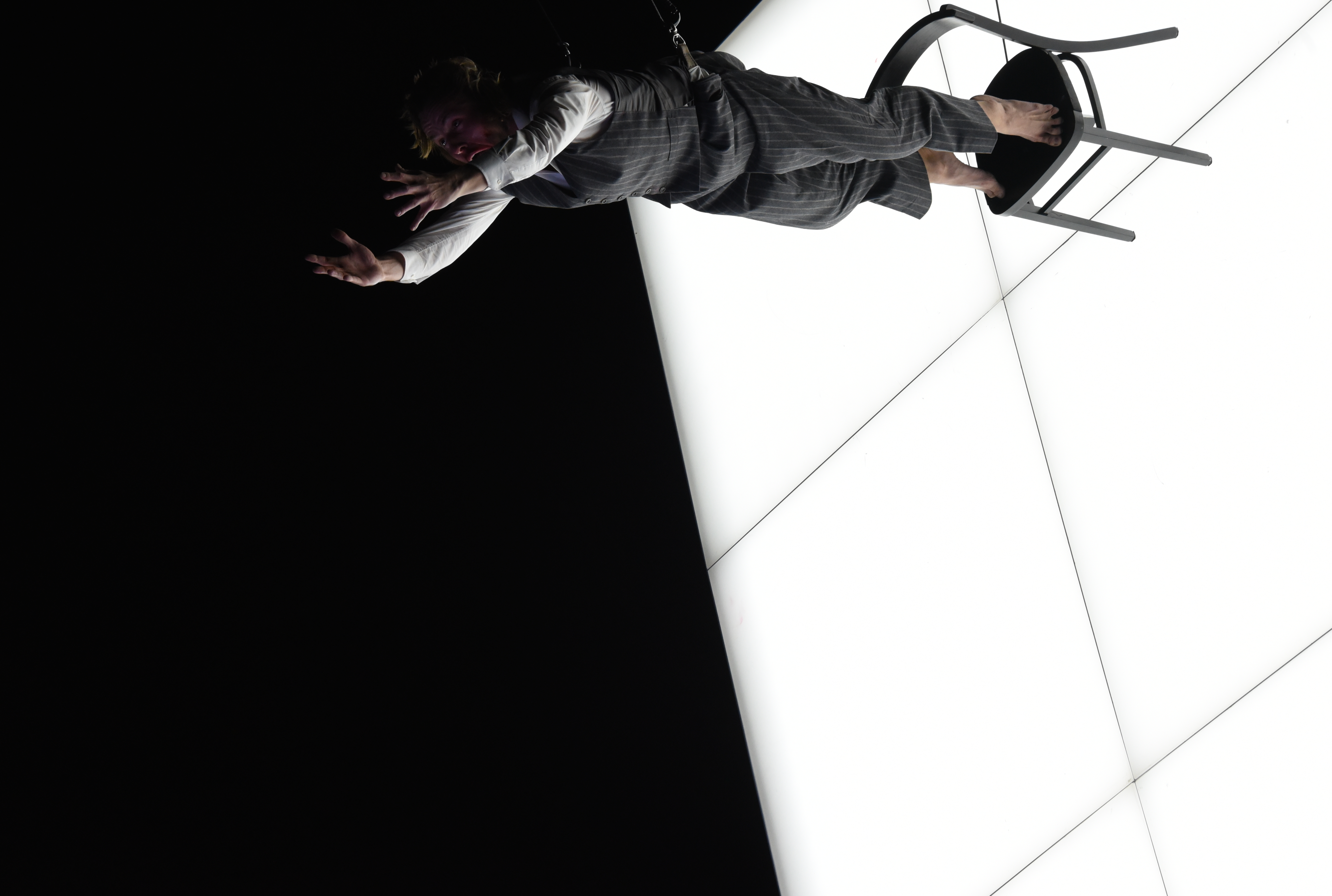
- Björn Bürger in the title role in the premiere
- Translation: The Tenant
- Librettist: Händl Klaus
- Language: German
- Based on: Roland Topor's Le locataire chimérique
- Premiere: 12 November 2017; Oper Frankfurt

Der Mieter (The Tenant) is an opera after the novel The Tenant (Le locataire chimérique) by Roland Topor, with music by Arnulf Herrmann composed in 2012 to 2017. The libretto was written by Händl Klaus. Commissioned by the Oper Frankfurt, the opera was first performed there on 12 November 2017, directed by Johannes Erath and conducted by Kazushi Ōno.

== History ==
Topor's 1964 novel Der Mieter (Le locataire chimérique) was filmed as The Tenant by Roman Polanski in 1976. Händl Klaus wrote the libretto, commissioned by the Oper Frankfurt. Arnulf Herrmann composed the music between 2012 and 2017. For the leading woman, Johanna, he composed three songs (Gesänge) which were premiered already in 2014, titled Drei Gesänge am offenen Fenster (Three Songs at the Open Window) in the Musica Viva concert series. Anja Petersen stepped in as the singer and received critical praise.

The opera was first performed in Frankfurt on 12 November 2017, directed by Johannes Erath in a stage design by Kaspar Glarner with costumes by Katharina Tasch, lighting design by Joachim Klein, video by Bibi Abel, sound design by Josh Jürgen Martin, and with dramaturge Zsolt Horpácsy. Kazushi Ōno conducted the Frankfurter Opern- und Museumsorchester and the Philharmonia Chor Wien.

Reviewer Gerhard R. Koch of the Frankfurter Allgemeine Zeitung saw the danger of rivalry to both the eloquent novel and the film powerful in images, and located the opera between Kafka's The Metamorphosis and Sartre's No Exit.

== Roles ==
Roles, voice types, premiere cast
Roles	Voice type	Premiere, 12 November 2017 Conductor: Kazushi Ōno
Georg	baritone	Björn Bürger
Johanna	soprano	Anja Petersen
Herr Zenk	bass	Alfred Reiter
Frau Bach	mezzo-soprano	Hanna Schwarz
Frau Greiner	mezzo-soprano	Claudia Mahnke
Frau Dorn		Judita Nagyová
Körner	tenor	Michael Porter
Krell	tenor	Theo Lebow
Ingo, Kellner		Sebastian Geyer
Herr Kögel		Miki Stojanov

== Reception ==
The Frankfurt premiere was reviewed mostly with acceptance. A reviewer of the Financial Times warned "If you are feeling unstable, stay away.", and summarised that the production made "this a journey to the blackest regions of an anguished psyche in a hostile world". After praising all who made the performance possible, she concluded:

But it is the pairing of librettist and composer that is perhaps the work's strongest card. Klaus is a writer who knows how music theatre works, a depressingly rare attribute in today’s sensation-hungry world, and he has worked with Herrmann so closely that the words seem to have been born as notes. Der Mieter is a repugnant, dirty, gruelling piece. See it if you can."

The Japanese conductor Kazushi Ōno was seen by a reviewer of Die Deutsche Bühne as a highly competent advocate of the multilayered score ("als hochkompetenter Anwalt von Herrmanns vielschichtiger Partitur"). Andreas Bomba of the Frankfurter Neue Presse reported strong applause for an extraordinary ensemble performance for a work described as suggestive, depressing and intense.

The opera was nominated for the Opera Awards 2018.
