= Anja Petersen =

German operatic soprano

- Born: Anja Metzger
- Education: Musikhochschule Stuttgart
- Occupations: Operatic soprano; Academic lecturer
- Organizations: Neue Vocalsolisten Stuttgart; Oldenburgisches Staatstheater; RIAS Kammerchor
- Awards: Erna Schlüter Prize

Anja Petersen (née Metzger) is a German operatic soprano and university lecturer. She works as a soloist in opera and concert, and as a member of the RIAS Kammerchor. She has appeared in world premieres in both opera and concert, including the leading female role in Arnulf Herrmann's Der Mieter at the Oper Frankfurt in 2017.

== Life and career ==
Born Anja Metzger, she completed her violin and school music studies in Stuttgart and then took her Konzertexamen. During her studies, she was a member of the Neue Vocalsolisten Stuttgart and toured with this ensemble. In 2000, she made her debut as a soloist with the Ensemble Modern at the Klangspuren festival in Tyrol. From 2002 to 2007, she was – still under her maiden name – an ensemble member of the Oldenburgisches Staatstheater, where she performed lyric coloratura roles, including Gilda in Verdi's Rigoletto, Susanna in Mozart's Die Hochzeit des Figaro, Adina in Donizetti's L'elisir d'amore, Olympia in Offenbach's Hoffmanns Erzählungen and Zerbinetta in Ariadne auf Naxos by Richard Strauss. She performed the title role in Violeta Dinescu's Eréndira (based on a story by Gabriel García Márquez) in 2002. In 2006, she participated in the world premiere of the opera Moon Shadow by Younghi Pagh-Paan in Stuttgart. In the 2007/08 season, she was engaged at the Theater Augsburg where she appeared as Mozart's Despina in Così fan tutte and Blonde in Die Entführung aus dem Serail, and as Oscar in Verdi's Un ballo in maschera.

Since the birth of her daughter in 2008, the singer has worked freelance, mainly in the concert hall with a repertoire ranging from Baroque to contemporary. She became a member of the RIAS Kammerchor in 2010. She has worked closely with the WDR Rundfunkorchester Köln and the Kammersinfonie Bremen, and has also sung with the Symphonieorchester des Bayerischen Rundfunks, the Lautten Compagney, the Main-Barockorchester and the Kammerorchester Regensburg. She performed Drei Gesänge am offenen Fenster (Three Songs at the Open Window) by Händl Klaus (text) and Arnulf Herrmann (music) in the world premiere in October 2014 at the Herkulessaal in Munich, in the musica viva series. The song cycle later became part of the opera Der Mieter (The Tenant). She has given guest performances throughout Germany, in the Netherlands, France, and Italy. Since 2010, she has been part of the ensemble of the RIAS Kammerchor. In 2014, 2015, and 2020, she lectured at the Berlin University of the Arts.

Parallel to her concert activities, she took on opera roles, for example, Blonde in Mozart's Die Entführung aus dem Serail at the Hessisches Staatstheater Wiesbaden, at the Theater Bremen, and at the Semperoper in Dresden. In November 2017, she achieved success as Johanna in the world premiere of Der Mieter at the Oper Frankfurt.

== Premieres ==
- 2006: Mondschatten by Younghi Pagh-Paan, after Oedipus at Colonus by Sophokles (libretto: Juliane Votteler) – Chamber Music Theatre of the Staatstheater Stuttgart, director: Ingrid von Wantoch-Rekowski, conductor: Johannes Debus, as Polyneikes and Sphinx 1
- 2017: Der Mieter by Arnulf Herrmann (libretto: Händl Klaus after the novel by Roland Topor) – Oper Frankfurt, director: Johannes Erath, conductor: Kazushi Ōno, as Johanna

== Awards ==
- 2005: Erna Schlüter Prize for exceptional singing achievements at a young age ("außergewöhnliche sängerische Leistungen in jungen Jahren")
