= Arnulf Herrmann =

German composer (born 1968)

- Born: 12 December 1968 (age 57); Heidelberg
- Education: Richard Strauss Conservatory; Hochschule für Musik Carl Maria von Weber; Conservatoire de Paris; Universität der Künste Berlin; IRCAM
- Occupations: Composer; Academic teacher
- Organizations: Hochschule für Musik Hanns Eisler
- Awards: Berliner Kunstpreis

Arnulf Herrmann (born in Heidelberg, 12 December 1968) is a German composer.

After studying piano with Gernot Sieber at the Richard Strauss Conservatory in Munich he enrolled at the Hochschule für Musik Carl Maria von Weber, where he studied composition with Wilfried Krätzschmar and piano with Arkadi Zenzipér. In 1995/96 he was a pupil of Gérard Grisey and Emmanuel Nunes at the Conservatoire de Paris (CNSMDP), after which he completed his training with Hartmut Fladt and Jörg Mainka (theory) and with Friedrich Goldmann, Gösta Neuwirth, and Hanspeter Kyburz at the Universität der Künste Berlin. In 1999/2000 he attended a post-graduate course in composition and new technologies at IRCAM in Paris.

His awards include the Hanns Eisler Composition Prize (2001), the Stuttgart Composition Prize (2003), and the International Rostrum of Composers (for Terzenseele, 2006). In 2008 he was awarded the Förderpreis Musik (of the Kunstpreis Berlin) and a scholarship to the Villa Massimo in Rome. In 2010 he received the Ernst von Siemens Composer Prize.

His first opera, Wasser, with words by Nico Bleutge, received its world premiere at the 2012 Munich Biennale in a co-production with Oper Frankfurt. An excerpt from it was performed at the 2011 Wittener Tage für neue Kammermusik, with soprano Claron McFadden and tenor Sebastian Hübner, and the Ensemble Modern, led by Johannes Kalitzke.

His second opera, Der Mieter, premiered in 2017 at the Oper Frankfurt, directed by Johannes Erath and conducted by Kazushi Ono. The opera is based on Roland Topor's novel Le locataire chimérique which was made into the film The Tenant by Roman Polanski.

From 2004 to 2014, Herrmann taught composition, analysis, and orchestration at the Hochschule für Musik Hanns Eisler, Berlin. From 2014 to 2026 he was professor of composition at the Hochschule für Musik Saar in Saarbrücken. Since 2026, he is professor of composition at the Hochschule für Musik Hanns Eisler.

== Sources ==
- Official website
- Arnulf Herrmann page at Edition Peters: biography and worklist
