= Sergej Newski =

Russian composer

Sergej Pavlovich Newski
- Сергей Павлович Невский
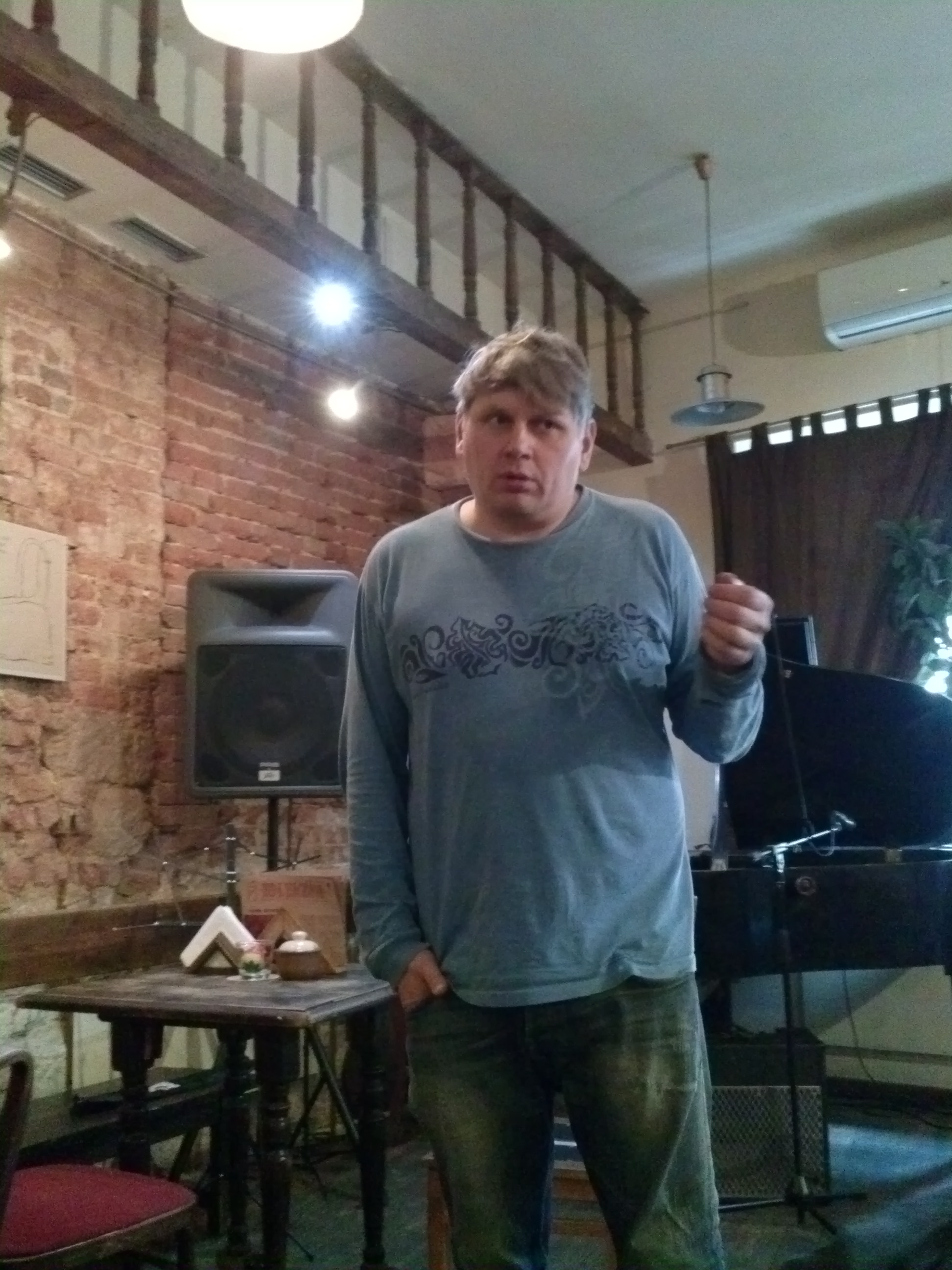
- Sergej Newski in 2016
- Born: October 10, 1972 (age 53); Moscow
- Education: Moscow Conservatory, Hochschule für Musik Carl Maria von Weber, Berlin University of the Arts
- Occupation: Composer

Sergej Pavlovich Newski (Russian: Сергей Павлович Невский, born 10 October 1972) is a Russian composer.

== Life ==
Born in Moscow, Nevsky studied music theory at the Moscow Conservatory. He then continued his studies at the Hochschule für Musik Carl Maria von Weber Dresden with Jörg Herchet and at the Berlin University of the Arts with Friedrich Goldmann. There, he additionally studied music theory and music education with Hartmut Fladt from 2000 to 2005.

Nevsky's music will be performed at the Donaueschinger Musiktages, the Wien Modern, Eclat festivals, among others, MaerzMusik, Ultraschall Berlin, Musica Viva and Warsaw Autumn.

He has received commissions from the Konzerthaus Berlin, the Staatsoper Unter den Linden, the Staatstheater Stuttgart, the Opergruppa (for the Bolshoi Theatre), the Klangforum Wien, Deutschlandradio and the Südwestrundfunk. His opera Franziskus premiered at the Bolshoi Theatre Moscow in September 2012. In February 2020, his music theatre Secondhand-Zeit premiered at the Staatsoper Stuttgart.

== Awards and scholarships ==
- Berliner Kunstpreis (2014).
- Golden Mask (2014).
- Stipendium Villa Aurora in Los Angeles (2014).
- 1st prize in the composition competition of the state capital Stuttgart (2006).
- Deutsche Akademie Casa Baldi (2005).
- Cité internationale des arts Paris (2001/02).

=== Memberships ===
- 2026 Member of the Academy of Arts, Berlin

== Compositions ==
=== Stage work ===
- 2021 music performance »Die Einfachen« (stage director and video artist Ilya Shagalov), Stuttgart, Venice, Berlin
- Secondhand-Zeit (2018/19) based on texts from the eponymous novel by Svetlana Alexievich
- Francis (2008-2012) chamber opera in four scenes based on the play "Saint Francis" by Claudius Luenstedt.
- Autland (2008/09) for six soloists and mixed chamber choir

=== Orchestral work ===
- 18 Episodes for Orchestra (2018/19)
- Heath (2018) for viola and string orchestra
- Cloud Ground (2015) for violin and Orchestra

=== Work for ensemble ===
- Letter to H. Marx (2018) for baritone and 14 instruments
- Galileo: Messenger (2017) for violin and 14 instruments
- Rules of Love (2012/13) for soprano, low alto and five instrumentalists
- Opening Gesture (2011) for solo violin, five percussionists and chamber orchestra
- Working Surface (2011) for solo percussion, solo piano, solo tuba and three instrumentalists
- Alles (2008) for speaker and eight instrumentalists
- Fluss (2003/05) for voice and ensemble

=== Vocal work ===
- Island (2011). Three pieces for mixed choir, accordion and percussion to Die Nibelungen by Friedrich Hebbel.
- Dolze mio drudo (2010). Scenic cantata for five voices, three brass groups and noise instruments. Alternative scoring: madrigal for five voices and four trombones ad libitum. Text: Friedrich II
- What flee hare and hedgehog.... . (2004) for six voices. Text Einar Schleef
- Generator (2001/02) for four vocal soloists.
- Vray dieu d'amours (2007). for bass and alto voice. Text Matthaeus Pipelare

=== Chamber music ===
- Wut (2013) for flute, cello, percussion and piano
- Tcas' (2011/12) for violin and five strings
- channel surfing (2010) for alto saxophone, accordion and double bass
- String quartet no. 3 (2009)
- blind alphabet (2007) for various instrumentations
