= The Incredible and Sad Tale of Innocent Eréndira and Her Heartless Grandmother =

1972 short story by Gabriel García Márquez

The Incredible and Sad Tale of Innocent Eréndira and her Heartless Grandmother
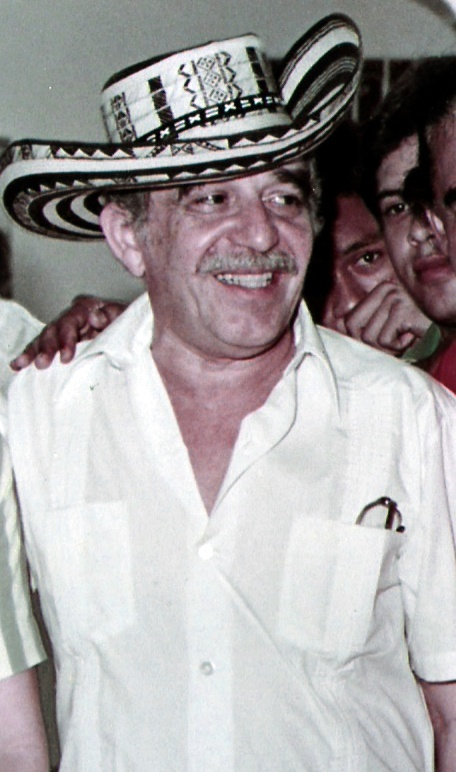
- Gabriel Garcia Marquez 1984.
- Author: Gabriel García Márquez
- Language: Spanish
- Publication date: 1972
- Publication place: Colombia

The Incredible and Sad Tale of Innocent Eréndira and her Heartless Grandmother (Spanish: La increíble y triste historia de la cándida Eréndira y de su abuela desalmada) is a 1972 novella by Colombian writer Gabriel García Márquez.

== Plot summary ==
This is the story of a fourteen-year-old who accidentally sets fire to the house where she lives with her grandmother. The grandmother decides that Eréndira must pay her back for the loss, and sells her into prostitution in order to make money. The story takes on the characteristics of a bizarre fairy tale, with the evil grandmother forcing her Cinderella-like granddaughter to sell her body. They travel all over for several years, with men lining up for miles to enjoy her. At one point, missionaries force the grandmother to give up Eréndira to their custody; the latter, however, chooses to leave the convent and return to her grandmother.

A boy named Ulises falls in love with Eréndira, who returns his feelings. Ulises and Eréndira try to escape, unsuccessfully; the grandmother chains Eréndira and forces her to continue selling her body. By this time she is now 20. Ulises returns and tries to poison the grandmother with arsenic in a birthday cake and to blow her up with a homemade bomb, but she survives all this; he finally stabs the grandmother to death. Eréndira flees alone; nobody ever hears from her again.

== Analysis ==
Márquez wrote that the inspiration for Eréndira came from an experience he had at the age of 16, when he saw an 11-year-old girl being prostituted by a female relative that he believed may have been her grandmother. This memory left an impression on him, and he also used it for One Hundred Years of Solitude.

The story has often been interpreted as an allegory of colonialism, with the abusive grandmother representing Spain, and Eréndira representing the Americas.

== Adaptations ==
The short story was adapted to the 1983 art film Eréndira, directed by Ruy Guerra. Irene Papas acted as the Grandmother and Cláudia Ohana as Eréndira. Violeta Dinescu's opera Eréndira, to a German-language libretto, premiered in 1992 in Stuttgart.
