= Eréndira (opera) =

Romanian opera

Eréndira is an opera in six scenes by Violeta Dinescu (music) with a libretto by Monika Rothmaier based on the story The Incredible and Sad Tale of Innocent Eréndira and Her Heartless Grandmother by Gabriel García Márquez. The premiere took place on 18 March 1992 in the Chamber Theatre of the Staatstheater Stuttgart.

== Action ==
=== First scene: "The wind of misfortune blows..." ===
Eréndira lives with her grandmother in a lonely palace in the desert. While Eréndira helps her dress, the grandmother reminisces about her husband Amadis and son of the same name, who made their living smuggling and are both long dead and buried in the courtyard of the palace. In addition to looking after her grandmother, Eréndira also takes care of the household without complaint. Among other things, she has to wind up countless clocks that run faster and faster. She works so hard that she falls asleep while walking, carrying a soup pot, and drops it in shock at the sound of a bell. Even after she has put her grandmother to bed that evening, she has to iron laundry, put out the flowers and give the "graves to drink". When she finally gets to sleep, she forgets to put out her candelabra because she is so tired. A gust of wind knocks it over and fire breaks out.

=== Second scene: "Departure to the sea" ===
The next day the palace is completely burnt down. Indians from the village collect the remains in sacks. It is raining. Eréndira is distraught as her grandmother blames her for the disaster. To compensate for the financial loss, Eréndira has to prostitute herself. The grandmother haggles with the clients, who look at the girl like an animal. A grocer is the first to make his move and brutally rapes Eréndira backstage. Meanwhile, the grandmother recruits more suitors, including a poor postman who is supposed to advertise for her in return. Another man, Ulysses, wants to take Eréndira for himself completely, but cannot pay the remaining debt of 871,895 pesos calculated by the grandmother. In the meantime, the workers have loaded the still usable items onto a cart. The two women leave.

=== Third scene: "In the desert..." ===
The grandmother has taken up residence with Eréndira in an amusement park in a Colombian slum among black market traders and Indians, where she advertises her dressed-up granddaughter with signs such as "Eréndira is better" or "No life without Eréndira". Although Eréndira suffers badly from the abuse, the grandmother assumes that she will only have paid off her debt in "eight years, seven months and eleven days". Ulysses has followed the two here and tries to buy Eréndira's freedom. The grandmother turns him down on the grounds that he is bad luck: "You won't get in with me without wings!" Only when Eréndira is close to death from exhaustion does the grandmother drive the last ten waiting men away. Eréndira is told to take a sage bath to recover.

=== Fourth scene: "Through the dreams..." ===
After the bath, Eréndira wants to go to bed. "Tears of exhaustion run down her cheeks." The grandmother, already asleep, dreams of her youth and her two amadises. Ulysses takes the opportunity to talk to Eréndira and give her the money. He helps her change the bed sheets. Despite Ulysses' shameful clumsiness, they both grow closer. He tells her about his life as a smuggler of precious oranges that glow from within. The two make love until Eréndira happily falls asleep. Ulysses quietly leaves the tent.

=== Fifth scene: "Desires" ===
Eréndira has been kidnapped and taken to a convent cell wrapped in a mosquito net. Nuns dress her plainly and cut her hair into a brush head. Eréndira refuses to tell them about her life.

In the morning, the grandmother notices the robbery. Enraged, she lets the Indians carry her in the palanquin to the convent. A missionary tries to stop her because he wants to protect Eréndira "from immorality". But when the grandmother points out her "connections to the highest circles", he withdraws. She now seeks support from the mayor - but he thinks his job is merely to make rain. A smuggler also refuses to help her - he does not want to interfere "in matters of God". Pregnant women have gathered in the convent to be ceremonially married. Men are let in for this. The grandmother approaches one of them. She learns that he was promised five pesos for his first communion and offers him twenty if he marries Eréndira. The young man goes to the monastery, receives the blessing and puts a white wreath on Eréndira's hair at the wedding ceremony. Afterwards, he asks her what she wants. Eréndira wants to leave the area.

=== Sixth scene: "Against the wind" ===
On the plantation with the oranges glowing from within, Ulysses longs for Eréndira. He steals three of the precious oranges and sets off in search of her.

The grandmother and Eréndira now live in a magnificent tent on the seashore. Although they have now come into wealth, their relationship has not changed. The grandmother promises her that after her death she will live a free and happy life in her own house. Eréndira likes this thought. She secretly grabs a knife. But just as she is about to stab, the grandmother approaches her to explain the next day's work. Eréndira drops the knife.

After the grandmother has gone to bed, Ulysses appears and shows Eréndira the oranges. Inside is a real diamond. With it, they can travel around the world. The two fall in love. Eréndira persuades Ulysses to kill the grandmother.

Ulysses brings the grandmother a birthday cake "with 72 little pink candles", which she eats with great relish. Although Ulysses had poisoned the cake with copious amounts of arsenic, the grandmother does not die but enters a delusional state, fantasising, dancing and singing in a hoarse voice. Finally, he takes a knife and stabs her first in the chest, then in the back. However, the grandmother resists and even becomes increasingly stronger. Only when he slashes her belly does he reach his goal: "A green fountain pours out of grandmother's womb. Lifeless, she lies on the ground." Eréndira has watched the fight impassively. After making sure of her death, she leaves the tent. Ulysses tries to follow her. He calls after her with "heart-rending cries that were no longer those of a lover, however, but of a son".

== Layout ==
The opera dispenses with the South American ambience of the original. The plot is divided into individual images and image fragments. The three time levels of past, present and future merge, as do real and imagined events. The composer supplemented the external plot with an internal one that was taking place asynchronously. She herself explained this as follows:

So I have not only integrated a linearly functioning story or libretto into my music, but also the becoming and growing of this living space, which Márquez knows how to realise so comprehensibly in his texts. The figures and the instruments, which show and seek themselves in many reflections from the genesis to the definitive transformation of the material, respond to this in the permanent play of an almost hallucinatory spiral impulse - in the form of an organic structure in which each element carries the germ cell of a new story within itself.|author=Violeta Dinescu|source=Über die Entstehung meiner Kammeroper Eréndira|ref=

According to the composer, the composition contains a "Romanian signature" on all levels, which can be seen "in the interval repertoire, in certain tone sequences, certain harmonies and time sequences". The ornaments with very small intervals in the vocal lines were also inspired by the vocal tradition of Romanian folk music. She considers the quarter-tone intervals and the complex rhythmic structures not as a contemporary technique, but as a stylised continuation of the ancient tradition of the songs of Romanian peasants.

The soloists' tasks alternate between declamatory and melodramatic speaking and arios singing. The musical structure seems light and delicate. The composer refrains from superficial sound effects. The colours of the chamber orchestra are used sensitively. In the second scene, when the grandmother forces her granddaughter into prostitution for the first time, the partly sung, partly spoken bargaining for her virginity remains textually intelligible at all times, despite the large instrumentation used here, with all strings, percussion, harpsichord and woodwinds.

The vocal lines reflect the different characters of the main figures. The grandmother's "mad coloraturas", for example, correspond to her delusional state; the part of the submissive Eréndira, on the other hand, often seems strongly restrained or somnambulistic. There is little connection between the vocals and the instruments. Musical devices in the instrumental movement include "string flageolets in extremely high register, oscillating Spaltklang of the winds, discreet chord breaks of the guitar and whispered percussion effects" as well as frequent glissandi.

=== Orchestra ===
The chamber music instrumentation of the opera requires the following instruments:

- woodwind: transverse flute, oboe, clarinet, bassoon
- brass: horn, trumpet, trombone
- drums (three players)
- guitar
- piano (also harpsichord, organ, celesta, synthesizer)
- strings (soloist): violin 1, violin 2, viola, cello, double bass

== History of the work ==
Eréndira is the third stage work by Romanian composer Violeta Dinescu. The libretto by Monika Rothmaier is based on Gabriel García Márquez's short story The Incredible and Sad Tale of Innocent Eréndira and Her Heartless Grandmother. It is a work commissioned by the City of Munich in co-production with the Staatstheater Stuttgart.

In an interview, the composer reported that she had the idea for the material after she had purchased a volume of novellas by Márquez at a book table for relaxation during a Sunday stroll through Baden-Baden. She had been searching in vain for months for suitable opera material and had just decided to give it up for the time being. The last story in this volume immediately appealed to her, and at the end she knew that she had found her material. She was particularly interested in the "combination of fantastic elements and reality" and the "enormous symbolic power of the story". The "transformation of the real into the fantastic and mythical" is also characteristic of Romanian culture.

The musical director of the premiere on 18 March 1992 in the Chamber Theatre of the Stuttgart State Opera was Bernhard Kontarsky. The production was by Beat Fäh, stage and costumes by Carolin Mittler. The singers included Catriona Smith as Eréndira and Catherine Gayer as the Grandmother. From 7 May 1992, the work was performed at the Muffathalle in Munich.

In 1993 (premiere on 17 March), there was a production by the Hans Otto Theater in Potsdam in a production by Bernd Weißig with a set by Matthias Körner. The musical director was Diether Noll. The main roles were played by Alenka Genzel (Eréndira), Christina Ascher (Grandmother) and Hans-Georg Priese (Ulysses). The production was also shown as a guest performance at the 3rd day of the Neue Musiktheater in North Rhine-Westphalia in June 1993.

In the same year (premiere on 9 October 1993), the Wiener Kammeroper also included the opera in its programme. It was a co-production with the Wiener Staatsoper and the Volksoper Wien directed by Kornelia Repschläger. Stage design and costumes were by Mimi Zuzanek. Manfred Ramin conducted members of the Bratislava Symphony Orchestra. The main roles were sung by Alessandra Catterucci (Eréndira), Christina Ascher (Grandmother) and Josef Luftensteiner (Ulysses).

In December 2002, Eréndira was performed at the Oldenburgisches Staatstheater. This production was a great success with many sold-out performances. The production was by Masche Pörzgen, stage and costumes by Cordelia Matthes. Eric Solén conducted. The title role was sung by Anja Petersen, the Grandmother again by Christina Ascher and Ulysses by Paul Brady.
