= Bites and Remission =

Compilation album by Skinny Puppy
- Released: 1987
- Recorded: 1984–85
- Genre: Industrial, electro-industrial, EBM
- Length: 68:55
- Label: Nettwerk

Skinny Puppy chronology
Mind: The Perpetual Intercourse (1986)	Bites and Remission (1987)	Remission & Bites (1987)

Professional ratings
Review scores
Source	Rating
AllMusic	3/5 stars

Bites and Remission is a compilation by Skinny Puppy released on Nettwerk Music Group in 1987. The release of this compilation coincides with that of Remission & Bites and contains many of the same songs, albeit in a different context. This compilation culls songs from the assorted releases of Skinny Puppy's first two albums, Remission and Bites, and features remixes of two songs in place of their original versions.

== Track listing ==
No.	Title	Length
1.	"Film"	2:19
2.	"Smothered Hope"	5:14
3.	"Glass Houses"	3:21
4.	"Far Too Frail"	3:43
5.	"Solvent"	4:38
6.	"Sleeping Beast"	6:01
7.	"Glass Out"	3:25
8.	"...Brap"	1:11
9.	"Assimilate (R-23)"	6:33
10.	"Deadlines"	6:14
11.	"Blood on the Wall"	2:57
12.	"Icebreaker"	3:13
13.	"Christianity"	1:32
14.	"The Choke (Re-Grip)"	6:11
15.	"Social Deception"	2:58
16.	"Basement"	3:28
17.	"Last Call"	5:57

== Notes ==
- The most notable samples on the song "The Choke (Re-Grip)" are from 1976 film The Tenant.
