= Björn Bürger =

German baritone

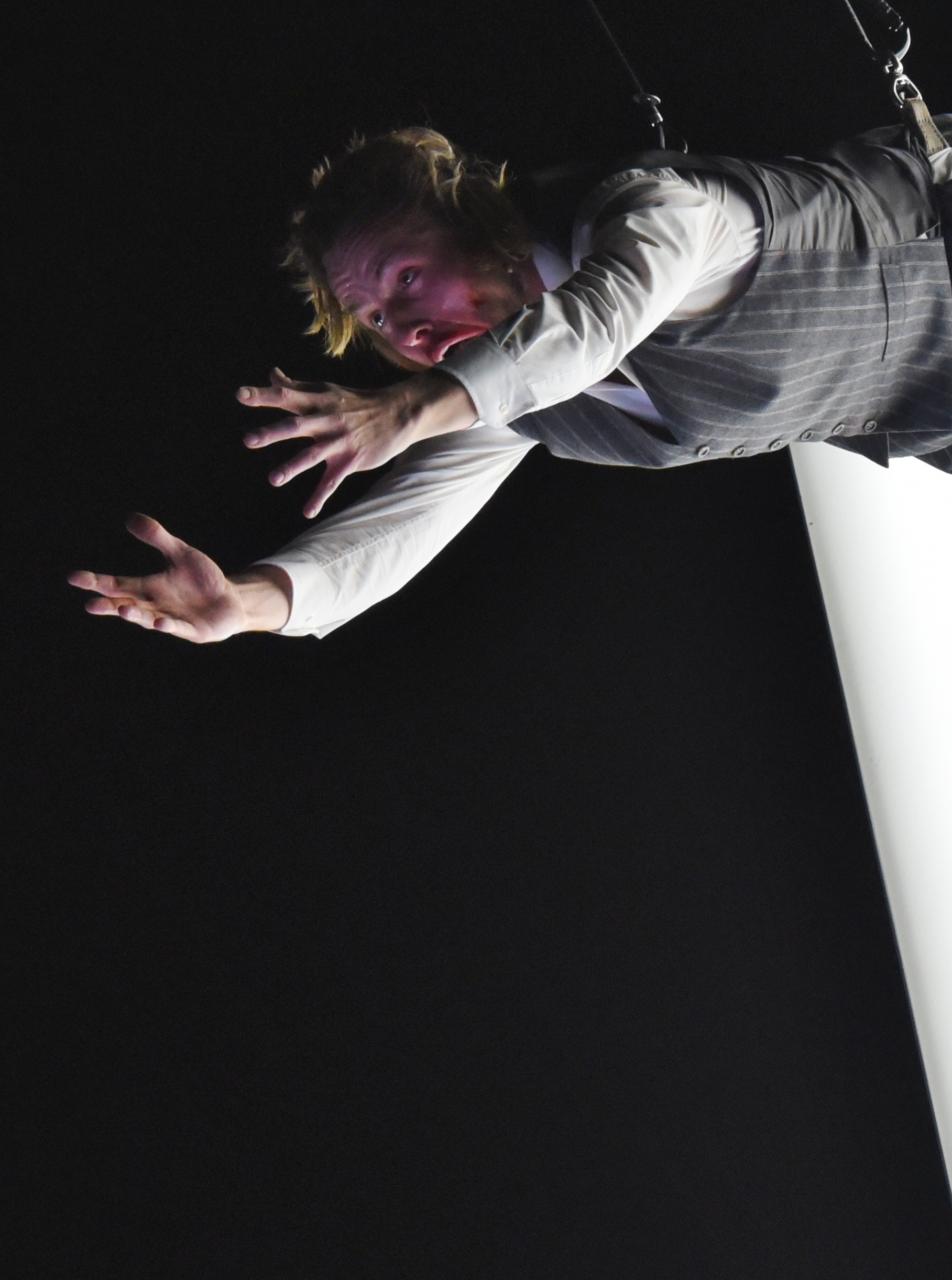
- Björn Bürger in the title role in the 2017 premiere of Der Mieter at the Oper Frankfurt
- Born: 10 October 1985 (age 40); Darmstadt, Hesse, West Germany
- Education: Hochschule für Musik und Darstellende Kunst Frankfurt am Main
- Occupation: Operatic baritone
- Organizations: Oper Frankfurt; Staatsoper Stuttgart
- Awards: Bundeswettbewerb Gesang Berlin
- Website: www.bjoernbuerger.com

Björn Bürger (born 10 October 1985) is a German operatic baritone. The winner of the Bundeswettbewerb Gesang Berlin in 2012, he was a member of Oper Frankfurt from 2013 to 2018, where he performed roles such as the title role in the 2017 world premiere of Arnulf Herrmann's Der Mieter. He has appeared in Europe, including as Rossini's Figaro, Harlequin in Ariadne auf Naxos by Richard Strauss, and Papageno in Mozart's Die Zauberflöte, at the Glyndebourne Festival. He has been a member of the Staatsoper Stuttgart since 2019.

== Life ==
Born in Darmstadt, Bürger, the son of two teachers and five years younger than his brother the actor and theater director Lars Bürger, spent his childhood and youth in Rodgau near Frankfurt am Main.

=== School and university years ===
After primary school, Bürger first attended the Heinrich-Böll-Schule, an integrated comprehensive school in his home town and changed in mid-2002 to the Oswald-von-Nell-Breuning-Schule. There he obtained the Abitur in 2005 and began first a study in the drama department of the Hochschule für Musik und Darstellende Kunst Frankfurt am Main. In 2007 he moved there to the department of opera singing.

=== Musical development ===
Bürger, encouraged by his parents, received early piano lessons at the local free music school and taught himself how to play the guitar. His piano teacher Benjamin Schütze drew his attention to Rio Reiser, and Bürger began to interpret his music playfully and vocally. In addition to his piano training, he also took singing lessons with Gottfried Kärner, the leader of the Polyhymnia pop choir in his hometown, in which Bürger also sang.

While still at school, Bürger was a singer of the band 'Up To Now', and later an active member of the South Hessian artist group Pro-these and the theatre group MomentMal. In 2000 he performed the musical Herr Fresssack und die Bremer Stadtmusikanten at the musical project of the music school Bad Nauheim, which is based on the 1973 radio play of the same name by Ton Steine Scherben. Numerous solo performances as Rio-Reiser interpreter followed. In 2003 Bürger received the cultural award of his hometown "for his artistic work in the fields of singing, theatre and piano" in 2002.

From 2007 to 2013 Bürger studied opera singing at the Hochschule für Musik und Darstellende Kunst Frankfurt am Main in the class of Hedwig Fassbender. During his studies he had four engagements in productions of the Oper Frankfurt besides further solo appearances as Rio-Reiser interpreter and guest roles as opera singer. He also took part in various annual productions at his university, such as the Höchster Opernsommer in the lead role of Osmin in Mozart's Zaide and in the lead role of King Argante at the Handel Festival Karlsruhe. He also appeared in the lead role of Victor Hugo in the world premiere of Paul Leonard Schäffer's operetta Eine Kapitulation to a libretto by Richard Wagner at the Festival junger Künstler Bayreuth.

In November 2012, at the age of 27, Bürger won the Bundeswettbewerb Gesang Berlin finals at the Komische Oper Berlin against eleven other young artists, endowed with €10,000.

Three months later, together with the mezzo-soprano Dorottya Láng, Bürger received the Emmerich Smola prize, one of the highest endowed prizes for young singers. After a concert with the competition finalists in the Festhalle of Landau, the audience decided on the awarding of the prizes, which were associated with a concert engagement with the Deutsche Radio Philharmonie Saarbrücken Kaiserslautern.

Bürger became a member of the Oper Frankfurt with the 2013-14 season. In November 2017 he was able to achieve a great personal success in the title role of the world premiere of Arnulf Herrmann's Der Mieter. According to the Frankfurter Allgemeine he completed a vocal acting tour de force, which he mastered intensely, in many different ways most impressively.“ He remained an ensemble member until 2018.

In 2016 he first performed at the Glyndebourne Festival Opera in Rossini's Il Barbiere di Siviglia in the title role of Figaro. He returned the following year to appeared as Harlekin in Ariadne auf Naxos, and in 2019 for Papageno in Mozart's Die Zauberflöte. He performed as a guest in leading opera houses in Europe, such as Mozart's Don Giovanni at the Oslo Opera House, Wolfram von Eschenbach in Wagner's Tannhäuser at Dutch National Opera, and Count Almaviva in Mozart's Le nozze di Figaro at La Monnaie in Brussels, among others.

For the 2019-20 season Bürger joined the ensemble of the Staatsoper Stuttgart, where he has performed roles such as Posa in Verdi's Don Carlo, Belcore in Donizetti's L'elisir d'amore, Dr. Falke in Die Fledermaus by Johann strauss, Count Almaviva in Mozart's Le nozze di Figaro, the title role of Don Giovanni, and Bill in Weill's Aufstieg und Fall der Stadt Mahagonny.

== Scholarships, honours and prizes ==
- 2003 – Culture Award of the City of Rodgau.
- 2010 – Scholarship of the Yehudi Menuhin Live Music Now.
- 2011 – "MainCampus academicus-Stipendium" of the Stiftung Polytechnische Gesellschaft Frankfurt am Main.
- 2011 – Scholarship of the Da Ponte Foundation.
- 2012 – First prize of the Bundeswettbewerb Gesang (Berlin).
- 2013 – Emmerich Smola Award (Landau).
