= Nicolaus Richter de Vroe =

German composer and violinist

Nicolaus Richter de Vroe (born 1 February 1955) is a German composer and violinist.

== Life ==
Born in Halle (Saale), Richter de Vroe studied composition and violin at the Hochschule für Musik Carl Maria von Weber Dresden from 1972 to 1973, and from 1973 to 1978, he studied violin with Vladimir Malinin at the Tchaikovsky Conservatory in Moscow. From 1980 to 1983 he completed his studies in composition with Friedrich Goldmann at the Academy of Arts, Berlin. He also attended seminars in electronic music led by Georg Katzer.

From 1978 to 1980 he worked as a chamber musician and in 1982 he co-founded the Ensemble für Neue Musik Berlin. In 1980 he became a violinist at the Staatskapelle Berlin. Since 1988 he has worked with the Bavarian Radio Symphony Orchestra. In 1989 he founded "Xsemble München". In 1996 he was a co-initiator of the Munich Society for New Music and a guest of the Goethe Institutes of Buenos Aires, Kyoto and Prague. He is a curator for the Bavarian Radio Symphony Orchestra for the concert series Musica Viva. In 2008, he became a member of the Sächsische Akademie der Künste.

His works have also been premiered at festivals for Neue Musik such as Berliner Festwochen, Biennale di Venezia, Donaueschinger Musiktage, the Festival d'automne à Paris, the Klangaktionen Neue Musik München, MaerzMusik, Steirischer Herbst and Wittener Tage für neue Kammermusik.
