= Theo Lebow =

American operatic tenor

- Born: 1986 (age 38–39); Santa Monica, California, U.S.
- Education: Mannes School of Music
- Occupation: Operatic tenor
- Organizations: Oper Frankfurt

Theo Lebow (born 1986) is an American operatic tenor, based at the Oper Frankfurt. He has performed leading roles in the United States and Europe, including world premieres such as Gordon's 27 and Herrmann's Der Mieter.

== Career ==
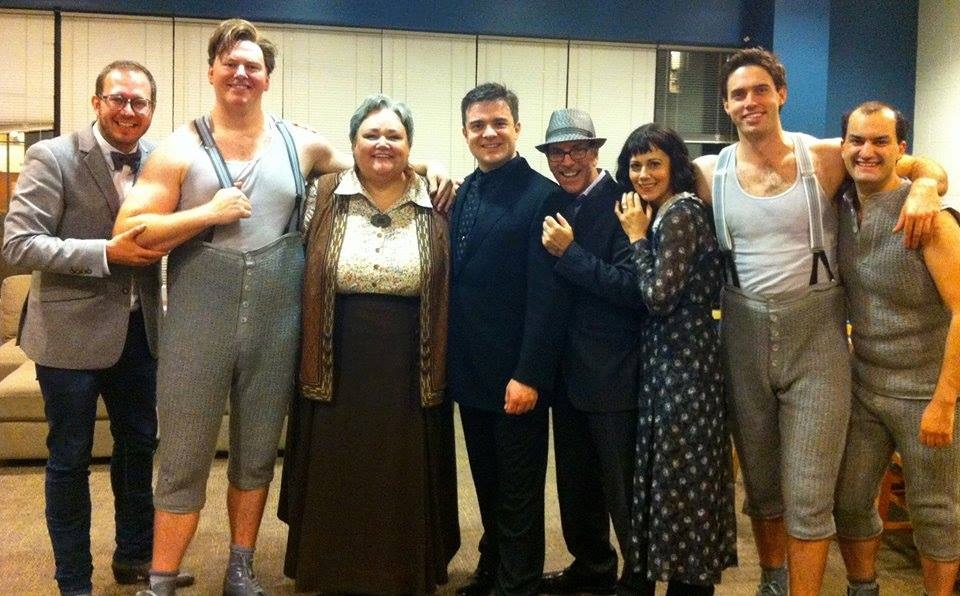
Lebow (right) in the original cast of 27

Lebow was born in Santa Monica, California and grew up in Sierra Madre, where his father was a freelance cellist who played in the local opera orchestra and for Hollywood films. As a boy, he learned piano and clarinet, and sang in a church choir. He performed in the children's choir of the opera, including as a soloist a Boy in Mozart's The Magic Flute. He studied voice at the Mannes School of Music in New York City.

Lebow took part in operas studios in Seattle, San Francisco and the Santa Fe Opera. He appeared as Pablo Picasso and F. Scott Fitzgerald in the world premiere of Gordon's 27 at the St. Louis Opera in 2014, recorded on CD. He performed as Mr. Porcupine in Tobias Picker's Fantastic Mr. Fox at the San Antonio Opera and the Odyssey Opera in Boston, which won a Grammy Award for Best Opera Recording in 2020.

Lebow became a member of the Oper Frankfurt in September 2016. His first roles there were Tamino in Die Zauberflöte and the title role Tom Rakewell in Stravinsky's The Rake's Progress. He took part in the world premiere of Herrmann's Der Mieter. His portrayal of the merchant Sumers in a new production of Cimarosa's L'Italiana in Londra in 2021 was commended by Online Musik Magazin for demonstrating great comedic talent. In 2011, he performed as Contareno in Rossini's Bianca e Falliero, among others. His performance as the toxic father Contareno was praised by Roland Dippel in Neue Musikzeitung for blending tenderness and energy; Dippel noted that Lebow was convincing and never short of breath while singing the long, furious coloratura phrases, which make the part nearly as difficult as the female lead.
