= Friedrich Goldmann =

German composer and conductor

Friedrich Goldmann (27 April 1941 – 24 July 2009) was a German composer and conductor.

== Early life and education ==
Born on 27 April 1941 in Siegmar-Schönau (today a part of Chemnitz), Goldmann's music education began in 1951 when he joined the Dresdner Kreuzchor. At age 18, he received a scholarship by the city of Darmstadt to study composition with Karlheinz Stockhausen at the Internationale Ferienkurse für Neue Musik in 1959, who further encouraged him over the following years.

He moved on to study composition at the Dresden Conservatory from 1959, taking his exam two years early in 1962. From 1962 until 1964 he attended a master class at the Academy of Arts, Berlin with Rudolph Wagner-Régeny. Around this time, he worked as a freelance music assistant at the Berliner Ensemble where he befriended other composers and writers, including Heiner Müller, Luigi Nono and Luca Lombardi. He also met Paul Dessau, who became a close friend and mentor. From 1964 until 1968 he studied musicology at Humboldt University of Berlin, after which he worked as a freelance composer and conductor.

== Career ==
Major commissions include works for the Berlin Philharmonic Orchestra, Semperoper Dresden, the Berlin Staatsoper, three works for Wittener Tage für neue Kammermusik, Ensemble Modern, Arditti Quartet, Komische Oper Berlin, the 20th anniversary celebration of the fall of the Berlin Wall, Expo 2000 in Hannover, several works for Konzerthaus Berlin and the German radio orchestras.

As a conductor, he worked with several orchestras and ensembles, including the Berliner Philharmoniker (with which he recorded Stockhausen's Gruppen), the Gewandhausorchester Leipzig, the Staatskapelle Berlin (including a production of Schönberg's Moses und Aron, directed by Ruth Berghaus, in 1987), the Gruppe Neue Musik Hanns Eisler, and the Scharoun Ensemble. He also performed all over Europe, Russia, the United States, Japan, and South Korea. He had a close working relationship with Ensemble Modern from the first days of the ensemble's formation. Their collaborations included a tour of Russia, the French and West German premieres of Luigi Nono's Prometeo, as well as performances and recordings of Goldmann's own works.

From 1988 he was the principal conductor of the Boris Blacher Ensemble in Berlin. Recordings of his and other composers' music have been released by Nova, Wergo, Deutsche Grammophon, Academy, Edel Classics, RCA, BMG and other labels. Other conductors who have performed his works include Pierre Boulez, Daniel Barenboim, Michael Gielen, Mark Elder, Ernest Bour and Ingo Metzmacher.

From 1980 until 1991, he taught master classes at Berlin's Akademie der Künste. In 1991 he became a professor of composition at the Hochschule der Künste, Berlin (now Universität der Künste). There, he headed the Institute for New Music from 2003 until 2005. Among his students were Enno Poppe, Helmut Oehring, Nicolaus Richter de Vroe, Steffen Schleiermacher, Chatschatur Kanajan, H. Johannes Wallmann, Jakob Ullmann, Charlotte Seither, Arnulf Herrmann, Paul Frick and Sergej Newski.

He was a member of the Academies of Fine Arts of East Berlin (from 1978), West Berlin (from 1990, before the unification of both academies) and Dresden (from 1995). He was also a member of the German-French Cultural Council and Deutscher Musikrat. From 1990 until 1997 he was president of the German section of the ISCM. Awards include the Hanns-Eisler-Preis, Kulturpreis and Nationalpreis of the GDR.

== Death ==
Friedrich Goldmann died in Berlin on 24 July 2009. He was 68 years old. His grave is located at Berlin's Dorotheenstädtischer Friedhof cemetery. Currently the majority of his autograph scores are located at the archive of Berlin's Akademie der Künste.

== Works ==
Goldmann wrote more than 200 compositions. They include chamber music, solo concertos, orchestral works including four symphonies, stage and film music scores as well as one opera, R.Hot oder Die Hitze. A comprehensive list of works can be found on the composer's website.

His output can be divided roughly into three creative periods. His early works from 1963 up to the beginning of the 1970s include several works for the stage as well as chamber music and three "Essays" for orchestra. In these he initially employed serial and cluster techniques, claiming later that he considered most of them "to be thrown away." Around 1969 Goldmann developed a technique of appropriating established musical forms (such as sonata, symphony, string quartet, etc.) and "breaking them open from within", thereby changing their impact and meaning. Important examples of this phase are Bläsersonate (1969) and Symphony No.1 (1971), both of which are major early examples of the deconstruction of the idea of linear progress in new music since the 1970s.

From the end of the 1970s a new tendency evolved that would dominate his third creative period, especially from the late 1990s: autonomous, "absolute" composition. Instead of working with discrepancies, as in "polystylism" or in his previous works, for instance, Goldmann sought interactions and integrations of techniques and material. This approach aims at overcoming assumed antagonisms between different "layers of material." Within the resulting consistent shapes formed from transitions between tones, microtones, and noise, assumed parameter boundaries are meant to dissolve perceptually—thus challenging the concept of musical material as a set of stable entities. Important examples are the String Quartet 2 (1997), the Quartet for Oboe, Violin, Viola and Violoncello (2000), and Quasi una sinfonia (2008).
