= Dinescu =

Dinescu is a Romanian surname. Notable people with the surname include:

- Mircea Dinescu (born 1950), Romanian poet, journalist, and editor
- Violeta Dinescu (born 1953), Romanian classical composer, pianist, and academic
