= Erath =

Erath may refer to:

== Places ==
- Erath County, Texas, named after George Bernard Erath
- Erath, Louisiana, a town in Vermilion Parish
- Erath, a hamlet in Ladakh, India

== People ==
- George Bernard Erath (1813–1891), politician from Texas
- Johannes Erath (born 1975), German opera director
