= Éric Van Beuren =

Belgian field hockey player (born 1942)

Personal information
- Nationality: Belgian
- Born: 5 July 1942 (age 83) Etterbeek, Belgium
- Occupation: Film producer

Sport
- Sport: Field hockey

Éric Van Beuren (born 5 July 1942) is a Belgian former field hockey player and film producer.

Involved in sport in the early part of his life, Van Beuren was a member of the Belgian national team that contested the men's field hockey tournament at the 1964 Summer Olympics in Tokyo. He scored two goals in the tournament, both against Canada in the pool stage.

Later involved in cinema, he formed a production company in 1970 and was involved in a number of films including Souvenir of Gibraltar (1975), Marquis (1989), and Wild Side (2004). Also working in television, he was involved in the production of the children's TV series Téléchat. Van Beuren has acted as vice-president of the Union des Producteurs de Films Francophones (Union of Francophone Film Producers).
