= Souvenir of Gibraltar =

1975 film

- Directed by: Henri Xhonneux
- Written by: Henri Xhonneux
- Produced by: Eric van Beuren
- Starring: Annie Cordy
- Cinematography: Michel Houssiau
- Release date: 24 April 1975
- Running time: 98 minutes
- Country: Belgium
- Language: French

Souvenir of Gibraltar is a 1975 Belgian drama film directed by Henri Xhonneux. It was entered into the 9th Moscow International Film Festival.

== Cast ==
- Annie Cordy as Tina
- Eddie Constantine as Jo
- François-Xavier Morel as Henri Xhonneux
- Armand Xhonneux as Armand Xhonneux
- Luc Muller as Eric Van Beuren
- Margrit Xhonneux as Margrit Xhonneux (as Margrit)
- Manda Hartmann as Li-Tchi
- Suzy Falk as La fermière
- Marie Clémence as La fille du train
