= Henri Xhonneux =

Belgian film director and screenwriter

- Born: 12 June 1945; Eupen, Belgium
- Died: 24 March 1995 (aged 49); Belgium
- Occupations: Film director, screenwriter
- Years active: 1970-1989

Henri Xhonneux (12 June 1945 – 24 March 1995) was a Belgian film director and screenwriter. He directed five films between 1970 and 1989. His 1975 film Souvenir of Gibraltar was entered into the 9th Moscow International Film Festival. He is most notable for his collaborations with graphic artist Roland Topor, with whom he co-created the TV show Téléchat (1981-1985) and the film Marquis (1989).

== Filmography ==
- Take Me, I'm Old Enough/Et ma sœur ne pense qu'à ça (1970, as Joseph W. Rental)
- Débauche de majeures (1970)
- Le jeu de quilles (1973 short)
- Cyclocross (1973 short)
- Souvenir of Gibraltar (1975)
- Téléchat (1982-1985 TV series)
- Le penseur (1987-1992 short film series)
- Marquis (1989)
- Topor père et fils (1993 documentary)
