= Judita Nagyová =

Slovak mezzo-soprano

- Born: Galanta, Slovakia
- Education: Conservatory of Bratislava
- Occupation: Operatic mezzo-soprano
- Organizations: Oper Frankfurt

Judita Nagyová is a Slovak mezzo-soprano. She is a versatile member of the Oper Frankfurt, who has appeared at European opera houses and festivals. She took part in the world premiere of Arnulf Herrmann's Der Mieter.

== Career ==
Born in Galanta, Nagyová studied at the Conservatory of Bratislava. She was a prize winner at international competitions such as the 2009 International Hans Gabor Belvedere in Vienna, where she achieved the special prize of the Deutsche Oper am Rhein. She joined the company's studio from 2009 to 2011. She then moved to the Staatsoper Nürnberg, performing as Second Lady in Mozart's Die Zauberflöte, Orlofsky in Die Fledermaus by Johann Strauss, Mercédès in Bizet's Carmen, Schwertleite and Floßhilde in Wagner's Der Ring des Nibelungen, and Krista in Janáček's Die Sache Makropulos, performing the latter role also at La Fenice in Venice. In 2012, she portrayed the title role of Handel's Ezio at the International Gluck Opera Festival.

In 2014, she moved to the Oper Frankfurt where she appeared as Hänsel in Humperdinck's Hänsel und Gretel and as Dryade in Ariadne auf Naxos by Richard Strauss. She performed there also as Martha in Tchaikovsky's Iolanta, Hannah in Weinberg's Die Passagierin, Anna in Les Troyens by Berlioz, Geneviève in Debussy's Pelléas et Mélisande, Cherubino in Mozart's Le nozze di Figaro, Pippo in Rossini's La gazza ladra, the Old Woman in Martinů's Julietta which was recorded live, and Tisbe in Rossini's La Cenerentola. She took part in the world premiere of Arnulf Herrmann's Der Mieter, and performed as the Stable Girl in Humperdinck's Königskinder in 2021.

She first appeared at the Wiener Festwochen as Hannah in Die Passagierin in May 2016. She has appeared at the Concertgebouw in Amsterdam and the Wexford Festival Opera. At the Bregenz Festival, she performed as Mercédès. At the Tirol Summer Festival in Erl, she appeared as Ježibaba in Rusalka, and as Erda in Wagner's Das Rheingold, directed by Brigitte Fassbaender.

On 10 March 2022, she was the alto soloist in the finale of Beethoven's Ninth Symphony in a charity concert for Ukraine at the Alte Oper Frankfurt, with the hr-Sinfonieorchester conducted by Juraj Valcuha.
