= Téléchat =

Franco-Belgian children's TV series

- Created by: Roland Topor; Henri Xhonneux
- Countries of origin: France; Belgium
- Original language: French
- No. of episodes: 234

Production
- Producer: Éric Van Beuren
- Running time: 5 minutes

Original release
- Network: RTBF1; Antenne 2
- Release: 1983 – 1986

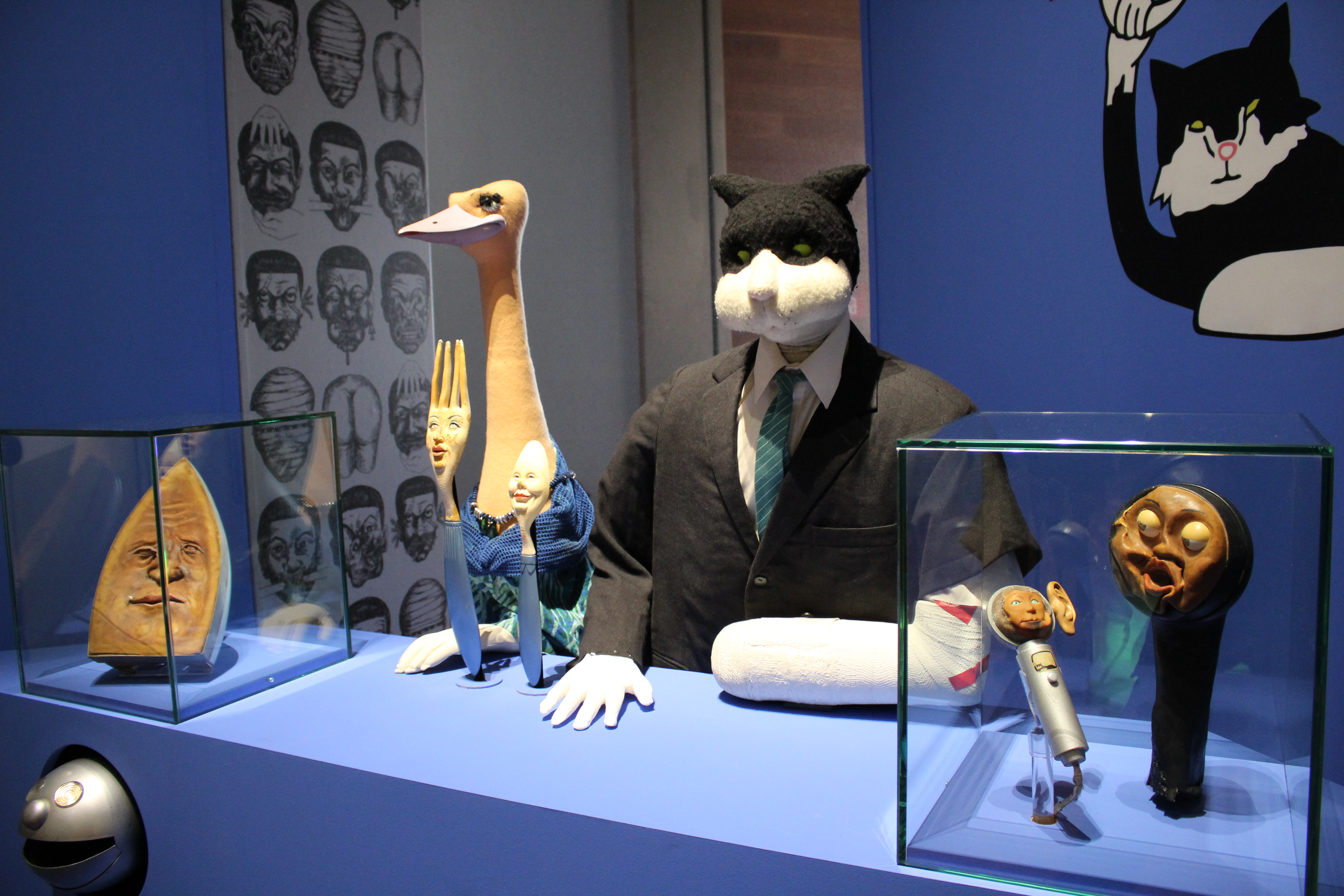
Téléchat puppets on display at Bibliothèque nationale de France (BnF)

Téléchat is a Franco-Belgian French-language children's television series created by Roland Topor and Henri Xhonneux. The series aired on France 2 as a segment of Récré A2, and ran for 234 episodes between 1983 and 1986. A satire of news broadcasting, the series centers around a TV news program presented by two anthropomorphic puppets—Groucha, a cat, and Lola, an ostrich. Many objects in their studio are also anthropomorphic and have the ability to talk. The series was later rebroadcast on France 5 in the 1990s, and on Arte in the 2010s. In Belgium, the series premiered first on RTBF1's Lollipop strand, on 19 September 1983. It also received an English dub under the name of Telecat which aired on TCC in the United Kingdom. Téléchat has received many awards.
