= Remission & Bites =

Compilation album by Skinny Puppy
- Released: 1987
- Recorded: 1984–85
- Genre: Industrial
- Length: 64:17
- Label: Play It Again Sam

Skinny Puppy chronology
Bites and Remission (1987)	Remission & Bites (1987)	Cleanse Fold and Manipulate (1987)

Remission & Bites is a compilation by Skinny Puppy released on Play It Again Sam in 1987. The release of this compilation coincides with that of Bites and Remission and contains many of the same songs, albeit in a different context. This release is, to date, the only CD pressing of Skinny Puppy's first two albums in their original form. While the audio is free of any song-splicing or bonus tracks, the inserts contain a number of shortcomings.

== Track listing ==
No.	Title	Length
1.	"Smothered Hope"	5:14
2.	"Glass Houses"	3:24
3.	"Far Too Frail"	3:41
4.	"Solvent"	4:37
5.	"Sleeping Beast"	6:01
6.	"...Brap"	1:12
7.	"Assimilate"	6:54
8.	"The Choke"	6:30
9.	"Blood on the Wall"	2:57
10.	"Church"	3:12
11.	"Dead Lines"	6:11
12.	"Last Call"	5:54
13.	"Basement"	3:28
14.	"Tomorrow"	4:54

== Notes ==
- The track listing in the liner notes is shown with the songs from Remission on one page and those from Bites on the opposite page, neither of which are numbered.
- The cover art for both albums is displayed above their respective track listings, but with tint errors; the Remission cover appears as black and white and the smaller fossil picture on the Bites cover appears as bright yellow.
- The songs "...Brap" and "Dead Lines" are incorrectly listed on both the disc and liner notes as "Brap" and "Deadline".
- No credits of any kind appear in the liner notes, except for that of the sleeve design, which is credited to "Barbery".
