= Elisabeth Sobotka =

Austrian woman opera director

Elisabeth Sobotka (born 7 October 1965) is an Austrian woman opera director and since January 2015, director of the Bregenzer Festspiele.

== Life ==
Born in Vienna, Sobotka studied musicology at the University of Vienna and graduated in 1990 with a thesis on the conductor Franco Faccio. Afterwards, she worked in the artistic management offices of the Salzburger Festspiele and the Musikalische Jugend Österreichs (Jeunesse) in Vienna. In 1992, Louwrens Langevoort brought her to Leipzig, where she worked for two and a half years with Udo Zimmermann. From 1994, she was chief coordinator of the Wiener Staatsoper for eight years. In autumn 2002, she was engaged by Daniel Barenboim and Peter Mussbach as opera director of the Berlin Staatsoper Unter den Linden.

From 2009 to 2014, Sobotka was artistic director of the Graz Opera. Her directorship was generally regarded as very successful, as she was able to engage not only aspiring singers and conductors, but also a number of renowned directors, like Johannes Erath and Stefan Herheim, who staged Carmen, Rusalka, Manon Lescaut and Serse in Graz. During Sobotka's directorship, Erath worked on a Lohengrin and a staging of Korngold's Die tote Stadt. Lohengrin was also shown at the Oslo Opera.

On 1 January 2015 she succeeded David Pountney as artistic director of the Bregenz Festival. In her first year as Bregenz artistic director, she presented Turandot and The Tales of Hoffmann as a major festival opera in the Festspielhaus. It was staged by Marco Arturo Marelli and Stefan Herheim, conducted by Paolo Carignani and Johannes Debus. At the end of 2019 her contract was extended until September 2024.

Sobotka was Vice-Chairwoman of the University Council of the Mozarteum University Salzburg, and is a member of the Executive Committee of the Executive Master in Arts Administration (EMAA) of the University of Zurich.

== See also ==
- Opernbesetzungen der Bregenzer Festspiele ab 2015
