= 27 rue de Fleurus =

Home of Gertrude Stein in Paris

Coordinates: 48.8469°N 2.3293°E

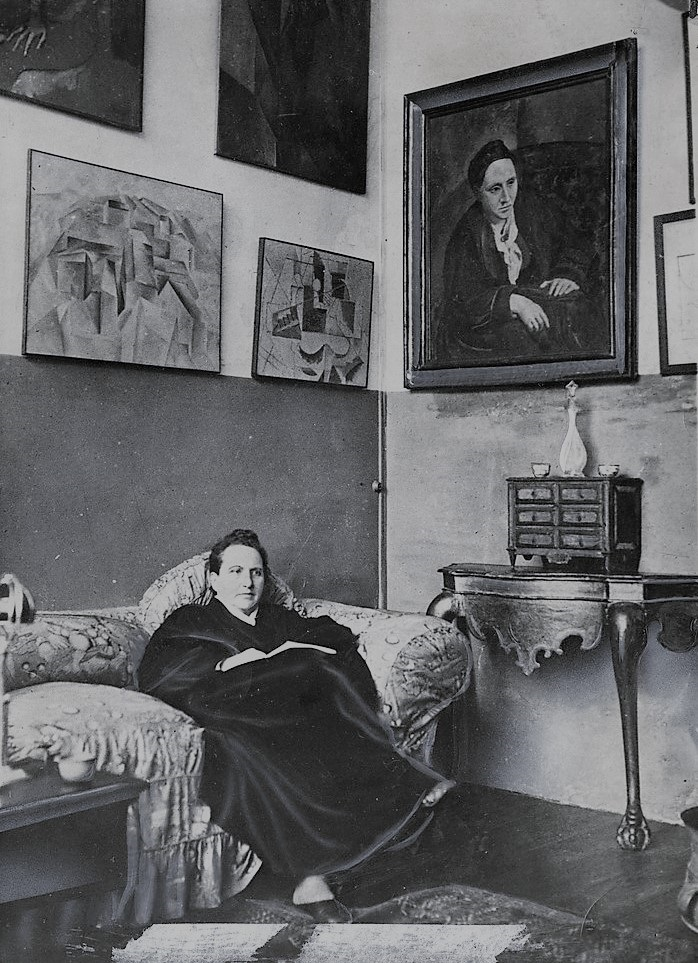
Gertrude Stein at 27 rue de Fleurus with her portrait by Picasso on the wall, May 1930

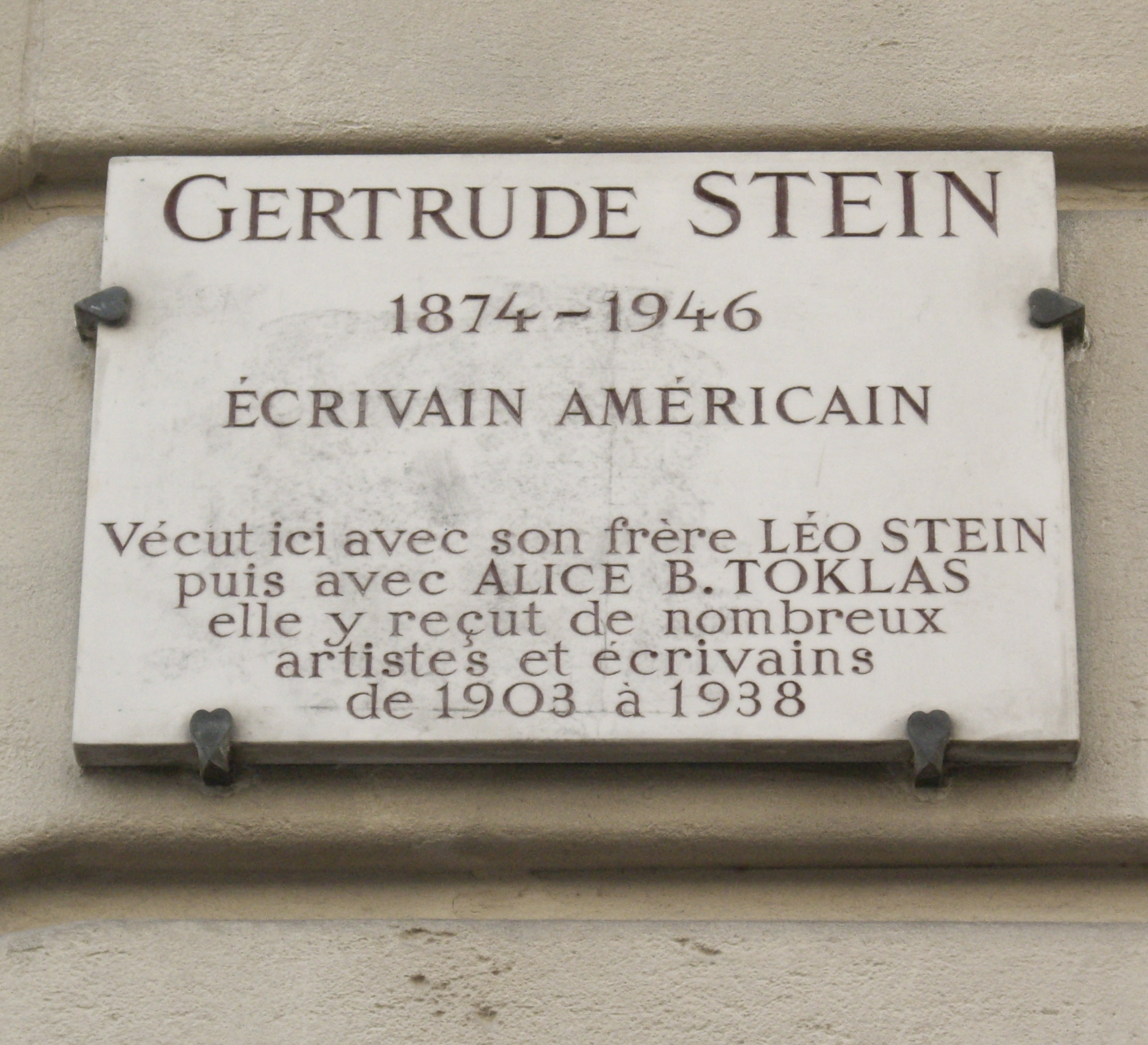
Plaque at 27 rue de Fleurus

27 rue de Fleurus was the home of the American writer Gertrude Stein and her partner Alice B. Toklas from 1903 to 1938. It is in the 6th arrondissement of Paris on the Left Bank. It was also the home of Gertrude's brother Leo Stein for a time in the early 20th century. It was a renowned Saturday evening gathering place for avant-garde artists and writers, notably Pablo Picasso and Ernest Hemingway.

== History ==
Hemingway described Stein's salons in A Moveable Feast. Stein's collection of modern art was displayed in the apartment, including works by Paul Cézanne, Henri Matisse and Pablo Picasso, which she and her brother Leo had bought.

In 1933, Stein published The Autobiography of Alice B. Toklas, a memoir of her life in Paris and driving an ambulance during World War I, written in the voice of Toklas, her life partner. The book was a bestseller and Stein went from relative obscurity to become a well known literary figure.

The gatherings in the Stein home "brought together confluences of talent and thinking that would help define modernism in literature and art." Dedicated attendees included Pablo Picasso and his lover Fernande Olivier, Georges Braque, Ernest Hemingway, F. Scott Fitzgerald, Guillaume Apollinaire and his lover Marie Laurencin, Sinclair Lewis, James Joyce, Ezra Pound, Thornton Wilder, Juan Gris, Sherwood Anderson, Francis Cyril Rose, René Crevel, Élisabeth de Gramont, Francis Picabia, Claribel Cone, Mildred Aldrich, Carl Van Vechten and Henri Matisse, André Derain, Max Jacob, Henri Rousseau, and Joseph Stella.

Saturday evenings had been set as the jour fixe for formal congregation so Stein could work at her writing uninterrupted by impromptu visitors.

Stein herself attributed the beginnings of the Saturday evening salons to Matisse, as

[m]ore and more frequently, people began visiting to see the Matisse paintings—and the Cézannes: "Matisse brought people, everybody brought somebody, and they came at any time and it began to be a nuisance, and it was in this way that Saturday evenings began."

== In popular culture ==
The 2014 opera 27 by Ricky Ian Gordon and Royce Vavrek is inspired by events at 27 rue de Fleurus. The place is also depicted in the Woody Allen's movie Midnight In Paris.
