= Marquis (film) =

- German poster
- Directed by: Henri Xhonneux
- Written by: Marquis de Sade (writings); Roland Topor; Henri Xhonneux
- Produced by: Claudie Ossard; Eric van Beuren
- Starring: François Marthouret (voice); Valérie Kling (voice); Michel Robin (voice); Isabelle Wolfe (voice); Vicky Messica (voice); René Lebrun (voice)
- Cinematography: Étienne Fauduet
- Edited by: Chantal Hymans
- Music by: Reinhardt Wagner
- Production companies: Aligator Producciones; Tchin Tchin Productions
- Distributed by: Netherlands: Cor Koppies Filmverhuur; USA: YC Alligator Film
- Release date: 26 April 1989 (France)
- Running time: 88 minutes
- Countries: Belgium; France
- Language: French

Marquis is a 1989 film directed by Henri Xhonneux. A Belgium-France co-production, it is based on the life and writings of Marquis de Sade. All the actors wear animal masks, and their voices are dubbed. There are a few scenes involving clay animation. The film was a project by French cartoonist Roland Topor, who had previously delivered the imagery for the 1973 animated film Fantastic Planet. Since its release, Marquis has developed a cult following.

The tagline used in the US release was, "A bizarre tale of sex, lust, and the French Revolution".

== Plot ==
In pre-revolutionary France, the canine Marquis de Sade sits in jail working on his writing and having conversations with his penis which has a face and is named Colin. When Colin is not whining about his need for stimulation and espousing his impulsive philosophies, he is "telling stories" that make up the Marquis' work (some of which is illustrated via clay animation).

The Marquis was imprisoned for allegedly defecating on a cross, however he is also accused of raping and impregnating the bovine Justine. The latter is a plot by the camel-headed priest Don Pompero and the cocky Gaetan De Preaubois try to keep secret the fact that Justine's rapist was actually the King of France.

Meanwhile, the revolutionaries prepare to stage a coup and depose the king, under the lead of Juliette de Titane, an equine noble. Several of the inmates are also political prisoners leading to several failed escape attempts which land the inmates in the Bastille dungeon. They are eventually freed, however, by the revolutionaries.

Colin falls in love with Juliette eventually and runs away with her to continue the revolution, leaving the Marquis to continue his writing and to muse about his life in peace.

== Voices ==
Character	Voice of:
Marquis de Sade	François Marthouret
Colin	Valérie Kling
Ambert	Michel Robin
Justine	Isabelle Wolfe
Don Pompero	Vicky Messica
Gaetan De Preaubois	René Lebrun
