= H. Johannes Wallmann =

H. Johannes Wallmann (born 23 February 1952, in Leipzig) is a contemporary composer and integral artist. His works cover compositions for landscape sound and three-dimensional sound, chamber music and orchestra. as well as musical combination and self organisation systems. He developed the basis for a new aesthetic theory and terminated after many years 2005 the work on a book with the title: Integrale Moderne – Vision und Philosophie zur Kultur, Demokratie und Ökonomie der Zukunft ("Integral modern trends – vision and philosophy for the culture, democracy and economics of the future").

== Works ==
- "GLOCKEN REQUIEM DRESDEN - Komposition für 129 vernetzte Dresdner Kirchenglocken" (“BELLS REQUIEM DRESDEN - composition for 129 networked Dresden church-bells")
- "KLANG FELSEN HELGOLAND - Landschaftsklang-Komposition" (“SOUND ROCK HELGOLAND - landscape sound composition”)
- "INNENKLANG-AUSSENKLANG - Musik im Raum für 4 Orchestergruppen, Soprane und Soundscapes" (“INTERIORSOUND-COUNTERSINK-LONG - music in space for 4 orchestral groups, sopranos and soundscapes”) Broadcast Symphony Orchestra Berlin
- "intars 2138" - Dresden Philharmonic Orchestra
- Lichtklang-Landschaft "der grüne klang" (Light sound landscape “the green sound”)
- MAN-DO - Musik im Raum für 6 Instrumentalgruppen" ("Music in space for 6 instrumental groups") Berlin Philharmonic Orchestra
- DER BLAUE KLANG - Landschaftsklang-Komposition für voneinander weitentfernte Vokal- und Orchestergruppen für die "Wörlitzer Anlagen" (The BLUE SOUND - landscape sound composition for widely separated vocal and orchestral groups for the “Wörlitzer plants”)
- "GLOCKEN REQUIEM XXI für drei voneinander weitentfernte Chorgruppen, 137 Glocken und elektronische Klänge" (“BELLS REQUIEM XXI for three widely spaced groups of choirs, 137 bells and electronic sounds”)

== Bibliography ==
- Integrale Moderne - Vision und Philosophie der Zukunft, ISBN 3-89727-332-2, ISBN 978-3-89727-332-0
