= Spaltklang =

Spaltklang (literally: split sound) is a term in music theory. It is defined as an extremely clear and transparent sound pattern of an instrumental piece. It stands in opposition to the music of the Classical-Romantic period which favoured the merging of the individual instrumental voices to one complex sound.

Examples of applied Spaltklang can be found in New Music such as Igor Stravinsky’s Histoire du soldat. Instrumental categories are represented by the high- and low-pitched instruments; middle-toned instruments, on the other hand, are not accounted for. In the string section, for instance, only violin and double bass are represented, while viola and cello are not. This pitch gap creates a clear contrast and prevents the individual tones from merging into one sound.

Moreover, the term appears in connection with multiphonics.

The term Spaltklang can also be found in the field of organ building. Here, it refers to organs that have registers with very different and distinct timbres. Therefore, single registers tend to be played in isolation. This is in contrast to organs which operate on the basis of a merged sound, which is achieved by adding registers to a root note. Spaltklang seems to be particularly associated with organs from the Renaissance period. Amongst organists, Spaltklang is furthermore used to describe the omission of a register, e.g. playing the 8‘ and 2’ registers but omitting the 4’ register.
