= Stiftung Polytechnische Gesellschaft =

German charitable foundation based in Frankfurt

Stiftung Polytechnische Gesellschaft Frankfurt am Main
- Abbreviation: SPTG
- Formation: 2005
- Founder: Polytechnische Gesellschaft
- Type: Charitable foundation
- Legal status: Foundation under German civil law
- Headquarters: Frankfurt, Germany
- Region served: Frankfurt
- Chair of the executive board: Frank E. P. Dievernich
- Website: www.sptg.de

The Stiftung Polytechnische Gesellschaft Frankfurt am Main is a charitable foundation based in Frankfurt, Germany. It was established in 2005 by the Polytechnische Gesellschaft. The foundation supports educational, scientific, technological, cultural, social and civic projects in Frankfurt and projects undertaken in the interests of the city's residents.

== History ==
The foundation was created by the Polytechnische Gesellschaft in 2005. Most of its initial capital came from proceeds generated by the sale of the Frankfurter Sparkasse to Landesbank Hessen-Thüringen. Its initial endowment was approximately €397 million.

By October 2023, the foundation's assets had increased to approximately €515 million. According to the Frankfurter Allgemeine Zeitung, the foundation had spent more than €100 million on projects for residents of Frankfurt between its establishment and October 2023.

== Organisation and activities ==
The Stiftung Polytechnische Gesellschaft both funds external initiatives and operates projects of its own. Its activities include:

- education and language learning;
- science, technology and vocational education;
- social, humanitarian and charitable work;
- cultural education;
- education for civic participation and sustainability; and
- democracy education.

The foundation describes its work as being focused on Frankfurt and the interests of the city's residents. Its programmes are intended to promote education, individual development, social participation and civic responsibility.

Projects run or supported by the foundation have included the Deutschsommer language programme, the Diesterweg Scholarship for children and their parents, the Junior Engineer Academy, Meine Zeitung, the Stadtteil-Botschafter neighbourhood-ambassador programme, the Stadtteil-Historiker local-history programme, the Digitechnikum, the Junge Paulskirche and programmes supporting vocational training, music education, early parenthood and civic participation.

== Awards and recognition ==
Programmes associated with the foundation have received several awards:

- In 2012, the Diesterweg Scholarship for children and their parents was selected as one of 52 winners of the nationwide Ideas for the Educational Republic competition.
- In 2016, the DeutschSommer programme received the Institution Prize of the Kulturpreis Deutsche Sprache.
- In 2018, Tablets im Unterricht – Pilotklassen im Projekt „Meine Zeitung – Frankfurter Schüler lesen die F.A.Z.“ received third place in the outstanding digital reading-promotion category of the German Reading Prize.
- In 2018, the Willkommenstage in der frühen Elternzeit programme received third place in the Hessian Prevention Prize.
- In 2020, the Stadtteil-Historiker programme received a recognition award in the Stiftung Citoyen's Citoyenne civic-engagement competition.

In 2016, the Association of German Foundations awarded the German Founders' Prize to the Polytechnische Gesellschaft. The award recognised its establishment of the Stiftung Polytechnische Gesellschaft, the Frankfurter Stiftung für Blinde und Sehbehinderte and the Wöhler-Stiftung.

== Publications ==
- Stiftung Polytechnische Gesellschaft Frankfurt am Main. Prägungen: Ein Magazin zum zehnjährigen Bestehen der Stiftung Polytechnische Gesellschaft Frankfurt am Main. Frankfurt am Main: Stiftung Polytechnische Gesellschaft, 2015. (in German)
- Stiftung Polytechnische Gesellschaft Frankfurt am Main. Bildung. Verantwortung. Frankfurt. Frankfurt am Main: Stiftung Polytechnische Gesellschaft, 2019. (in German)
- Ramonat, Oliver. Das Polytechniker-Haus: Eine kurze Geschichte der Untermainanlage 5. 2nd ed. Frankfurt am Main: Stiftung Polytechnische Gesellschaft, 2019. (in German)
