= Gerhard Rohde =

German music critic (1931–2015)

Gerhard Rohde (9 September 1931 – 25 February 2015) was a German music critic.

== Life and career ==
Born in Kiel, Rohde initially studied law at the University of Kiel and attended lectures by the musicologist Friedrich Blume.

After his studies, he wrote as a free critic for music and theatre for regional newspapers and the magazine Musikalische Jugend. From 1962, he was a North German theatre reporter for the Neue Zürcher Zeitung.

From 1964 to 1967 he worked as a music editor at the Hannoversche Rundschau and then moved to Frankfurt from 1967 to 1974 as editor at the "Zeitung für Frankfurt", the local section of the Frankfurter Allgemeine Zeitung. Rohde remained a freelance writer for the FAZ until the end of his life, also with contributions to cultural policy.

From 1968 to 2007, Rohde was editor-in-chief of the Neue Musikzeitung (nmz), which had emerged from the Musikalische Jugend, after which he joined the editorial board.

Rohde reported on all important European music events. He was particularly interested in Neue Musik.

On 20 February 2015, Rohde was awarded the "Happy New Ears Prize for Journalism of the Hans and Gertrud Zender Foundation for his contributions to New Music at the Bavarian Academy of Fine Arts. He was unable to accept the prize in person for health reasons.

Rohde died in Bad Schwalbach aged 83.

== Publications ==
- with Hans Landesmann (ed.): Salzburger Festspiele 1992 bis 2001. Vol. 2. Konzert. Zsolnay, Vienna 2001
