= Violeta Dinescu =

Romanian composer, pianist and professor

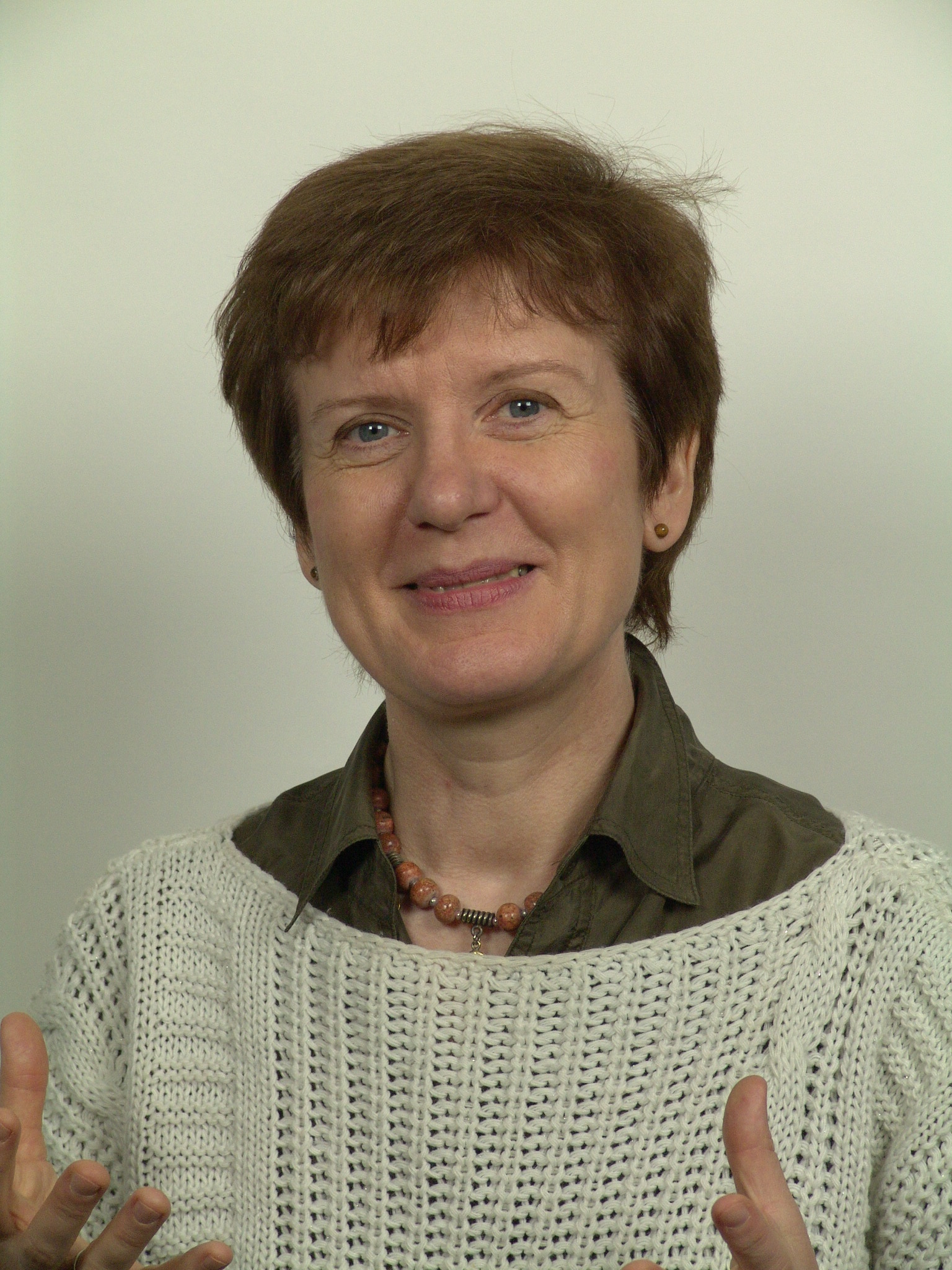
- Violeta Dinescu (2005)
- Born: 13 July 1953 (age 73); Bucharest, Romanian People's Republic
- Education: Ciprian Porumbescu Conservatory
- Occupations: Composer; Pianist; Academic teacher
- Organizations: University of Oldenburg

Violeta Dinescu (born 13 July 1953) is a Romanian composer, pianist, and academic teacher, living in Germany since 1982. She has been professor of applied composition at the University of Oldenburg from 1986.

== Romania ==
Born in Bucharest on 13 July 1953, Dinescu began her studies of music in 1972 at the Ciprian Porumbescu Conservatory in Bucharest, composition with Myriam Marbe. In 1978 she received her master's degree with distinction. She also received diplomas in the fields of Composition, Piano and Pedagogics. She started teaching at the George Enescu Music School in Bucharest, conducting courses in Music history, Aesthetics, Counterpoint, Harmony and Piano. In 1980 she joined the Romanian Composers Union.

== Germany, operas ==
In 1982, she moved to West Germany. Her first opera, Hunger und Durst after Eugène Ionesco, was premiered in Freiburg in 1986. Der 35. Mai (The 35th of May, or Conrad's Ride to the South Seas), a children's opera after Erich Kästner was composed in 1986, Eréndira after a short story by Gabriel García Márquez in 1992 and performed at the third Munich Biennale, Schachnovelle (The Royal Game) after Stefan Zweig in 1994. The operas have been performed at leading opera houses, as Der 35. Mai at the Staatsoper Hamburg in 2004. She worked for the Austrian theatre ARBOS on two music theatre projects, "The Singing of The Fools About Europe" and "The Concert of Birds". Herzriss, an opera in nuce for voice and percussion after Homer, Ionesco, and Márquez, premiered in 2005.

== Teaching ==
Since 1986, she has been teaching at German music academies in Heidelberg, Frankfurt, Bayreuth, and since 1996 as a professor of Applied Composition at the University of Oldenburg. There she started in 1996 to invite composers to a yearly Komponisten-Colloquium, in 2009 among others Jean-Luc Darbellay and Graham Waterhouse.

Dinescu has been an executive board member of the International Alliance of Women in Music since 1987. Her works were published by Verlag Dohr and Schott Music, among others.

== Work ==
The prolific composer of orchestral music, chamber music, choral and vocal music received many international prizes and awards. Major commissioned works include Akrostichon and L‘ORA X for orchestra, an oratorio for Pentecost, Pfingstoratorium, music for the F. W. Murnau silent film Tabu and the ballets Der Kreisel and Effi Briest.

Her works include:

- Akanua, piano, 1974
- Sonata, violin or viola, piano, 1975
- In meinem Garten, text by Ana Blandiana, children’s chorus, 1980
- Mondnächte, text by Joseph von Eichendorff, mezzo-soprano, saxophone, percussion, 1986
- Akrostichon, orchestra, 1983
- Der Kreisel, ballet, scenario after Eduard Mörike, orchestra, 1985
- Hunger und Durst, chamber opera, libretto by the composer after Ionesco, small orchestra (14 players), 1985
- Concerto, voice, orchestra, 1986
- Quatrain, text by François Villon, female voice, 1986
- Dona nobis pacem, mezzo-soprano, cello (+ percussion), 1987
- Tabu, film score for silent movie, small orchestra, 1988
- ICHTHYS, violin, cello, piano, 1991
- Der 35 Mai, children’s opera, libretto by the composer after Kästner, 3 soloists, 8 mixed voices, children’s chorus, orchestra, 1986
- Eréndira, chamber opera, libretto by the composer after Márquez, 7 soloists, small orchestra, 1992
- Pfingstoratorium, 5 soloists, mixed chorus, small orchestra, 1993
- Schachnovelle, chamber opera, libretto by the composer after Stefan Zweig, 3 soloists, chamber ensemble, 1994
- L'ORA X, orchestra, 1995
- Self-Reflections I/II, piano, live electronics, 1996–97
- Effi Briest, ballet, scenario after Theodor Fontane, orchestra, 1998
- Vortex – Wolken I, II und III, small orchestra, 1998
- Licht-Bruch, accordion, 2001
- Rugá, clarinet, double bass, accordion, 2001
- Herzriss, opera in nuce, female voice and percussion, 2005
