= Hartmut Fladt =

German musicologist and lyricist

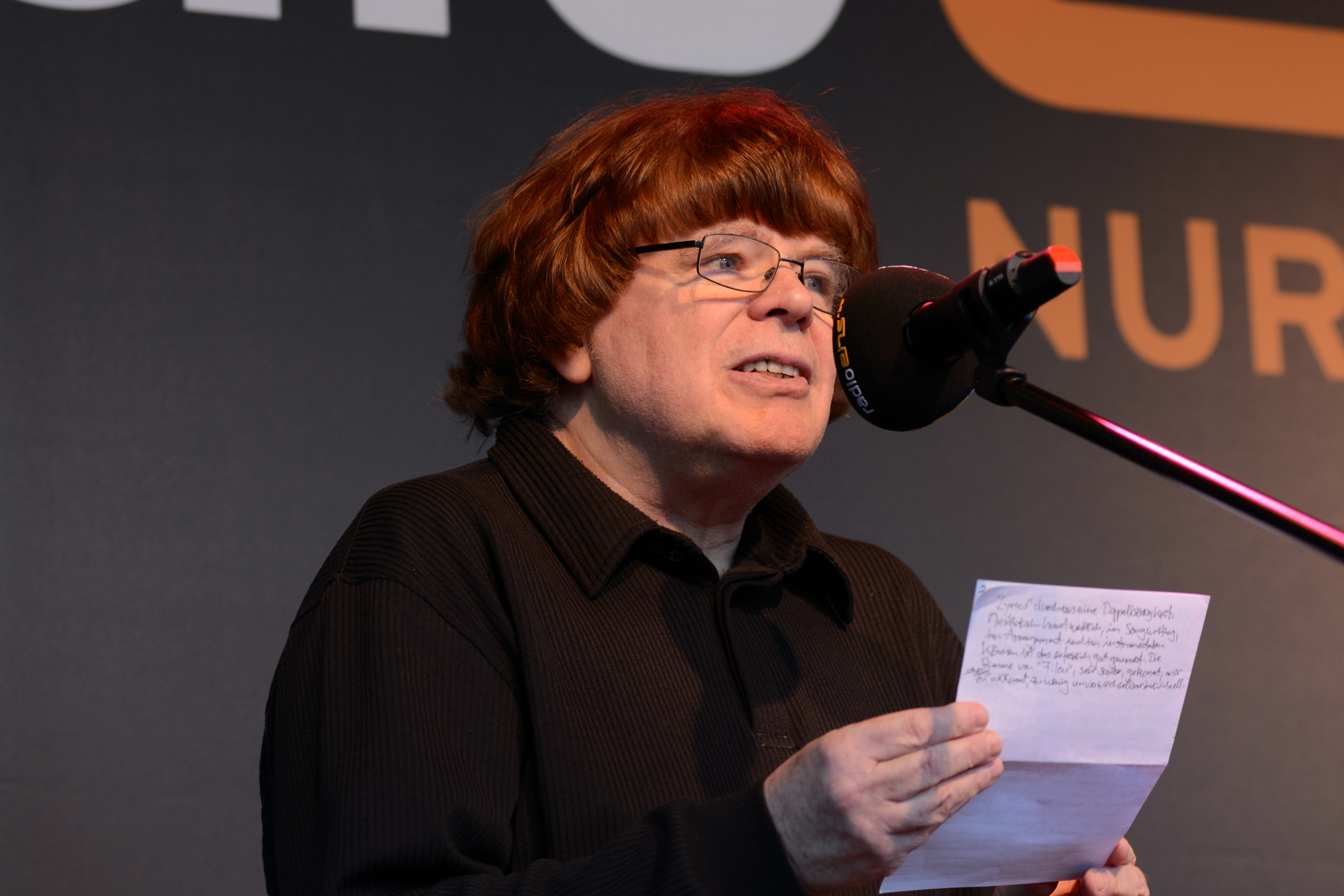
Hartmut Fladt (2013)

Hartmut Fladt (born 7 November 1945) is a German composer and musicologist.

== Life ==
Born in Detmold, Fladt studied composition with Rudolf Kelterborn in his hometown and musicology with Carl Dahlhaus in Berlin. Since 1981 he has been professor for music theory at the Universität der Künste Berlin.

Fladt composed numerous stage works, including opera and ballet, but also chamber music, orchestral and choral works, film music and children's songs. He is also a member of the Hanns Eisler Choir in Berlin.

On Radio Eins he is a guest on the Monday show "EINS am Abend", with a music analysis.

Fladt was recognized in the public due to his expert activity in court proceedings. In 2010 he investigated songs of the rapper Bushido for plagiarism of the French band Dark Sanctuary.
