= Johannes Erath =

German opera director

Johannes Erath (born 1975) is a German opera director.

== Career ==
Erath was born in 1975 in Rottweil. First he studied violin with Rainer Küchl at der University of Music and Performing Arts, Vienna and with Hansheinz Schneeberger in Freiburg. He worked as an orchestra musician at the Volksoper Wien and at the Orchesterakademie of the Vienna Philharmonic. Thereafter he decided to go toward directing. First he served as an assistant to Willy Decker, Nicolas Brieger, Guy Joosten, Peter Konwitschny and Graham Vick in theaters all over Europe. 2002 he became Stage Manager at the Hamburg State Opera. From 2005 till 2007 he held a scholarship of the Deutsche Bank Stiftung and their »Akademie Musiktheater heute«.

Among the early productions of Erath were mostly operas by contemporary composers — i.e. the world premiere of Jörn Arnecke's Drei Helden in Rheinsberg, Gerhard Schedl's Triptychon, Dieter Kaufmann's Fuge Unfug-e, Elliott Carters What Next? and the world premiere of Péter Eötvös’ Paradise Reloaded at the Neue Oper Wien. Thereafter he was also asked to direct classical repertory such as Un ballo in maschera in Bremerhaven, Les contes d’Hoffmann and Cendrillon am Stadttheater Bern, Orfeo ed Euridice und Aida at the Oper Köln, Eugene Onegin in Mainz, La traviata and The Cunning Little Vixen at the Hamburg State Opera.

Productions by Johannes Erath
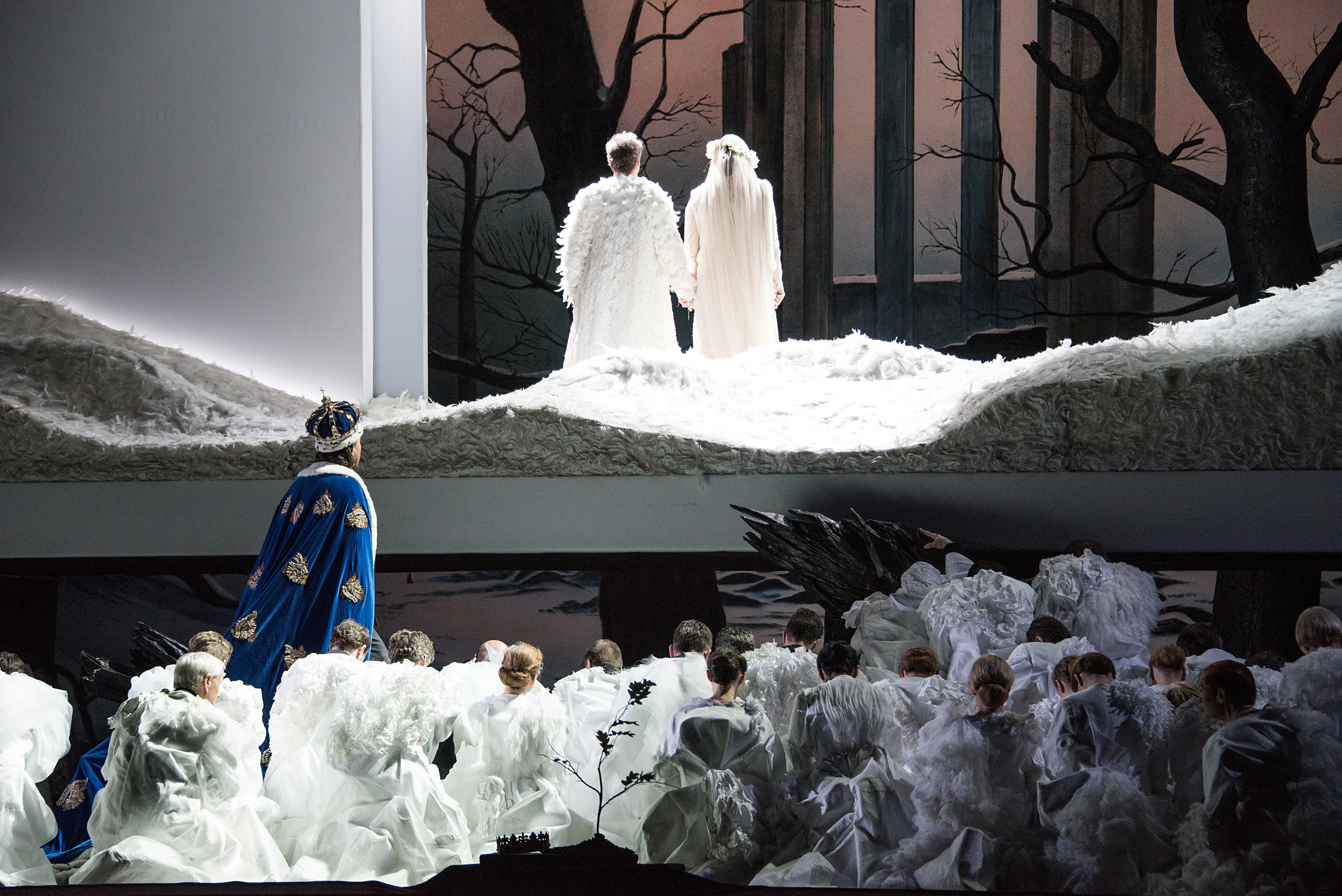
Lohengrin
Graz Opera 2013, Oslo Opera 2015

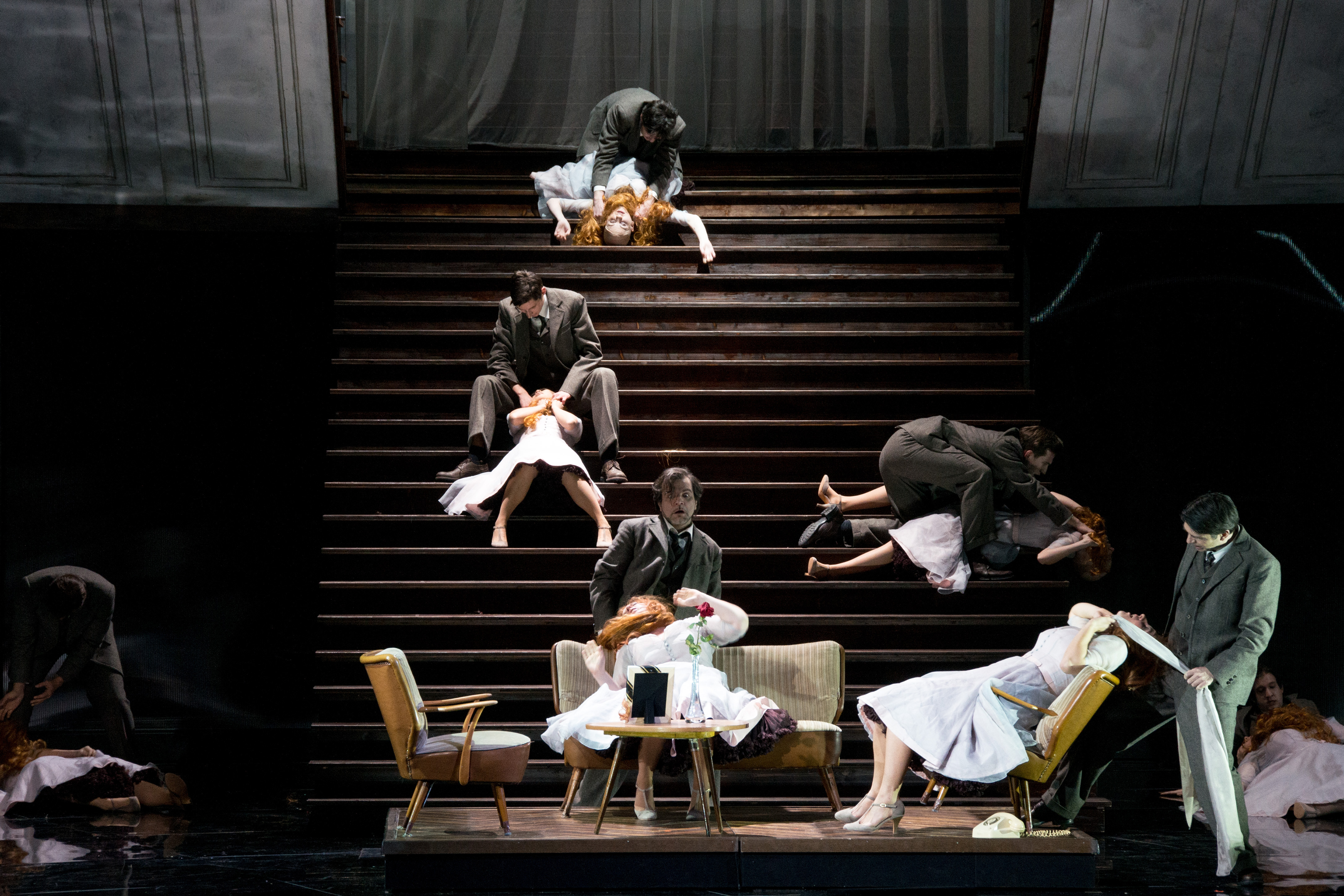
Die tote Stadt
Graz Opera 2015

A long term cooperation was established with Graz Opera during the directorship of Elisabeth Sobotka (2009-2015). In Graz Erath directed Alban Berg's Lulu and Mozart's Don Giovanni (both 2010), Elektra by Hugo von Hofmannsthal und Richard Strauss (2012), Wagner's Lohengrin (2013) and Korngold's Die tote Stadt (2015). Especially Lohengrin — 2015 transferred to Oslo Opera — achieved high acclaim from public and press. Vienna's Kurier praised the direction as ″poetic, visually stunning and partially fairytale like.″ The costumes for this production were designed by French couturier Christian Lacroix with whom Erath had already created Aida in Cologne.

Since 2009, Erath regularly works at Oper Frankfurt. He debuted with Eötvös’ opera version of Angels in America in an outlet of the company, the Bockenheimer Depot. In the main opera house he presented Verdi's Otello in 2011, Händel's Giulio Cesare in Egitto in 2012 and Carl Maria von Weber's Euryanthe in April 2015. In June 2015 his mise-en-scène of Mozart's Le nozze di Figaro premiered at the Semperoper in Dresden. He used elements from Commedia dell’arte at the beginning of the opera. kultiversum reported that Erath „placed the action in three historic settings: Firstly on a stylized wooden pedestal the archaic world of Commedia dell’Arte bringing into remembrance that Da Ponte based his personalities on this ancient typology. Secondly a classical baroque scenery representing late 18th century. Lastly the open stage of modern theatre breaking theatrical conventions also acoustically with spoken parts of dialogue and interspersing them with pits and parts of French chansons played on an accordion.“ The Frankfurter Allgemeine Zeitung described his interpretation as „Comedy of Losses“.

Erath belongs to the faculty of Berlin University of the Arts where he teaches Scenic Studies.

== Quotes ==
The still young director Johannes Erath lately has aroused the attention of major opera houses. [...] Hereby he unveiled his talent for bringing alive the roles with an accurate psychological understanding of their personalities — and this can not be taken for granted nowadays. His talent proofs itself in a graphic way when he directs Otello. He tightens a plausible netting amongst the figures of the opera, but also clarifying that the conflict of Otello is based in his own personality structure.

— Gerhard Rohde, Der weiße Mohr meuchelt sein Alter Ego, Frankfurter Allgemeine Zeitung, December 6, 2011

The archaic desire for revenge is something precultural — see "eye for an eye'". Klytämnestra has many good reasons to hate Agamemnon. He robbed her daughter already before the Trojan war. The hatred of Hass Elektra instead stems from love deprived. She is still a girl refusing to give herself to any man. [...] I found my key to this oeuvre in the theatrical text of Seneca. There Elektra asks Ägisth, the murderer of her father: What is worse than death? He replies: To live — if one desired to die.

— Johannes Erath, "Elektra" hat mit uns so unendlich viel zu tun, Kleine Zeitung, January 17, 2012

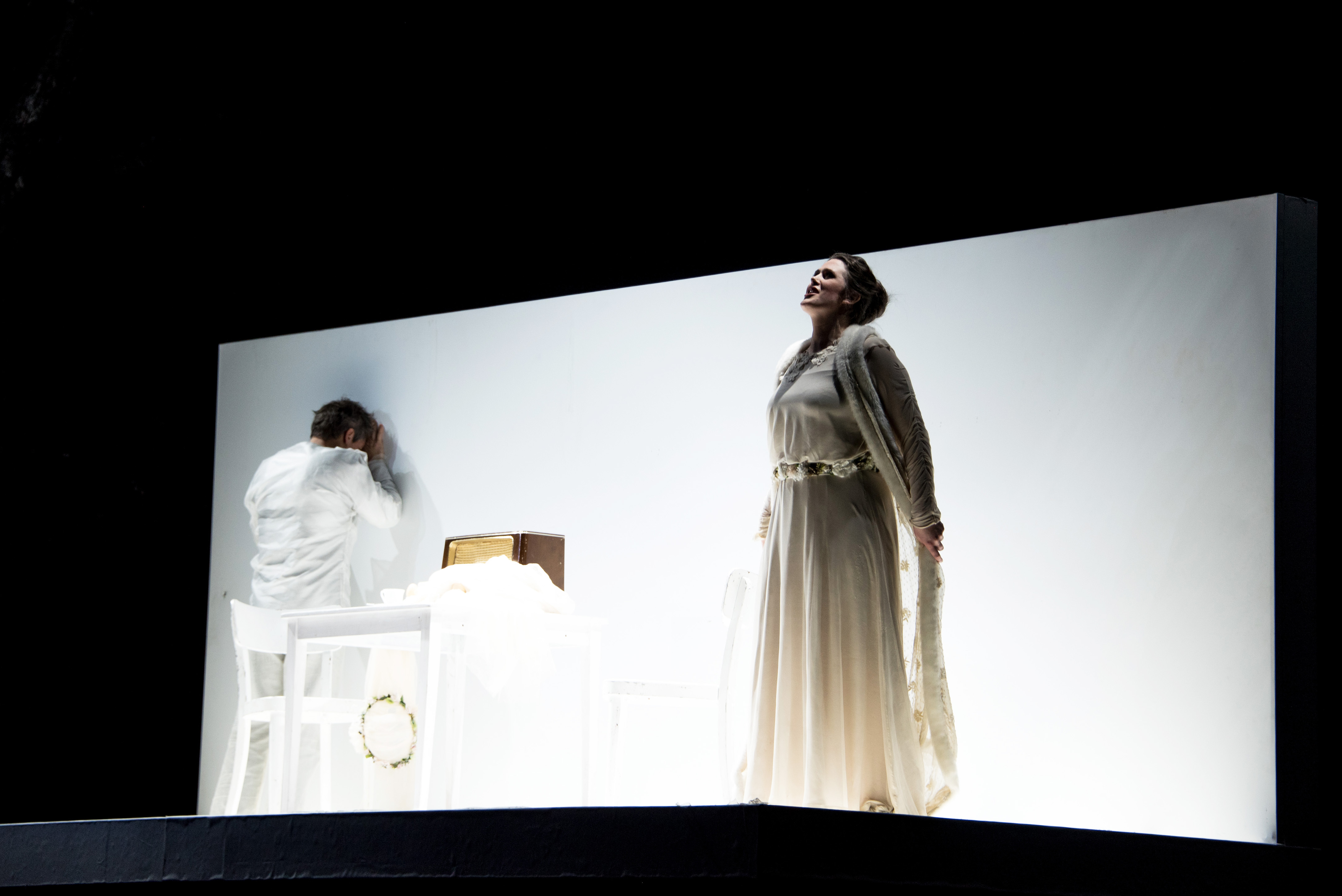
Lohengrin asked by Elsa about his name and descent, Oslo Opera 2015

[Lohengrin is] one of the few fairy tales without happy ending. ...He can not become a human being without losing his divinity. If one does not disclose himself, no love can emerge. Such a relationship can not work, it would explode sooner or later. Ortrud here functions more or less just as a catalyst. The constant question how much do we need to know about our partner and do we trust him is still asked today.

— Johannes Erath, "Lohengrin ist ein Märchen ohne Happy-End", Kleine Zeitung, September 14, 2013

== Accolades ==
- 2008 Götz Friedrich Preis for the production of Massenet's Cendrillon at the Stadttheater Bern
