= The Tenant (novel) =

Novel by Roland Topor

- Author: Roland Topor
- Original title: Le Locataire chimérique
- Language: French
- Genre: Novel
- Publication date: 1964
- Publication place: France

The Tenant (French: Le Locataire chimérique; in English The Chimeric Tenant) is a novel by Roland Topor, originally published in France in 1964. A film based on the book was directed by Roman Polanski in 1976. A surrealist horror novel, The Tenant was described by writer John Fowles as a book in "the Kafka tradition."

== Plot ==
The Tenant is the story of a Parisian of Polish descent, an exploration of alienation and identity, asking questions about how we define ourselves.

Trelkovsky, a Parisian man, has been thrown out on the street and desperately needs to find a place to live. He finds an affordable apartment, leased to a girl named Simone Choule, who is in a coma after a suicide attempt in which she jumped out of the windows, screaming. Choule dies, and Trelkovsky rents her old apartment. Trelkovsky soon falls prey to paranoid obsessions about his neighbors and dissociates, taking on Choule's identity. Ultimately, he too throws himself out the window. The book ends with Trelkovsky, like Choule before him, waking up in a coma.

== Editions ==
- The Tenant, translated by Francis K. Price, Centipede Press, Lakewood: CO, 2010, ISBN 978-1-933618-07-4
