= Roland Topor =

French writer, screenwriter, actor and painter

- Born: 7 January 1938; Paris, France
- Died: 16 April 1997 (aged 59); Paris, France
- Occupations: Illustrator, cartoonist, painter, playwright, designer, painter, animator, fiction writer, actor, film and TV script writer
- Writing career
- Period: 1964–1997
- Genres: Satire, Surrealism, Black comedy
- Notable work: The Tenant
- Literary movement: Panic Movement

Roland Topor (7 January 1938 – 16 April 1997) was a French illustrator, cartoonist, comics artist, painter, novelist, playwright, film and TV writer, filmmaker and actor, who was known for the surreal black comedy nature of his work. He was of Polish-Jewish origin. His parents were Jewish émigrés from Warsaw, Poland. He spent the early years of his life in Savoy, where his family hid him from the Gestapo.

== Biography ==
Roland Topor's parents came to France in the 1930s. In 1941 Topor's father, Abram, along with thousands of other Jewish men living in Paris, were required to register with the Vichy authorities. Topor's father was subsequently arrested and interned in a prison camp at Pithiviers, where inmates would be held before being sent to other concentration camps, usually Auschwitz. Of the thousands who were sent to Pithiviers only 159 survived. But Topor's father, Abram, managed to escape from Pithiviers and hide in an area south of Paris.

While his father was in hiding, Topor's landlady would confront the children, Topor and his older sister Hélène d'Almeida-Topor, and try to cajole them into giving away the location of their father. The landlady did not succeed. Then in May 1941 a neighbor tipped off the Topor family that the French police along with the Gestapo were going to search the entire building. So the family fled to Vichy France. In Savoy, four-year-old Roland Topor was placed in a French family, was given a false name, and took on the identity of a Catholic schoolboy.

The family survived, and in 1946 they sued the landlady to have their belongings returned, and to be allowed to resume living in their former apartment. The court ruled in their favor, they returned, and soon were once again paying rent to the landlady who had previously tried to have them apprehended.

The night before he died of a cerebral hemorrhage, it is reported that he couldn't sleep, and instead spent the night visiting Parisian cafes, enjoying Cuban cigars, and drinking Bordeaux wine. When he arrived at the Cafe de Flore, he recounted a nightmarish dream he experienced. It was a dream that he thought might inspire his next novel:

I'm awakened suddenly by a feeling of imminent disaster. Turning down the sheet, I discover a cadaver in my bed, the husk of a man of small stature, but fat, and of an age equal to mine. My first reflex is to jump to the telephone to warn the police. But I hesitate; the presence of this rotting carcass in my bed is embarrassing. Explanations will be demanded of me that I'll be incapable of furnishing. They'll suspect me of a crime that's abominable."

== Art ==
Roland Topor may be best known for his graphic works with their surrealist humor. He studied at the École des Beaux-Arts in Paris. His artworks have appeared in books, newspapers, posters, and film animations.

== Literature ==
Few of Topor's writings are available in English. His fictions are sometimes classed as "post-surrealist horror" that go beyond established limits, to portray carnivalesque worlds of bizarre situations, in which human realities that are normally unspoken are laid bare in confrontations with (using Topor's phrase) "le sang, la merde et le sexe" (blood, shit, and sex).

Roland Topor wrote the novel The Tenant (Le Locataire chimérique, 1964), which was adapted to film by Roman Polanski in 1976. The Tenant is the story of a Parisian of Polish descent, who develops an obsession regarding what has happened to his apartment's previous tenant. His 1969 novel Joko's Anniversary is a fable about loss of identity and is a satire on social conformity. Topor returned to these themes in his later novel Head-to-Toe Portrait of Suzanne (1978).

In 1965 David De Silva (Becca Productions Ltd) bought the film rights to The Tenant for $15,000 and sent the novel to Roman Polanski in the hope that he would consider directing it. De Silva made the mistake of phoning Polanski from New York around 7PM which would be just about midnight London time. He received Polanski's response to the project in a letter dated 4 May 1966. Subsequently, De Silva sold the rights to Universal Pictures because Edward Albee wanted to adapt it as his first screenplay under a three-picture deal with Universal but the deal never materialized. Polanski adapted the film 10 years later in 1976. De Silva believes Polanski never read the novel 10 years before. He says, "When the timing is right the timing is right.".

A new presentation of The Tenant by Roland Topor was released in October 2006. The book has Topor's original novel, a new introduction by Thomas Ligotti, a selection of short stories by Topor, a representation of Topor's artwork and an essay on the famous Roman Polanski film version.

Thomas Ligotti's introduction concerns the affirmative themes of world-renowned authors, focusing on Luigi Pirandello, with the negationist themes of Roland Topor's The Tenant.

In 2018, Atlas Press published Topor's Head-to-Toe Portrait of Suzanne, translated and introduced by Andrew Hodgson. It was the first of Topor's novels to enter English in nearly 50 years.

== Songs ==
Roland Topor wrote two songs for Megumi Satsu, "Je m'aime" and "Monte dans mon Ambulance".

== Cinema ==
With René Laloux, Topor made "The Dead Times" (Les Temps morts, 1964), "The Snails" (Les Escargots, 1965) and their most famous work, the feature-length animated science fiction film La Planète sauvage (1973).

Topor also worked as an actor, his most famous part being Renfield in Werner Herzog's Nosferatu: Phantom der Nacht (1979). In the same year, he also performed the surrealistic paralyzed boss in the movie Ratataplan by Maurizio Nichetti.

== Theatre ==
Topor variously wrote, directed and designed a number of theatre works. Topor's absurd narratives are rife with macabre ironies, scatologies, and cruelties, which seem intended to shock and reframe human interactions to an insane extent. When Topor's play Joko fête son anniversaire was performed in Brussels in 1972, one critic commented, "In some countries, the author would be shot." Topor's play Vinci avait raison (somewhat of a pastiche of J. B. Priestley's 1945 play An Inspector Calls) is set in a house where no one can escape, the toilets are clogged, and excrement becomes evident on stage. It was performed in Brussels in 1977 and caused a scandal. Critical responses include the suggestion, "We must put this idiot in prison for creating such filth."

His plays include:

- 1972 – Les derniers jours de solitude de Robinson Crusoé (The Last Lonely Days of Robinson Crusoe)
- 1972 – Le Bébé de Monsieur Laurent (Monsieur Laurent’s Baby)
- 1975 – De Moïse à Mao, 5000 ans d’aventures (From Moses to Mao, 5000 Adventurous Years)
- 1983 – Batailles (with Jean-Michel Ribes) (Battles)
- 1989 – Joko fête son anniversaire (Joko Celebrates his Birthday)
- 1989 – Vinci avait raison (Vinci was Right)
- 1994 – L'Hiver sous la table (Winter Under the Table)
- 1996 – L’Ambigu (Ambiguity)

== Chronology ==
Topor published several books of drawings, including Dessins panique (1965) Quatre roses pour Lucienne (1967) and Toporland (1975). Selections from Quatre roses pour Lucienne were reprinted in the English language collection Stories and Drawings (1967). His carefully detailed, realistic style, with elaborate crosshatching, emphasises the fantastic and macabre subject matter of the images.

- 1962 – Creates the Panic Movement (Mouvement panique), together with Alejandro Jodorowsky and Fernando Arrabal.
- 1961 to 1965 – Contributes to French satirical magazine Hara-Kiri.
- 1965 – Creates, with partner René Laloux, the animated short film Les Escargots ("The Snails"). The film won Special Jury Prize at the Cracow Film Festival.
- 1966 – Illustrates Daniel Spoerri's An Anecdoted Topography of Chance (Re-Anecdoted Version), published by the Something Else Press. Also illustrates Melvin Van Peebles' Le Chinois du XIV.
- 1971 – Creates the drawings for the bizarre introduction of Fernando Arrabal's film Viva la muerte.
- 1973 – Topor designs and René Laloux directs La Planète sauvage, a 72-minute-long animated film, based on a novel by Stefan Wul.
- 1974 – Topor has a cameo in Dusan Makavejev's Sweet Movie.
- 1975 – Illustrates Patricia Highsmith's Kleine Geschichtgen für Weiberfeinde, published by Diogenes Verlag. Published in English in 1977 by Heinemann as Little Tales of Misogyny.
- 1976 – Roman Polanski directs a film version of Topor's book The Tenant.
- 1979 – Plays the role of Renfield in Werner Herzog's film Nosferatu the Vampyre.
- 1983 – Creates with Henri Xhonneux the popular French television series Téléchat, a parody of news broadcasts featuring puppets of a cat and an ostrich.
- 1989 – With Henri Xhonneux co-writes the screenplay for the film Marquis, loosely based on the life and writings of Marquis de Sade. The cast consisted of actors in period costumes with animal masks, with a separate puppet for de Sade's anthropomorphised "bodily appendage."
- 2011 – The Ian Potter Museum of Art at the University of Melbourne mounted a survey exhibition of 22 promotional posters designed by Roland Topor.

== Bibliography ==
In 2010, the French publishing company United Dead Artists founded by Stéphane Blanquet published an oversized book "ReBonjour" on the work of Topor.
