= Musica viva (Munich) =

Concert series in Germany

musica viva is a concert series of contemporary music, founded in Munich in 1945 by Karl Amadeus Hartmann. It has been run by the broadcaster Bayerischer Rundfunk from 1948. It is focused on orchestral music, performed at the Herkulessaal of the Münchner Residenz, but also features multi-media events and studio concerts at venues such as the Muffatwerk culture centre, churches in Munich, the Marstall theatre and the Gasteig.

It has been regarded as a leading series of contemporary music, along with the Donaueschinger Musiktage, the Darmstädter Ferienkurse and the Wittener Tage für neue Kammermusik.

== Artistic directors ==
The festival was directed by:

- 1945–1963: Karl Amadeus Hartmann
- 1963–1978: Wolfgang Fortner
- 1978–1997: Jürgen Meyer-Josten
- 1997–2011: Udo Zimmermann
- from 2011: Winrich Hopp
