= Jon Konigshofer =

American architect (1906–1990)

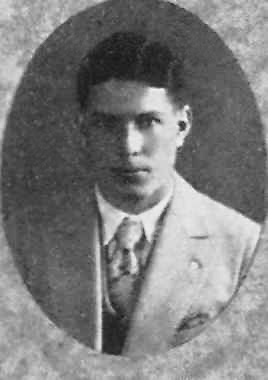
- Konigshofer in 1926
- Born: Julius Jon Konigshofer; January 13, 1906; Alameda, California, U.S.
- Died: 13 October 1990 (aged 84); Monterey, California, U.S.
- Education: University of Oregon
- Occupation: unlicensed architect
- Style: Modern architecture
- Spouses: Frances Wardner Mansfield (m. 1938; died 1964) Beryl Scott (m. 1966)
- Children: 1
- Military career
- Allegiance: United States of America
- Branch: United States Navy
- Service years: 1940s
- Rank: Lieutenant

Jon Konigshofer (January 13, 1906 – October 13, 1990) was a house designer and builder who was never licensed as an architect, but known for his minimalist low cost homes, primarily built in the Monterey Peninsula. He also designed homes and commercial buildings in other areas of California and Mexico.

== Early life and education ==
Konigshofer was born on January 13, 1906, in Alameda, California to Leon and Etta Konigshofer. A World War II veteran, he served as a U.S. Naval lieutenant commander during five major actions in the Pacific Theater. He was married to Beryl Konigshofer.

== Career ==
Konigshofer was a house designer without an architect's license who designed minimalist and affordable buildings on the Monterey Peninsula which used cheap materials.

In 1937, Konigshofer moved to the art colony at Carmel-by-the-Sea, California, working in the office of master builder Michael J. Murphy as a designer. He then left to start his own firm. During this time he built traditional architectural homes that were in demand in Carmel during the early 20th-century. His first house design, created in 1938, was a ranch-style home for J.D. Greenan, overlooking Mission Fields. He did extensive work in Pebble Beach, including designing Bing Crosby's house in 1941. In 1940, Konigshofer designed the Etta Stackpole House, situated on Ocean and El Camino in Carmel-by-the-Sea, using early traditional Vernacular-style work before adopting the modernist design.

In 1941, Konigshofer redesigned the Pine Inn's restaurant dining room and the La Playa Hotel. Landscape architect Thomas Church and Konigshofer worked on Monterey Peninsula projects together from the 1940s to the 1950s, such as the Carmel's Mayfair Apartments (1941), and Robert Buckner's Pebble Beach house (1947). The January 1947, Sunset Magazine featured one of Konigshofer's five Mayfair studio apartments with photographs of the floorplan, exterior covered walkway, and interior with corner fireplace.

Konigshofer was not licensed or formally educated in architecture, yet the Herald observed that his buildings "attracted as much comment and praise in the architectural world as those designed by many a high-ranking degreed architect." Frank Lloyd Wright hired Konigshofer to oversee the construction of Hollywood producer John Nesbitt's House at Cypress Point, Pebble Beach, California. The plans were completed in 1940 but not executed.

In 1941, Konigshofer designed the Sand and Sea complex, consisting of five residences and a garage with an upstairs studio. This complex blends elements of West Coast regionalism and Bay Area Tradition modernistic styles. The January 1947, Sunset Magazine featured one of the five houses with photographs of the floor design, exterior redwood siding, and interior with high ceilings.

Konigshofer built a modern circular one-story house for film producer Robert Buckner in 1947 in Pebble Beach. Its design included eaves for shading and a concrete patio that wrapped around much of the structure. This residence appeared in an advertisement for Kimsul Blanket Insulation, manufactured by the Kimberly-Clark. In a published letter within the advertisement, Konigshofer expressed his aim to demonstrate that cost-effective homes could be swiftly constructed while maintaining an appealing design. The Robert Buckner residence was among fifty-three houses showcased in the 1949 San Francisco Museum of Modern Art exhibition, titled "Domestic Architecture of the San Francisco Bay Region." It was also featured in Architectural Forum with photographs of the semicircular layout, floorpan, and interiors. In the January 1949 issue of House Beautiful, the house was described as "born of open-mindedness" and envisioned as a testing ground for new ideas on human shelter.

In 1948, Konigshofer designed a two-story for Carmel mayor Keith Evans at 2969 Franciscan Way in Carmel. The "Hillside House" was featured in Life magazine on March 17, 1952, and in House Beautiful in January 1950. He used modern prefabricate materials on a hillside lot and is as an example of affordable residential housing under $10,000 (equivalent to $121,241 in 2025). The Keith Evans house is an example of the Bay Area Tradition architectural style.

== Death ==
Konigshofer died of cancer on October 13, 1990, in Monterey, California.
