= Miriam Michelson =

American journalist

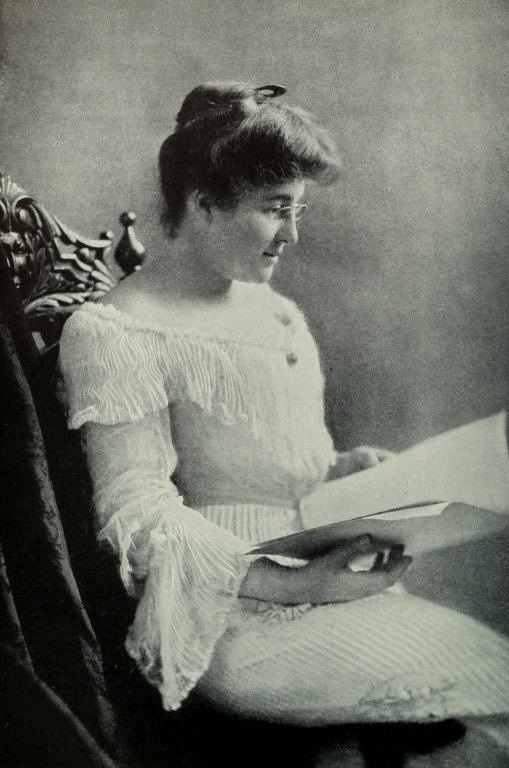
- Born: Calaveras, California
- Occupations: Novelist, journalist
- Writing career
- Subject: Literature

Miriam Michelson (1870–1942) was an American journalist and writer.

== Biography ==
Miriam Michelson was born in the mining town Murphy's Camp in Calaveras, California, in 1870. She was the seventh of eight children of Samuel and Rosalie (née Przylubska) Michelson, who immigrated to the United States from Poland in 1855 after fleeing Strzelno to evade anti-Semitic persecution. Eventually, her parents moved west to Virginia City, Nevada where Michelson and her siblings were raised. Her parents were successful merchants who sold supplies to miners in the midst of the Gold Rush. Her oldest brother, physicist Albert A. Michelson, was the first American citizen to win a Nobel Prize for science; and the youngest, journalist Charles Michelson, became a close assistant to Franklin D. Roosevelt. Michelson began her writing career in 1895–1902 by writing journalism. She worked as a reporter for the San Francisco Call and San Francisco Bulletin and later, in Philadelphia, for the North American. The topics of her articles included race, gender relations, cross-ethnic relations, ethno-religious identity, nationalism, and imperialism. She was known for supporting suffrage causes and addressing gender and political issues in her work. An example of such writing is her review of Charlotte Perkins Stetson's sociological study of gender and power relations in Women and Economics (1898). In her review, Michelson's lighthearted and conversational tone of writing allow her to praise Women and Economics while also educating her readers that Charlotte Perkins Stetson's “radical views” were likely to provoke the male audience regarding gender relations. Charlotte Perkins Stetson's study would eventually become a declaration for the first-wave women's movement and Michelson's review of Charlotte Perkins Stetson's study would bring publicity to the matter. Beginning in 1904, she began concentrating on fiction-writing. Michelson died on May 28, 1942.

== Career and literary works ==
Michelson maintained a 40-year career as a writer. She spent the beginning of her career as a journalist for the San Francisco Call. Her work as a journalist was quite notable, especially considering she wrote in the 1800s, a time when women of her profession were usually limited to Society reporting. The Women's Page section often consisted of content aimed toward the stereotypical American housewife, such as fashion, food, etc., but Michelson's work subverted the gender norms of her career and era by covering topics such as crime and politics. Michelson's newspaper writing began in 1895 with Arthur McEwen’s Letter. Her articles were featured as a part of San Francisco's top daily newspapers (i.e., San Francisco Bulletin and San Francisco Call) and Philadelphia's North American. Michelson mainly addressed gender relations, but she also wrote about progressive culture. Topics on progressive culture included critiques about imperialism, racism, temperance, suffrage, and debates about women's education, voting, and marriage status. When Michelson moved from the Call to the Bulletin in 1898, she was assigned to what she called “the Chinatown detail”. Michelson was a part of a team of reporters covering the corruption in San Francisco's Chinatown in California more broadly, which was controlled by the Southern Pacific Railroad.

In the Bishop's Carriage

Subsequent to her profession as a journalist, Michelson pursued a career as a writer of fiction. The first chapter of In the Bishop’s Carriage appeared as a short story in Ainslee's Magazine in 1903; afterward she was approached by the Bobbs-Merrill Company with an offer to expand and publish it as a full-length novel, which was released in 1904, with illustrations by Harrison Fisher and cover design by Margaret Armstrong. Although this was the first of Michelson's many novels, her literary talent is evident in the novel's immediate popularity. The style of her novels was progressive, as the settings of the novels take place in Michelson's time, but her characters challenged the way in which women's roles were viewed by exploring female victimhood and agency. In the Bishop's Carriage inspired a play by Channing Pollock and two Hollywood films; one was also titled In the Bishop's Carriage (1913) and starred Mary Pickford, and the other was retitled She Couldn't Help It (1920) and starred Bebe Daniels. Michelson's success as a writer stemmed from her ability to create bold and interesting female protagonists who were not restricted by gender conventions. In the Bishop’s Carriage is no exception in that the novel revolves around a female protagonist placed in the unconventional role of a pick-pocket. Michelson's characters often reflect her own qualities and values. Her characters do not allow their gender to place limits on who they are or what they do professionally. Michelson's characters often break traditional and stereotypical roles for women in that they are not housewives or submissive to a male protagonist but rather are characters who are independent with bold attitudes and mannerisms.

A Yellow Journalist

Another of Michelson's better-known works of fiction is A Yellow Journalist, published in 1905. The novel features another unconventional character that closely resembles Michelson. The protagonist, a successful female reporter, breaks gender constraints within journalism just like Michelson. The novel was published as part of a collection of stories in the Saturday Evening Post, an iconic American weekly magazine.

Other notable works

Michelson published several other books including:

- Anthony Overman (1906), a romance involving a pure-minded reformist and determined female reporter
- The Awakening of Zojas (1910), a collection of four novellas, including a science fiction story
- Petticoat King (1929), a work of historical fiction about Queen Elizabeth I
- The Wonderlode of Silver and Gold (1934), which was non-fiction and Michelson's final book

Although these works were not nearly as popular as In a Bishop's Carriage and A Yellow Journalist, they demonstrated her ability to sense the social realities at the time. Her use of female characters reveals Michelson's own journalistic experiences that required her to challenge gender stereotypes, women's roles in politics and society, and the responsibility of women in a professional setting such as journalism.

== Popularity ==
Merging her skills in newspaper journalism and fiction-writing contributed to Michelson's success as a writer. Her writing is characterized by creativity in formulating quick-paced plots, using slang in character dialogue, and featuring young female characters as heroines. She also employed the first-person in her articles, reminding the audience of her role as a reporter and the sympathetic subjectivity she acknowledged as an “outsider” to the events and stories she experienced. Michelson's presence as a journalist was emphasized by her name appearing in many headlines and bylines of her work, despite most published newspaper articles at the time going unsigned by the author.

Michelson's journalism and writing were media that enabled her to express the growing presence of women's involvement in the political sphere. Michelson helped to promote the activism of suffragist leaders (e.g., Susan B. Anthony and Charlotte Perkins Stetson) by writing about their activism. She also wrote about progressive issues ranging from the prejudices experienced by black soldiers in the Spanish–American War to conditions at Indian boarding schools. She knew how to draw in her audience in by using a light-hearted approach when addressing women's issues. In effect, writing about the diversity of women's experiences in a vivid and entertaining style appealed to a broad range of audiences, but her articles especially appealed to the young, independent-minded women trying to make it in male-dominated professional environments.

== Absence from scholarly discourse ==
Michelson's celebrity was gained through her work and literary techniques as a journalist, yet these achievements were not deemed worthy of preservation. The emotional and strategic effects of her writing, its documentation of racial and ethnic diversity, and passion for championing societal prejudices were not considered sophisticated. Renowned critics such as H. L. Mencken admired the literary prowess of Michelson's plots in novels such as Michael Thwaite’s Wife, but he dismissed her work as a “literary joy ride,” as he failed to recognize the complex feminist tone of the writing. Although her work remains in obscurity, her popularity and success at the time suggest that women/writers’ voices were not silenced to the same degree as Michelson's literary fore-mothers had been. That is, minority writers such as Michelson were given a voice by publishers because the topic of suffrage would sell newspapers and even novels at that particular time. Michelson's work in both fiction and non-fiction gave her the platform she needed to address a progressive mindset that was not limited to suffrage, exposing women's political and social issues such as prejudice against the merits of “a single life and an independent career”, and the economic status of housewives.

== Works ==
- (1904). In the Bishop's Carriage, Bobbs-Merrill Company.
- (1904). The Madigans, The Century Co.
- (1905). Yellow Journalist, D. Appleton and Company.
- (1906). Anthony Overman, Doubleday, Page & Company.
- (1909). Michael Thwaites's Wife, Doubleday, Page & Company.
- (1910). The Awakening of Zojas, Doubleday, Page & Company.
- (1934). The Wonderlode of Silver and Gold, The Stratford Company.

Short stories

- "Fayal, the Unforgiving," The Smart Set, Vol. X, No. 3, 1903.
- "The Contumacy of Sarah L. Walker." In The Spinner's Book of Fiction, Paul Elder & Company, 1907.

Articles

- "Many Thousands of Native Hawaiians Sign a Protest to the United States Government Against Annexation" The San Francisco Call, September 22, 1897
- "The Destruction of San Francisco," Harper's Weekly, May 5, 1906.
- "Vice and the Woman's Vote," Sunset, Vol. XXX, April 1913.

Other

- "The Ways of Dorothy," East & West, Vol. I, November 1899/October 1900.
