= She Couldn't Help It =

1920 silent drama film directed by Maurice Campbell

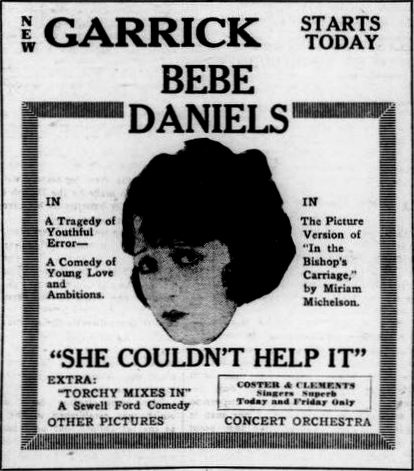
- Newspaper advertisement
- Directed by: Maurice Campbell
- Written by: Channing Pollock; Douglas Bronston (scenario)
- Based on: In the Bishop’s Carriage by Miriam Michelson
- Produced by: Adolph Zukor
- Starring: Bebe Daniels
- Cinematography: H. Kinley Martin
- Production company: Realart Pictures Corporation
- Distributed by: Realart Pictures Corporation
- Release date: December 1920
- Running time: Feature length
- Country: United States
- Language: Silent (English intertitles)

She Couldn't Help It is a lost 1920 American silent comedy-drama and romance film directed by Maurice Campbell and starring Bebe Daniels. The story is based on the novel In the Bishop’s Carriage by Miriam Michelson and play of the same name by Channing Pollock.

The novel and play were previously filmed in 1913 as In the Bishop's Carriage starring Mary Pickford.

== Cast ==
- Bebe Daniels as Young Nance Olden
- Emory Johnson as William Lattimer
- Wade Boteler as Tom Dorgan
- Vera Lewis as Mother Hogan
- Herbert Standing as Bishop Van Wagenen
- Z. Wall Covington as Mr. Ramsey
- Helen Raymond as Mrs. Ramsey
- Ruth Renick as Nellie Ramsey
- Gertrude Short as Mag Monahan
- Milla Davenport as Matron
