= Fanie Eloff =

South African sculptor

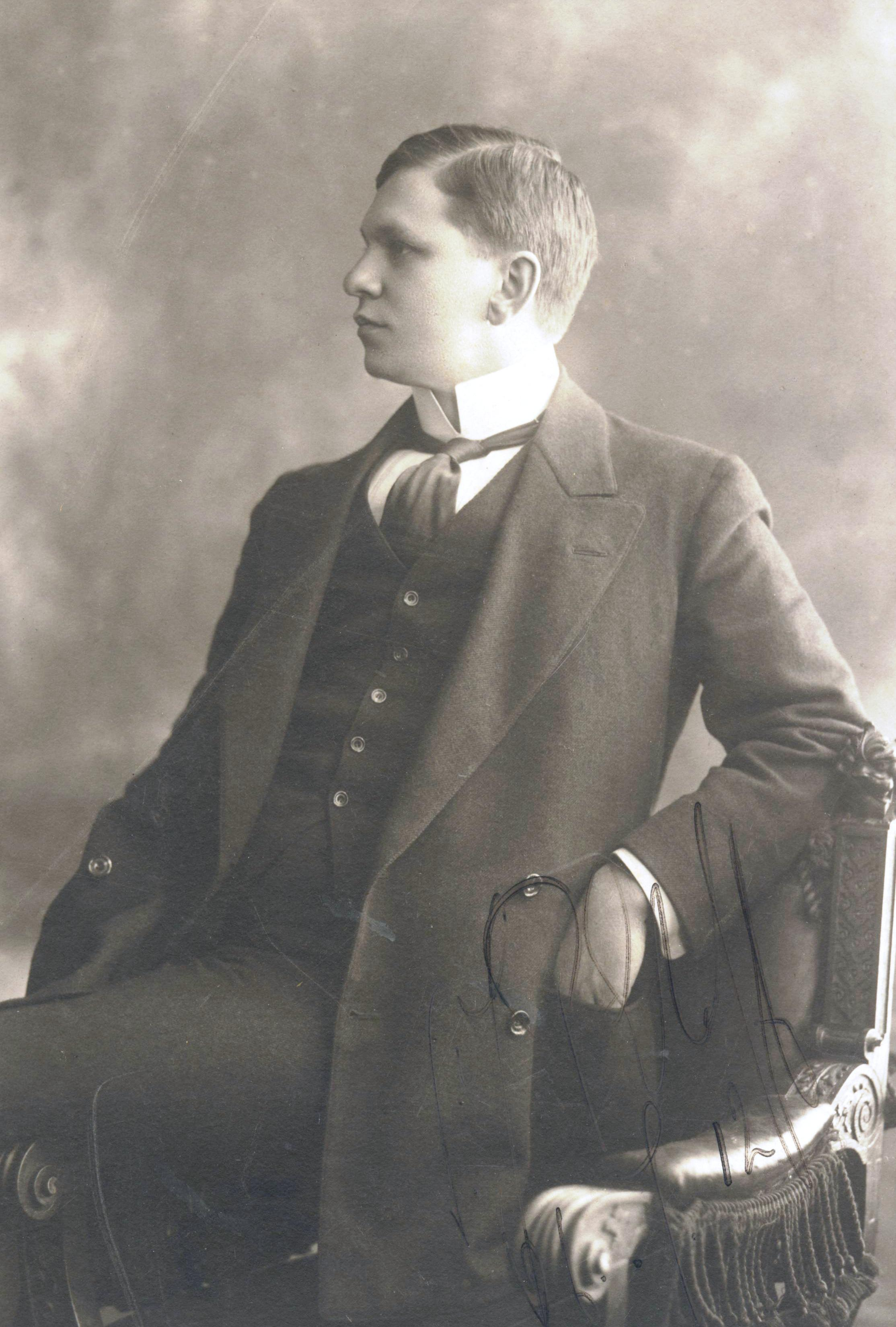
- Fanie Eloff in Paris, 16 July 1912
- Born: Stephanus Johannes Paulus Eloff; 7 October 1885; Pretoria
- Died: 20 November 1947 (aged 62); Pretoria
- Education: Staatsmodelschool; Johannesburg School of Mines; University of Paris; Jardin des Plantes; Peter David Edstrom
- Known for: sculpture
- Notable work: Spirit of Sport, Pilditch Stadium; Koos de la Rey, Lichtenburg Cemetery; Boxer, University of Pretoria
- Movement: Impressionism
- Awards: Honorary Membership Société Nationale des Beaux-Arts, 1912; Medal of Honour: South African Academy of Science & Art, 1945

Fanie Eloff (1885-1947) was a South African sculptor.

Stephanus Johannes Paulus Eloff was born as the sixth child and second son of Frederik Christoffel Eloff and Elsie Francina Eloff (née Kruger). They lived right next to his grandfather, President Paul Kruger of the Zuid Afrikaanse Republiek on church street in Pretoria.

Eloff along with other influential South African Artists like Jacobus Hendrik Pierneef, Gerard Moerdijk and Gordon Leith attended the Staats Model School in Pretoria until the outbreak of the Anglo Boer War (1899-1902). The Eloff family followed Paul Kruger into exile in Switzerland after the fall of Pretoria on 3 September 1900. After the death of Kruger in 1904 the Eloff's moved back to Pretoria and Fanie Eloff completed his schooling. He enrolled at the South African School of Mines in Johannesburg for a course in geology.

In 1908, Fanie decided to further his studies in Europe, at the Sorbonne University in Paris. After a short time in Paris he was so inspired by the sculpture of the city that he decided to follow this as a career. He firstly enrolled for an Anatomy course at the Jardin Des Plantes and Eloff received his first sculpture classes at the art school of Peter David Edstrom, in Paris.

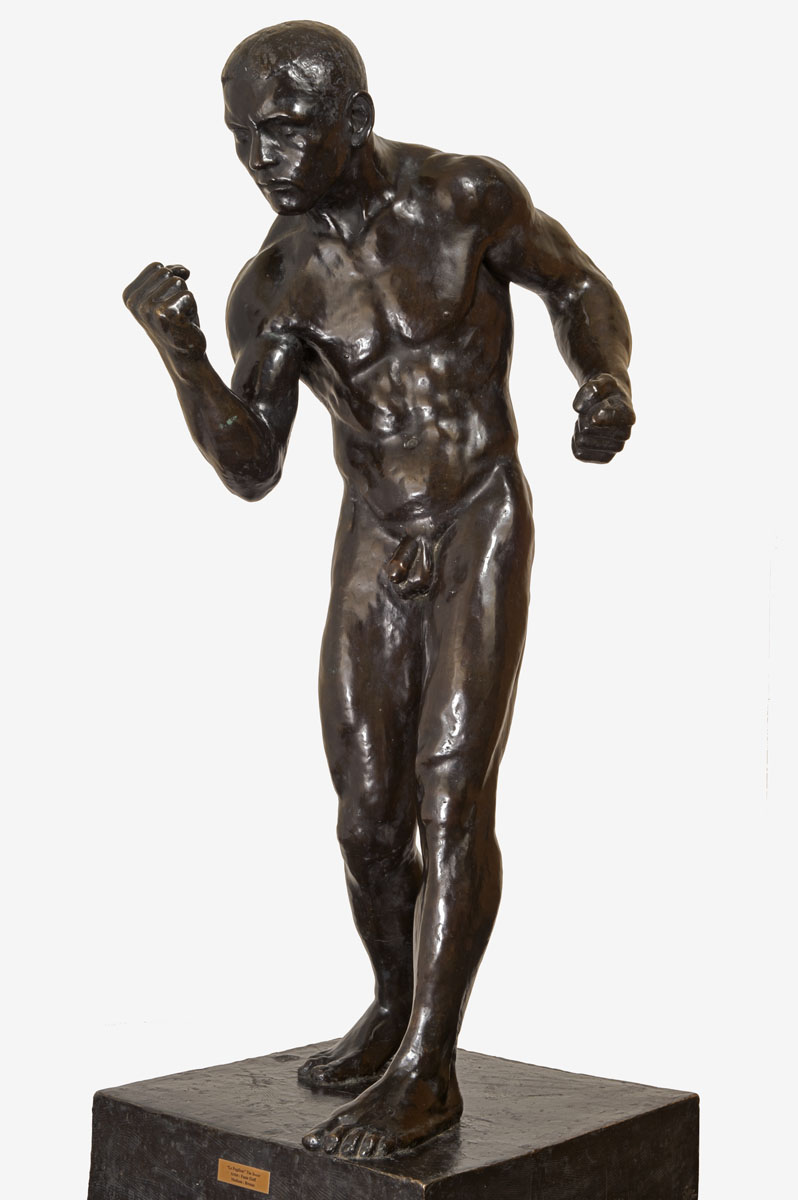
Boxer by Fanie Eloff, Bronze (1912) 1050mm high

In 1912 he took part in the 130 De Salon, Grand Palais des Champs-Élysées and created his work titled the Boxer. After the acclaim this work received in the press, locally and abroad he was admitted to Union Internationale des Beaux-Arts et des Lettres. With the outbreak of the First World War (1914-1919), his parents persuaded him to return to South Africa and in 1922 he returned to Paris. In 1924 he entered 2 sculptures in the Olympic Games in Paris of which Boxer was one.

Through his love of all art he came to love Ballet and the performing arts, and became friends with a lot of dancers. He ‘contracted’ a lot of the dancers to pose for him and became known for his dancing nudes. With the invasion of Paris during the Second World War (1939-1945) Fanie had to flee and he returned to South Africa. In 1945, South African Academy of Science & Art, awarded Fanie with the Medal of Honour for art. His health gradually deteriorated during this time, and as a result his productivity reduced. He died during emergency surgery at the General Hospital in Pretoria. His entire estate, including the contents of his studio in Paris, was put on public auction in 1948. Fanie Eloff is buried in the Rebecca street cemetery in Pretoria West.

== Exhibitions ==
1912 - Individualist exhibition - Pretoria City Hall
1929 - Eloff and Pierneef joint exhibition - Jewish Guild Hall, Johannesburg
1941 - Eloff and Pierneef joint exhibition - Pierneef's House Elangeni, Pretoria
1948 - Auction exhibition - Christie's Gallery, Johanneburg
2011 - Overview exhibition - Mapungubwe Museum, University of Pretoria

== Sculptures ==
At the moment 102 works of Fanie Eloff are known. Of these works several are in the collections of foremost institutions like the Pretoria Art Museum, University of Pretoria, Centre Georges Pompidou, Ditsong National Museum of Cultural History, Ditsong Kruger House Museum, National Gallery in Cape town and the South African Academy of Science & Art.

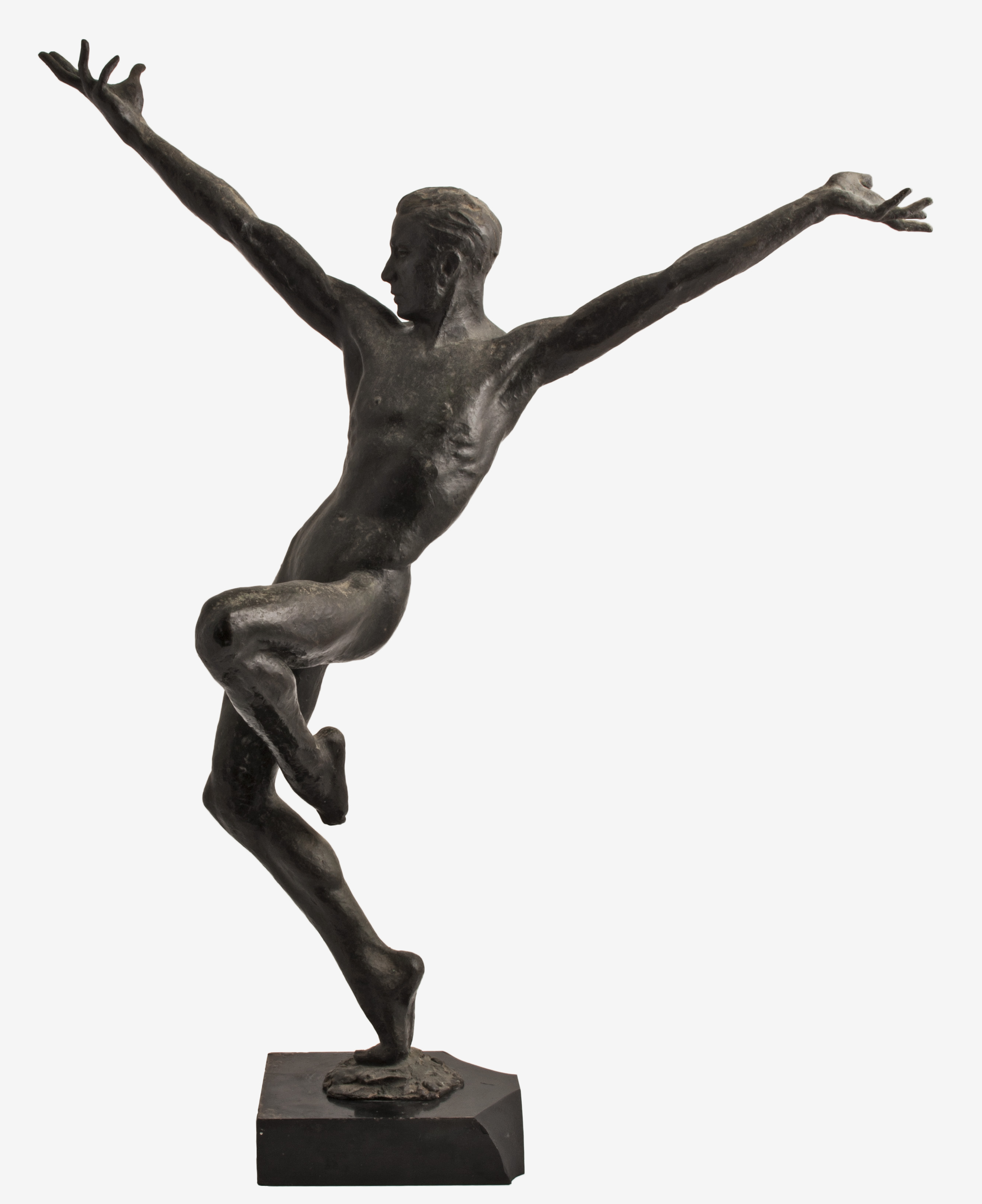
Rhapsody by Fanie Eloff, Bronze (1935) 820mm high

Several of his works are on public display. The Spirit of Sport at the Pilditch Stadium, His parents' gravestone in the Pretoria West Cemetery The grave stone of Koos de la Rey in Lichtenburg (Stolen from the cemetery in April 2021) and the bronze pots in the forecourt of the Union Buildings.
