= Chris Jorgensen =

American painter (1860-1935)

Coordinates: 37.7486°N 119.5880°W

Christian August Jorgensen
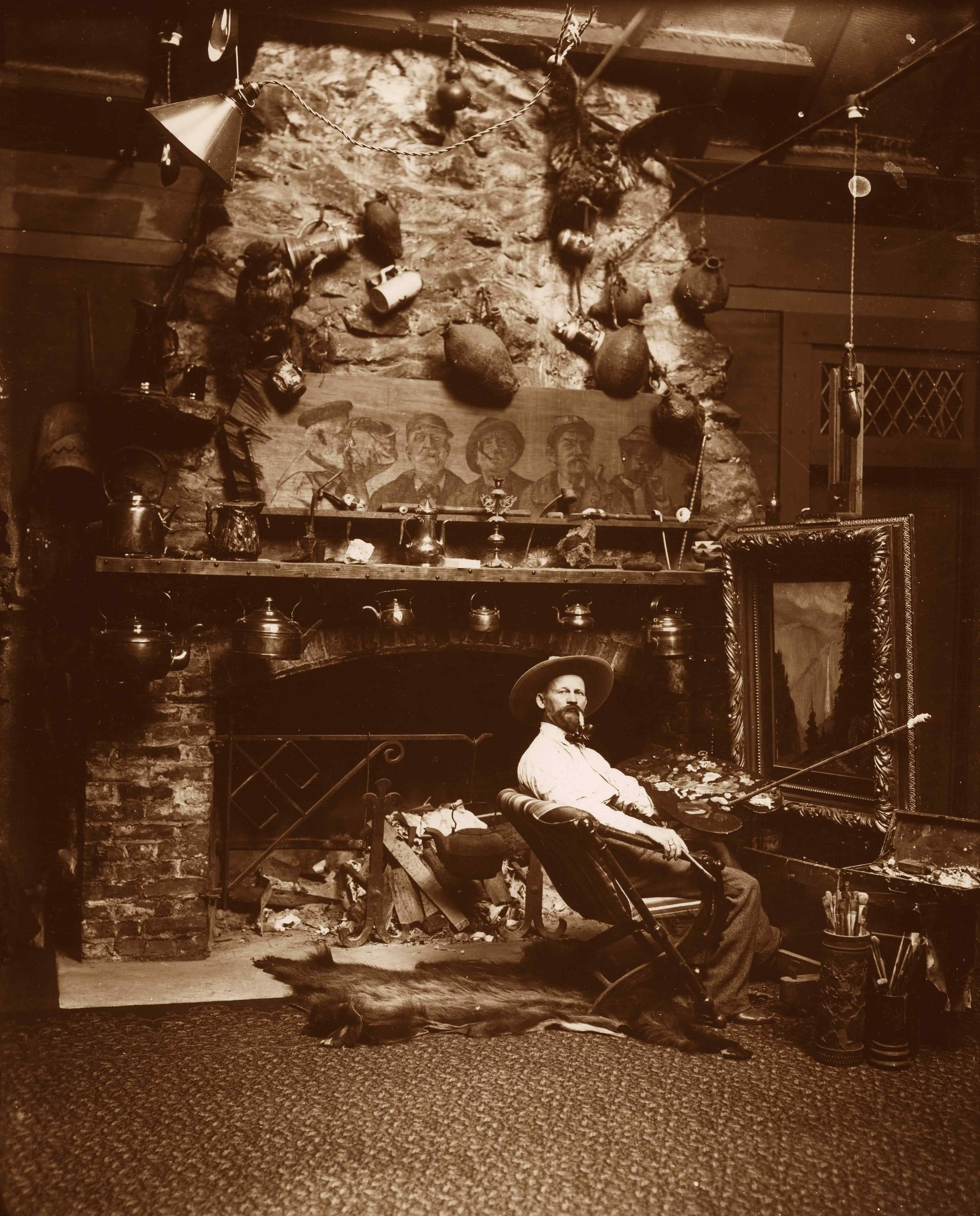
- Jorgensen inside his Studio in Yosemite National Park
- Born: October 7, 1860; Oslo, Norway
- Died: June 24, 1935 (aged 74); Piedmont, California, US
- Occupation: landscape painter
- Spouse: Angela Ghirardelli

Christian August Jorgensen (October 7, 1860 - June 24, 1935) was a Norwegian-born American landscape painter. Jorgensen is best known for his paintings of Yosemite Valley and the California Missions.

== Early life and influences ==
Chris Jorgensen was born in Oslo, Norway in 1860, to parents Ole and Sophie Jorgensen. Ole Jorgensen died of tuberculosis in 1864, leaving his wife to care for Chris and his four older siblings. In 1870 Sophie immigrated to the United States to reunite with her brother in San Francisco, California.

Jorgensen met his future mentor Virgil Williams shortly before the San Francisco School of Design opened in February 1874. Williams, the director of this academy, spotted the young fourteen-year-old Jorgensen sketching near his residence in the city and invited him to be the first free student. Williams' influence over Jorgensen's budding artistic style was great. As Williams had been exposed to French and Italian methods of painting in his travels abroad, he emphasized the importance of regular exhibition to the young Jorgensen. Jorgensen's lifelong tendency towards classical compositions arose from Williams’ mentorship.

Another influential mentor of Jorgensen's was Thomas Hill, a highly successful California artist during the late 19th century. From Hill, Jorgensen developed a more impressionistic technique and learned to intensify the colors in his works by coating them in a heavy glaze.

At the end of his course at the School of Design in 1881, Williams appointed Jorgensen an instructor and the Assistant Director of the School. It was in this period that Jorgensen had the good fortune to fall in love with and marry one of his art students in 1888, Angela Ghirardelli, heiress to the Ghirardelli fortune.

== Yosemite period ==
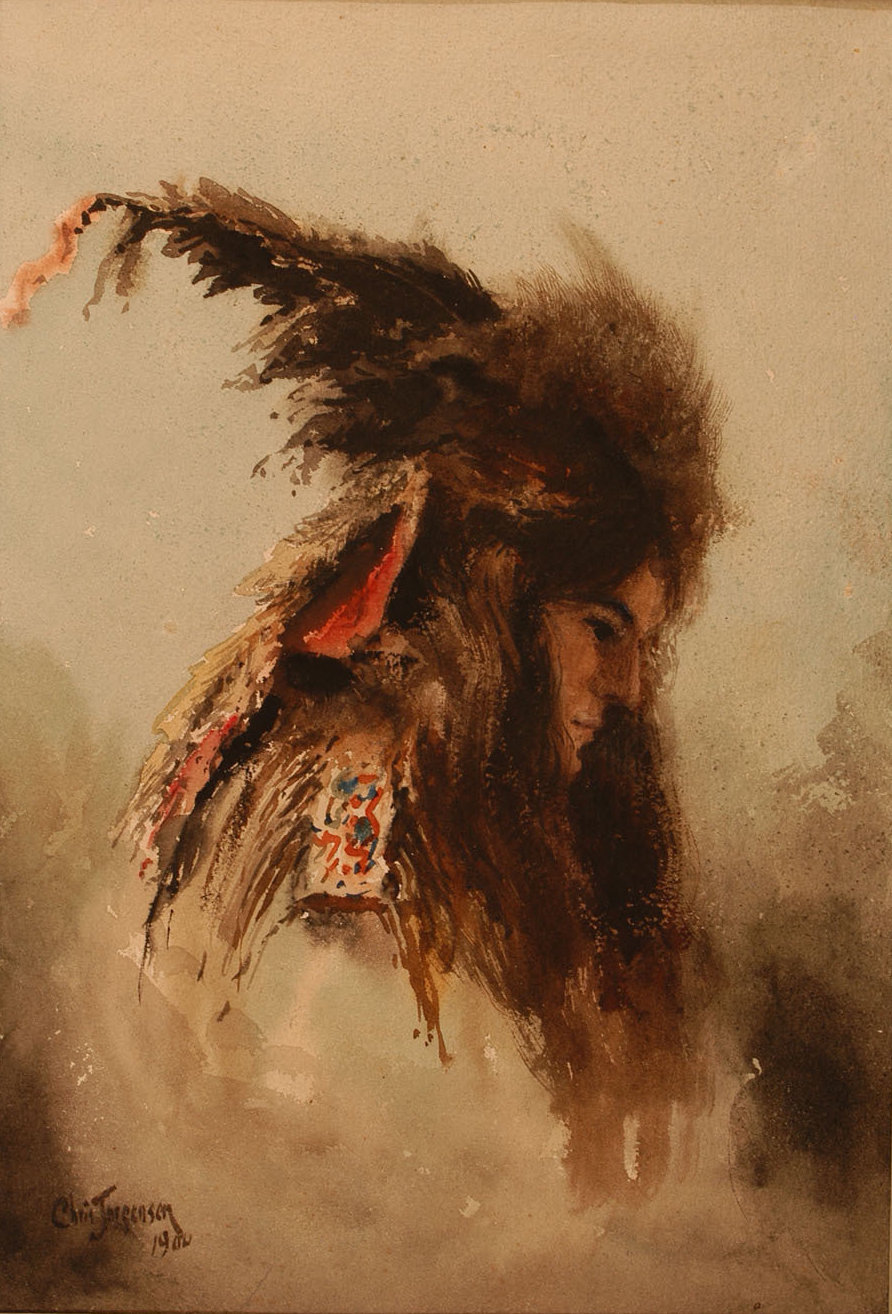
Indian Head, Watercolor, 1900

Influenced by the travels of Thomas Hill, Virgil Williams and Albert Bierstadt, Jorgensen decided to visit the famed Yosemite Valley in 1898. Two years later, the artist submitted an application to the Yosemite Commission for permission to construct a studio in the valley itself on July 12, 1900. The commission granted their permission for an initial four-year lease which was repeatedly extended. Not only did the commission wish to promote Yosemite's beauty by having a popular artist in residence, but they also had the intention of eventually taking over use of the structure when Jorgensen's lease expired. Jorgensen constructed his home for a total of $5,000 and lived there during the summers and some winters from 1900 to 1917. At the time of the artist's occupation, the house's living room was described by the San Francisco Chronicle (February 17, 1901) as one of the “most unique and artistic studios on the coast” containing all manner of objects from skins and baskets to beer steins and water buffalo horns.

Jorgensen and his wife Angela donated many Native American baskets to the Yosemite Museum between 1922 and 1929 and many of Jorgensen's works came to the Museum as a bequest from Angelina Jorgensen after her death.

== Later life ==
In 1905 the Jorgensens settled in Carmel-by-the-Sea, California, and built a mansion, which they used as a winter studio. He designed and built a two-story wood-framed, ell shaped stone mansion as a gift to his wife, Angela. The original part of the building had a 25-foot stone tower with a quatrefoil window, that was used as his art studio. It was designed by Jorgensen and built by master stonemason Ben Turner. The property had the first swimming pool in Carmel. The house still exists today as the La Playa Hotel on Camino Real and 8th Avenue.

His Yosemite studio became the first museum in Yosemite Valley in 1922 although it was later dismantled. In 1917 when the Jorgensens left Yosemite, they decided to live permanently in Piedmont, California, in order to remain closer to the Ghirardelli family.

== Death ==
Jorgensen died on June 24, 1935, from a heart attack. His wife lived only several months after him.

== Works ==
Jorgensen was an unusual artist in the sense that he often chose to paint in watercolor, a medium that was still viewed as inferior to oil painting at this time. However, Jorgensen was more successful in the medium of watercolor than in oil. His style of careful delineation in the foreground and distinct foggy washes in the horizon appears charming in a transparent medium but more primitive in heavier oils. Watercolor also lent itself well to his habit of painting en plein air. During his career as an artist, Jorgensen was successfully received and made a tidy profit selling his paintings both in Yosemite and San Francisco.

Early Works

- Tug Favorite, pencil and chalk on paper, 1880
- House and Tree, watercolor on paper, 1883

Selected Oil Paintings

- Vernal and Nevada Falls, 1903
- Lena Brown and Child, 1905
- Yosemite, 1906
- Trail in High Sierra, 1909
- Mariposa Grove, Two Sequoias, 1910

Selected Watercolor Paintings

- Wawona
- Minarets in Yosemite
- Mariposa Grove
- Happy Isles
- Mariposa Grove. Base of Sequoia gigantea
- Yosemite Falls and Overhanging Rock
- Half Dome from the North
