= In the Bishop's Carriage =

1913 American silent drama film

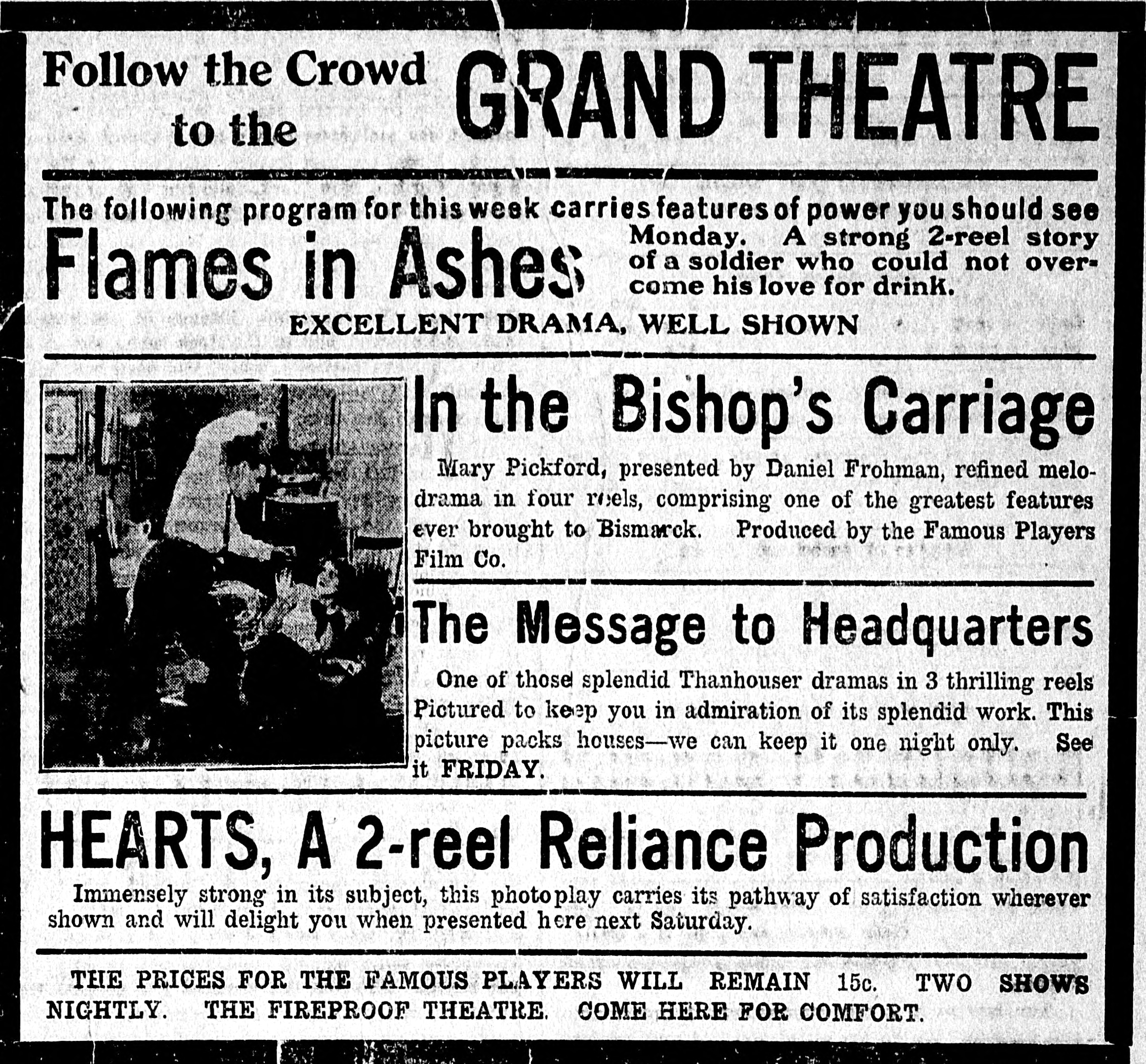
- Newspaper advertisement
- Directed by: J. Searle Dawley; Edwin S. Porter
- Written by: Channing Pollock; B. P. Schulberg (scenario)
- Based on: In the Bishop's Carriage by Miriam Michelson
- Produced by: Adolph Zukor
- Starring: Mary Pickford
- Cinematography: H. Lyman Broening
- Production company: Famous Players Film Company
- Distributed by: Famous Players Film Company (State's Rights)
- Release date: September 10, 1913
- Running time: 4 reels
- Country: United States
- Language: Silent (English intertitles)

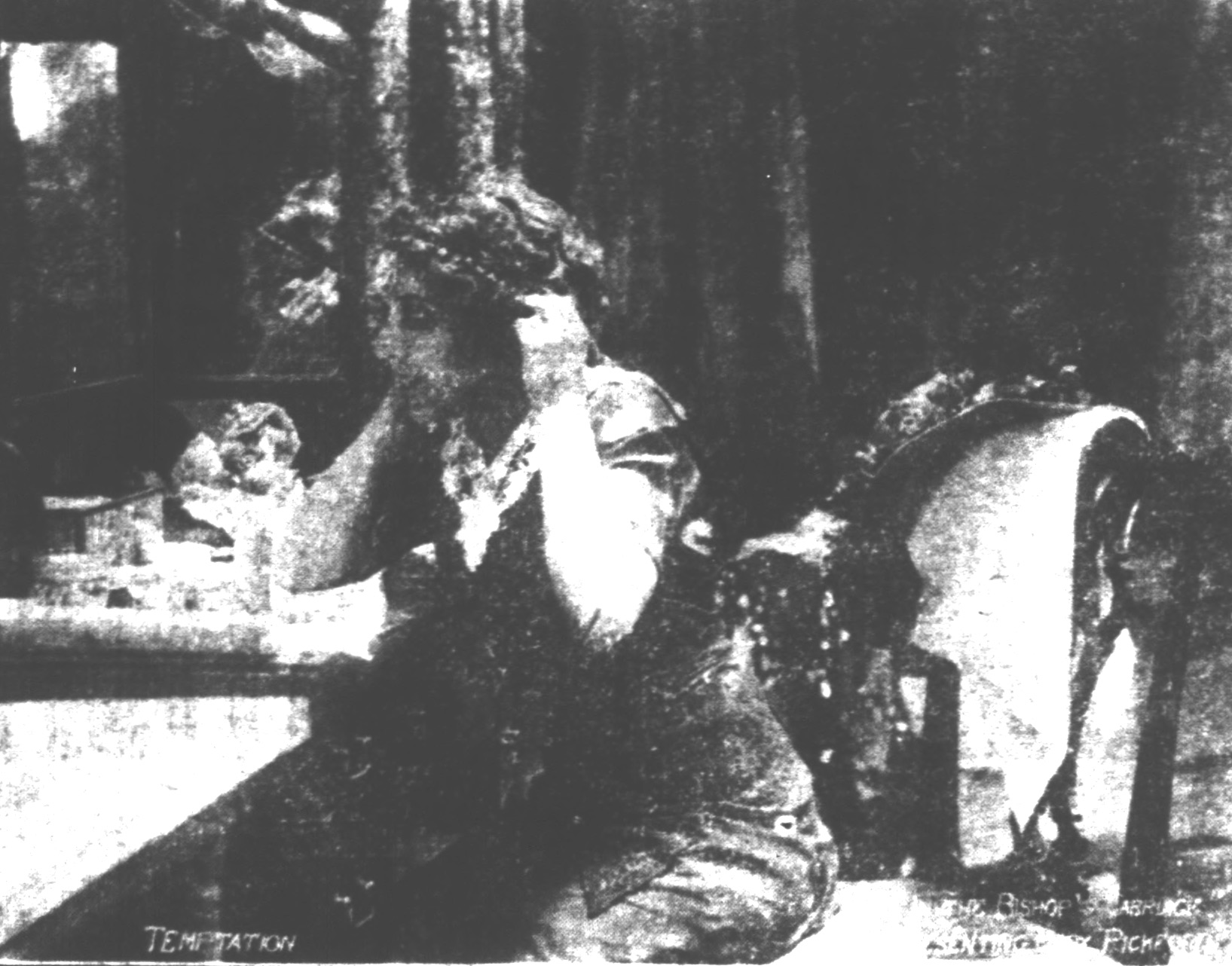
Scene from the film as published in a contemporary newspaper.

In the Bishop's Carriage is a 1913 American silent drama film produced by Famous Players Film Company and starring Mary Pickford. It is based on the novel of the same name by Miriam Michelson. This film is lost.

The story was filmed again in 1920 by Zukor as She Couldn't Help It, starring Bebe Daniels.

== Cast ==
- Mary Pickford as Nance Olden
- David Wall as Tom Dorgan
- House Peters as Obermuller
- Grace Henderson as Mrs. Ramsay
- George Moss as The Bishop
- Howard Missimer as Detective
- Camilla Dalberg as The Actress
- John Steppling as Mr. Ramsey
