= Peter David Edstrom =

American sculptor (1873–1938)

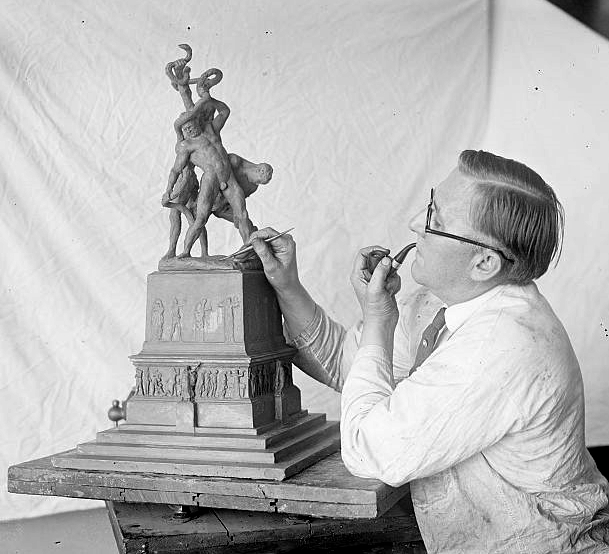
Peter David Edstrom in 1922.

Peter David Edstrom (a.k.a. Pehr David Emanuel Edström and David Edstrom; March 27, 1873 – August 12, 1938) was a Swedish-American sculptor.

== Background ==
Edstrom was an immigrant from Vetlanda, Jönköping County, Sweden. In 1880, he immigrated to the United States with his parents, Jonas (John) Peter Edström (1829–1906) and Charlotta Carolina Gustafsson Edström (1833–1903). Edstrom lived in Ottumwa, Iowa, from 1882 to 1894, which he embraced as his hometown and where he became aware of his artistic skills. He returned to Sweden after a hobo's journey started in a freight train car on July 29, 1894, and ended (after a wage earner's trip across the Atlantic) in Stockholm where he supported himself during his studies at the Stockholm's Royal Institute of Technology and Royal Swedish Academy of Arts.

== Career ==
In 1900, Edstrom moved to Florence, Italy where he attended the Accademia di Belle Arti di Firenze. In Florence, he created the sculptures Caliban (1900), Sphinx (1900), Lucifer (1902), The Cry of Poverty (1903), Despair (1904), and Pride (1904). Edstrom also spent time in Paris, and became a member of the Gertrude Stein circle, appeared in some of Stein's word portraits, and sculpted the likeness of Harriet Lane Levy (the friend who brought Alice B. Toklas to Paris in 1907).

Edstrom returned to the United States in 1915. In about 1918, he designed one of his main achievements. The Soldiers and Sailors Monument in Ottumwa, featuring four reliefs on a shaft topped with a large eagle. Around 1920, he located in Los Angeles, where he was one of the organizers of the Los Angeles County Museum of Art.

== Personal life ==
Testament of Caliban, his autobiography, was published in 1937. Rupert Hughes in his foreword to the book "aver[ed]" Edstrom's self-story to be "garrulous and preposterous in its account of a man of huge appetites and colossal conceptions." Edstrom died in Los Angeles, after two marriages: "one to the daughter of a Swedish official, who wore men's attire"; and another to Cora Downer, who Gertrude Stein described as the bride of "the fat Swedish sculptor who married the head of the Christian Science Church in Paris and destroyed her."

== Other sources ==
- Brigham, Gertrude Richardson: The Story of David Edstrom (referenced in Who Among North American Authors. Golden Syndicate Pub. Co., Los Angeles, 1921.)
- Hildebrand, Carver Edstrom: David Edstrom, Swedish American Sculptor. Swedish–American Genealogist, 10, 1: pp. 17–29. March, 1990.
- Lundén, Rolf: The Rise and Fall of a Swedish-American Sculptor: The Case of David Edström. The Swedish–American Historical Quarterly 54 (3), July 2003: pp. 145–163.
- Swanson, Mary Towley: A Tangled Web: Swedish Immigrant Artists Patronage Systems, 1880–1940. St. Thomas University, 2004.

== Related reading ==
- Kellner, Bruce, ed. (1988): A Gertrude Stein Companion: Content with the Example. New York: Greenwood Press. ISBN 0-313-25078-2
- Lundén, Rolf (2014): Man Triumphant: The Divided Life of David Edstrom. Uppsala Universitet. ISBN 978-91-554-8976-2
