= Harriet Lane Levy =

American writer and art collector (1866-1950)

Harriet Levy
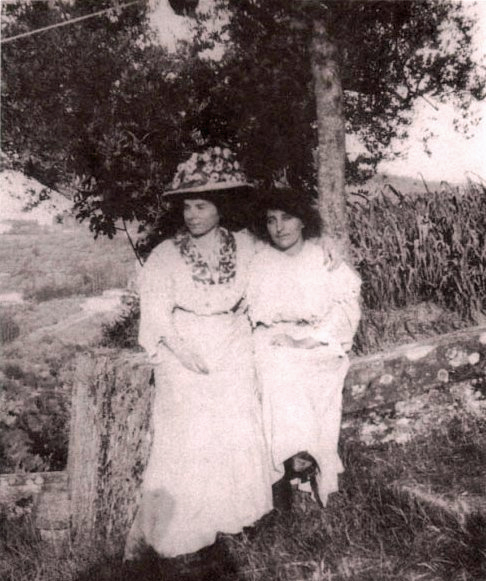
- Levy (left) and Alice B. Toklas. France, 1909.
- Born: March 29, 1866; San Francisco, California, US
- Died: September 15, 1950 (aged 84); Carmel-by-the-Sea, California
- Occupation: Writer
- Known for: 920 O’Farrell Street
- Relatives: Albert A. Michelson (cousin)

Harriet Lane Levy (March 29, 1866 – September 15, 1950) was a California writer best known for her memoir, 920 O’Farrell Street. Levy was also an avid art collector, a childhood friend of Alice B. Toklas, and an acquaintance of Gertrude Stein.

== Early life ==
Levy was born on March 29, 1866, in San Francisco, California, into an upper middle-class Polish-Jewish family. Her parents, Benjamin "Benish" and Henriette "Yetta" Levy, raised her, along with her sisters Addie and Polly, in the city at 920 O'Farrell Street which would become the topic of her memoir.

Young women such as Levy were expected to marry well-off men, which generated additional societal expectations. However, the intellectually inclined Levy was hesitant to marry early. Although her parents encouraged her to pursue an education, they also wanted her to follow 19th-century gender conventions. Levy's family was religiously observant and likely attended Sherith Israel Temple in San Francisco, but Levy later left the Jewish faith, along with her friend Sarah Stein, in favor of Christian Science.

Levy graduated from Girls' High School and then enrolled at the University of California, Berkeley at 16. For her entrance exam, she translated Heinrich Heine's poem "Die Lorelei" from German to English for Josiah Royce. She graduated from the university in 1886.

== Career ==
After graduating, Levy became a prominent writer for popular local publications, such as the San Francisco Call. She also wrote for The Wave, a San Francisco weekly, with notable writers such as Jack London and Frank Norris. In 1906, Harriet was across the San Francisco Bay when a large earthquake struck the city, and when she returned she found the house at 920 O'Farrell street completely destroyed.

When she was 40, Levy traveled to Paris in 1907 along with Sarah Stein and Alice B. Toklas, two friends who also had lived on O'Farrell Street. There they met up with more of Sarah's family, including Gertrude Stein, with whom Toklas fell in love.

In 1908, in Paris, Levy was invited to Pablo Picasso's party in the Montmartre in and Montparnasse quarters, to honor the painter Henri Rousseau. Levy wrote a description of the famed Rousseau Banquet, which was published in a limited edition of 30 copies in 1985 as part of a UC Berkeley seminar.

One of Gertrude Stein's early word portraits was dedicated to Levy. Levy became the center of considerable effort on the part of Toklas and Stein to ensure her return to San Francisco, this time without Toklas, her original traveling companion.

Levy moved to Carmel-by-the-Sea, California, in 1943 during World War II and resided at the La Playa Hotel with her companion Mary Godde.

At the age of 80, Levy's autobiography, 920 O’Farrell Street, was published. The book chronicles her childhood in an upper-middle-class San Francisco neighborhood, offering a glimpse into her early life experiences. A volume of the verse, I Love to Talk About Myself, was published the same year.

== Death ==
Harriet Levy died on September 15, 1950. A number of her unpublished manuscripts are housed at Berkeley's Bancroft Library, and some recollections from her travels in Paris were published posthumously as Paris Portraits: Stories of Picasso, Matisse, Gertrude Stein, and Their Circle.

== See also ==
- History of the Jews in San Francisco
