= La Playa Hotel =

Historic building in California, U.S.

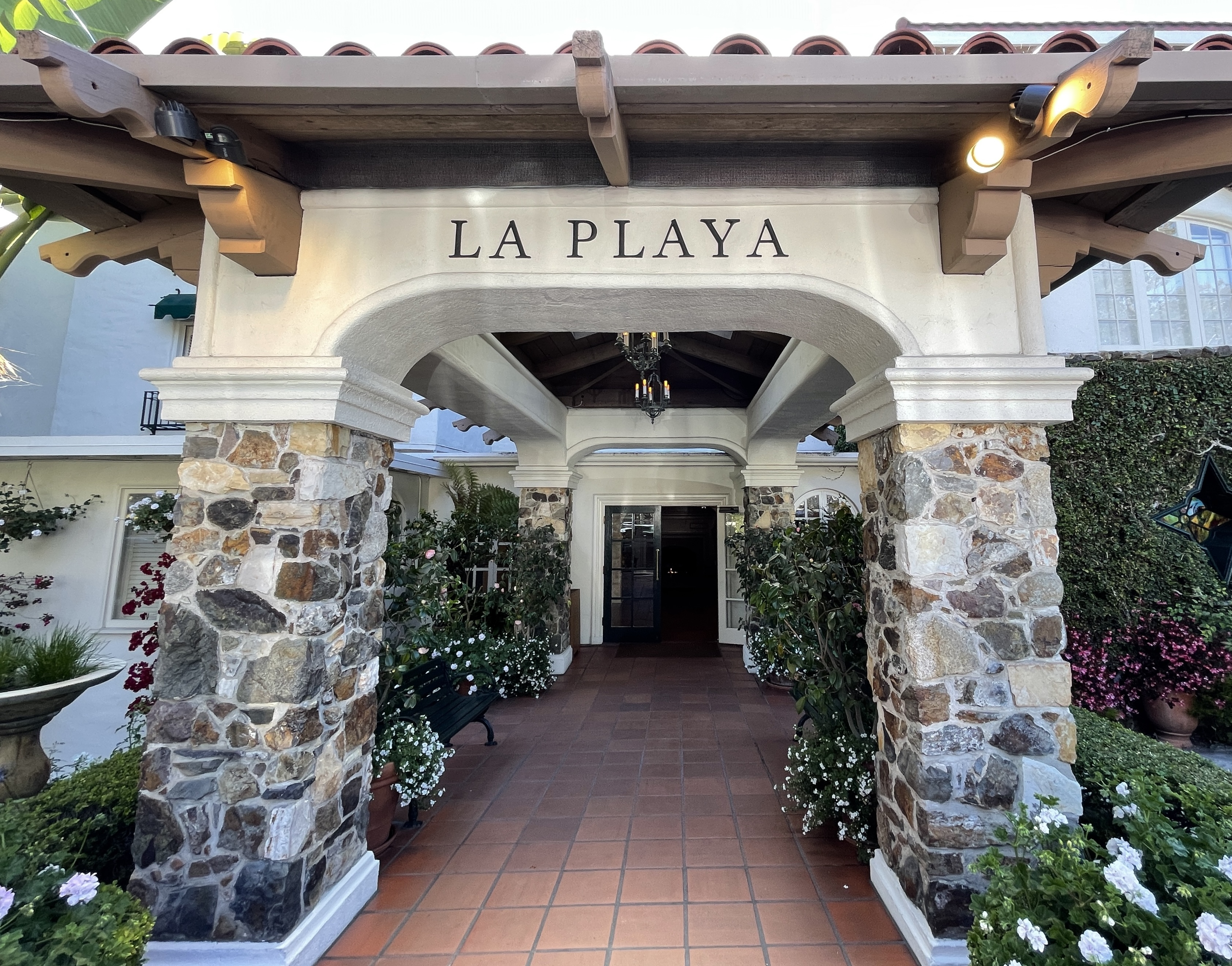

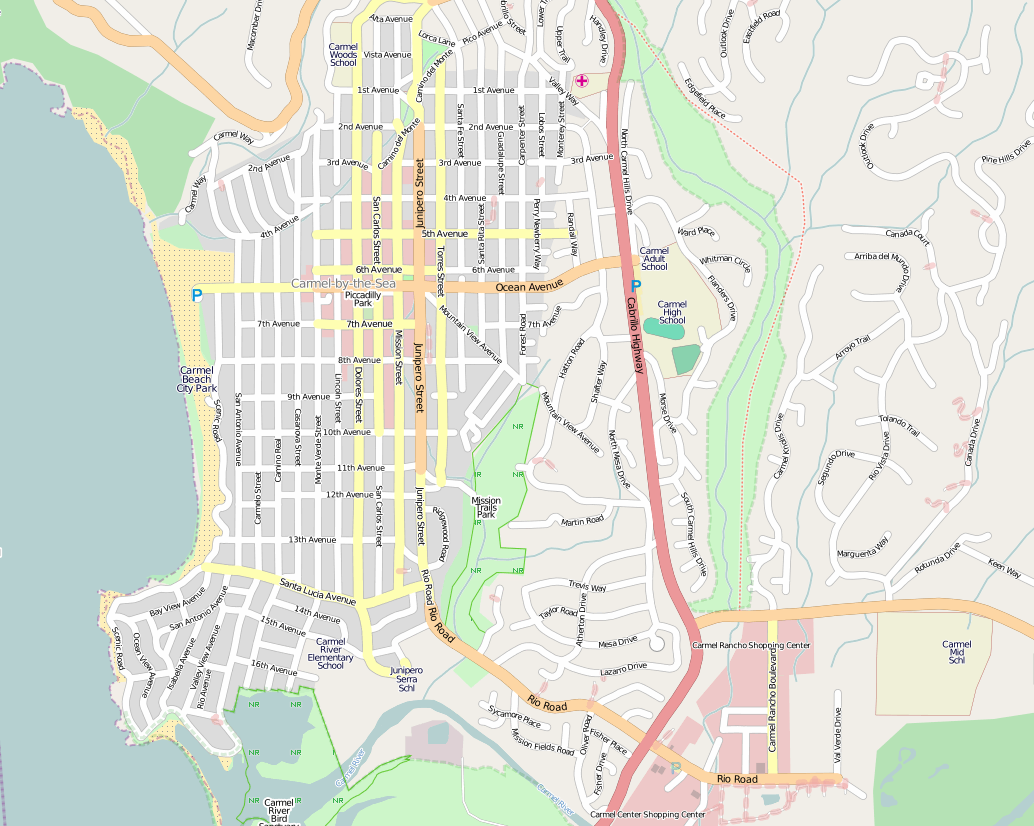
- Location in Carmel-by-the-Sea
- 36°33′9″N 121°55′32″W
- Location: Camino Real &, 8th Ave, Carmel-by-the-Sea, California

History
- Built: 1905
- Built by: Michael J. Murphy
- Built for: Chris Jorgensen
- Original use: Residence

Site notes
- Architect: Chris Jorgensen
- Architectural styles: Mediterranean Revival; Spanish Revival
- Current use: Hotel

The La Playa Hotel is a historic two-story hotel in Carmel-by-the-Sea, California, once owned by artist Chris Jorgensen. The building is an example of Mediterranean Revival architecture. The building qualified as an important commercial building and was registered with the California Register of Historical Resources on September 21, 2002.

== History ==
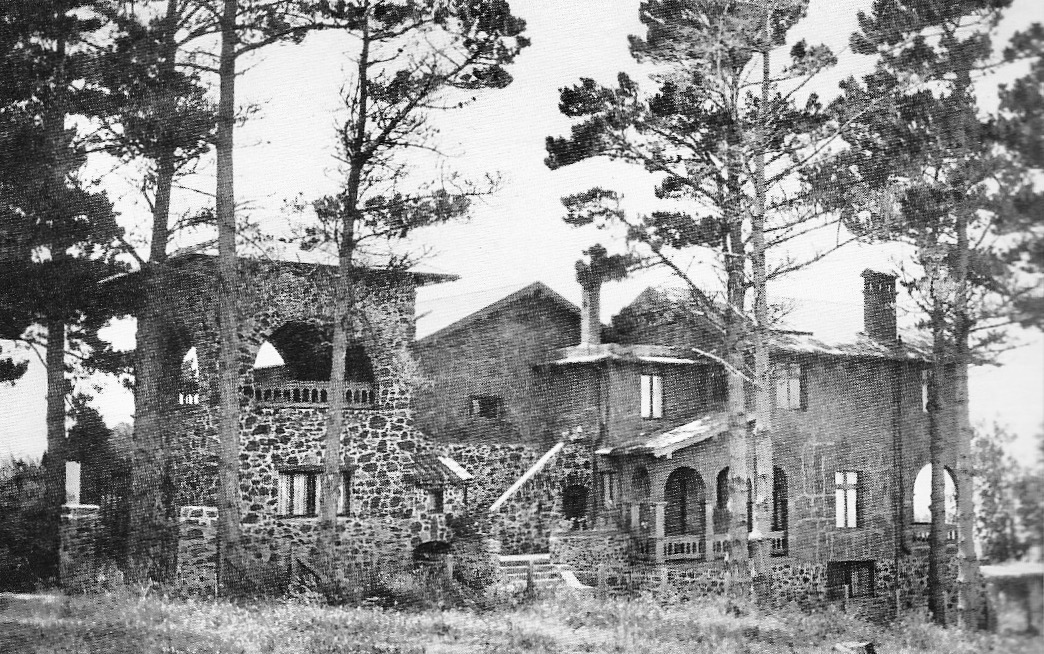
Jorgensen's two-story mansion, built in 1905, later became La Playa Hotel.

The La Playa Hotel, dates to 1905 when artist Chris Jorgensen (1860–1935) built a two-story wood-framed, ell shaped stone mansion on the southwest corner of El Camino Real and 8th Avenue, in Carmel-by-the-Sea, California. The home was a gift to his wife, Angela Ghirardelli (1859–1936), heiress to the Ghirardelli Chocolate fortune. The original part of the building was a stone tower with a quatrefoil window, on the north-east side, designed by Jorgensen and built by master stonemason Ben Turner. The upper floor had a wood railing between the stone columns that supported a low-pitched hipped roof. The property had the first swimming pool in Carmel.

=== Mansion to Hotel ===
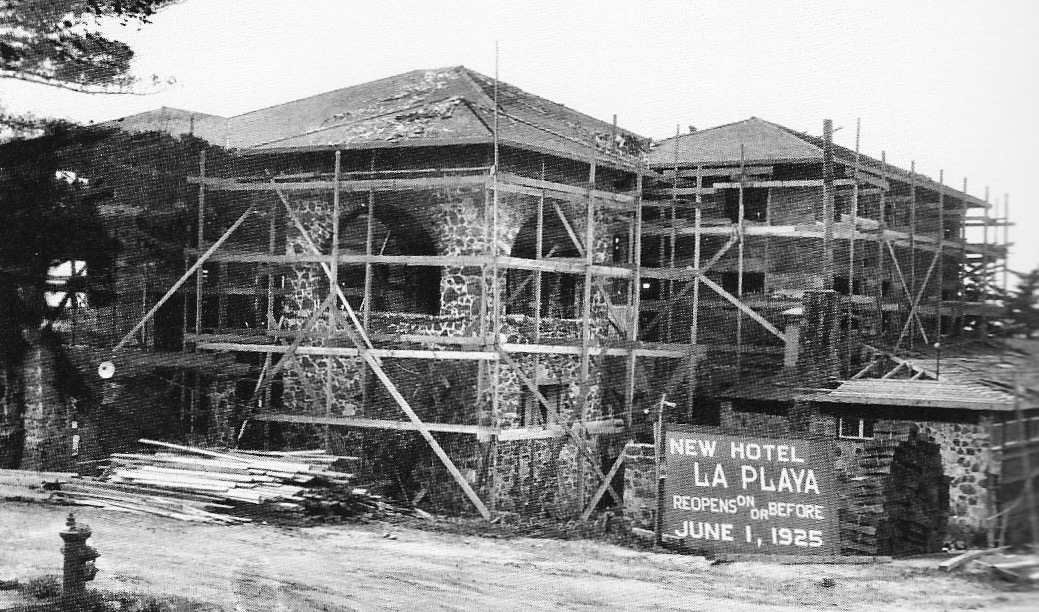
La Playa Hotel, during construction in 1925.

The Godwin's rebuilt the hotel with Michael J. Murphy as the contractor in 1925. They added an additional 30-rooms to the south wing, steam heat and private baths. The original entrance and lobby were reconstructed. Fred Godwin went on to mayor of Carmel from 1946 to 1950.

=== Hotel expansion ===
The hotel was purchased by Howard E. Allen in 1968 and underwent changes that included a full-time bar and sprinkler system. A full renovation of the hotel occurred in 1983–84, when the Cope family, owners of San Francisco's Huntington Hotel, purchased the hotel and completed a $5 million renovation, which included an upgrade and expansion to the surrounding gardens and landscaping. In 1983, Steve Jobs had an Apple development team retreat at the La Playa hotel and unveiled the Macintosh computer prototype during the retreat. He christened the computer with a bottle of La Playa water.

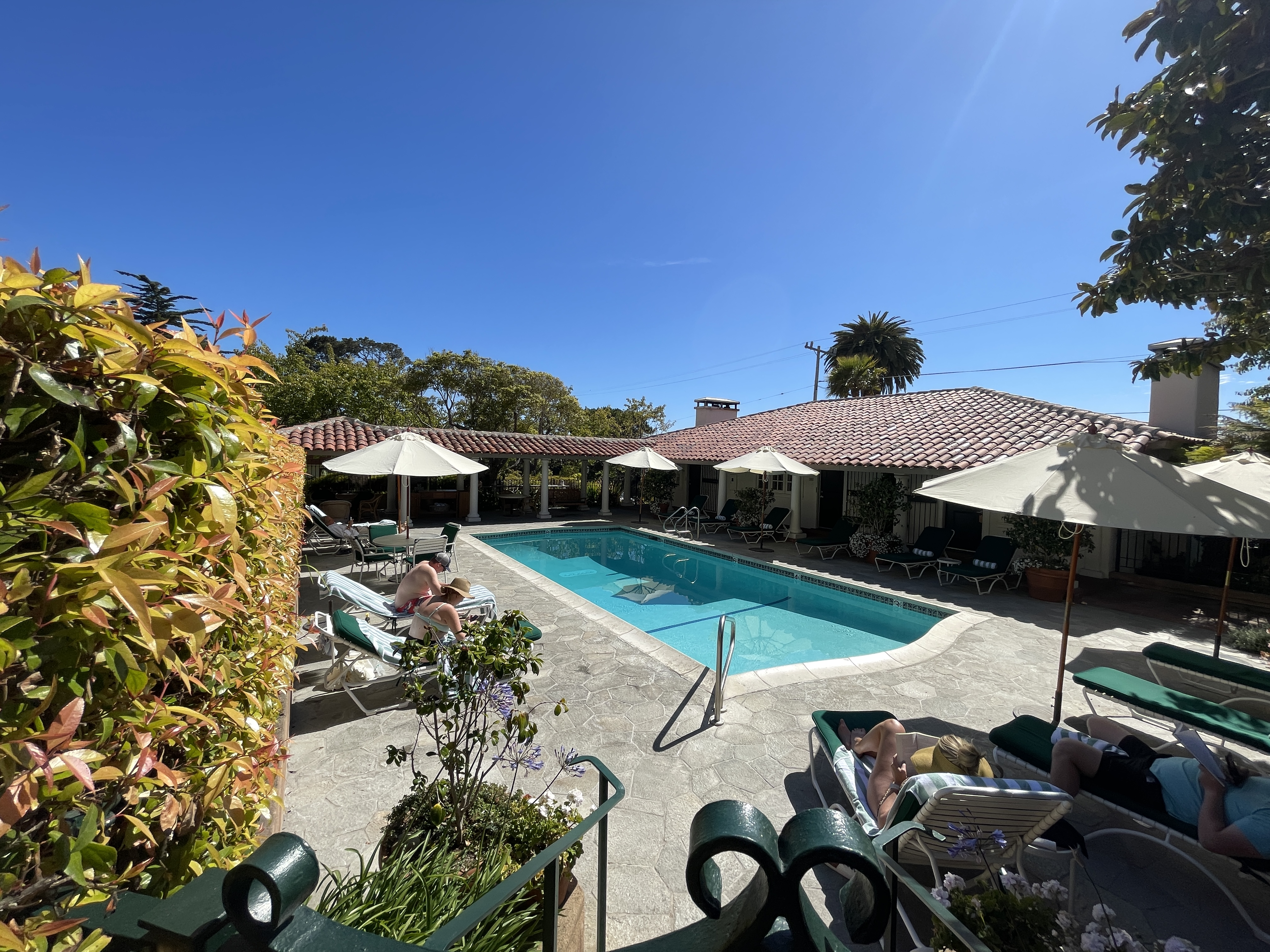
La Playa Hotel pool view

In 1992, the hotel became a member of the Historic Hotels of America and is currently one of nine hotels in California recognized by the National Trust for Historic Preservation for its architectural quality, historic character, and sensitive rehabilitation. The hotel was registered with the California Register of Historical Resources on September 21, 2002. It qualifies under the California Register criterion 1, in history as one of the earliest remaining artists’ studios in Carmel, and one of the most notable hotels in the history of Carmel. It is also significant under criterion 3, in the area of architecture as one of the few artist designed studio buildings remaining in Carmel, and an example of the early work of stonemason Ben Turner.

== See also ==
- List of hotels in the United States
