= Channing Pollock (writer) =

American dramatist

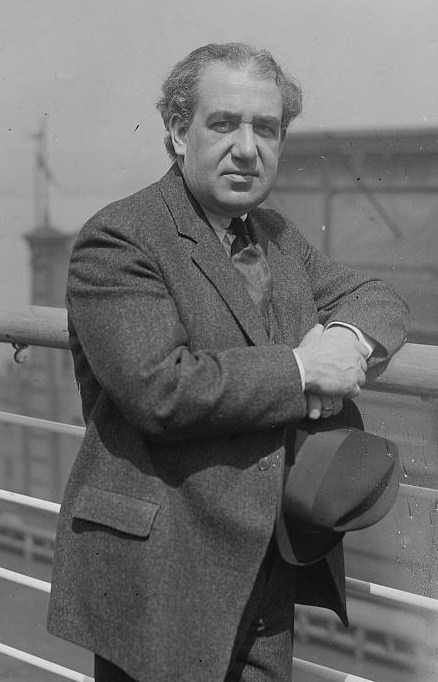
- Born: March 4, 1880; Washington, D.C.
- Died: August 17, 1946; Shoreham
- Occupations: Screenwriter, composer, critic, writer
- Relatives: John Pollock, Catherine Pollock

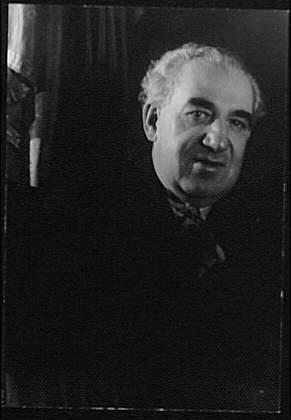
Channing Pollock, photo by Carl Van Vechten (April 27, 1934)

Channing Pollock (March 4, 1880 – August 17, 1946) was an American playwright, critic and screenwriter, whose works included The Evil Thereof (1916) and the memoir The Footlights, Fore and Aft (1911). Pollock is perhaps best remembered in connection with a review of one of his later plays, in which Dorothy Parker wrote "The House Beautiful is the play lousy."

Pollock began his career in 1896 as the dramatic critic at The Washington Post, and later worked at the Washington Times.

== Biography ==
His father, Alexander L. Pollock, was consul of the United States of America in San Salvador, El Salvador. His mother took Channing and his two siblings to join him in April 1894. They took the Pacific Mail Steamship Company liner SS San Blas from San Francisco and arrived at the port of Acajutla on April 7. The country was at peace when they arrived; however, by the end of the month, the Revolution of the 44 occurred, during which President Carlos Ezeta was overthrown.

Following this revolution, an epidemic of yellow fever broke out. Pollock, his siblings and mother were relocated to Santa Tecla, a neighboring city, to avoid contagion. Eight days after his mother left, Pollock was sent to San Salvador; at his arrival, he saw his mother "standing at the door, screaming in terror to turn back; that his father was dying of yellow fever and that he must not expose himself and the others to it." The following day, Pollock's father died. Pollock and his brother John were sent to the nearest town, where they saw it "draped in mourning for some minister," not knowing that it was their father. They were not informed of their father's death until four or five days after the funeral, where his father, a Unitarian Protestant who could not be buried in the city's Catholic cemetery, was buried outside the cemetery walls in a barely marked grave.

Pollock and his caretaker contracted a fever, and went three weeks without any medical treatment aside from "an old 'indian'" who "used to come with berries and say prayers over them for us." The other children later contracted the illness as well. Their caretaker fell unconscious and was awakened by a Mrs. Campbell, who brought them some little food and gave her the news that Mrs. Pollock was dying. Shortly after, they received a letter stating that Mrs. Pollock had gone to Santa Tecla to try and recover, and they went to join her. When they saw her, the children could not recognize her because of the state she was in.

The following morning, a physician ordered her to be moved to a steamer to leave the country. She burned many things of value and left behind many valuable goods before leaving to La Ceiba, near modern-day Colón, where they took a train to Sonsonate. Here Pollock once again contracted a fever and had to be taken to another town to find a doctor. The steamer arrived, but the doctor had advised them that moving Pollock would kill him, but at the same time remaining would kill his mother. After hesitating and discussing with the consular agent, they took the last train to Acajutla. They took a boat going south to Corinto to avoid the quarantine of Guatemala, they stayed here eight days and from there they took a boat for San Francisco. They finally arrived in San Francisco on November 15, where they were cared for by friends.

He was married to cat breeder and Manhattan Opera House press agent Anna Marble Pollock, daughter of actor and songwriter Edward Marble.

== Death ==
Pollock died at his summer home in Shoreham, Long Island in August 1946, a few months after his wife.

== Selected Broadway productions ==
- At Home With Ethel Waters (English lyrics for "My Man" by Channing Pollock) (1953)
- The House Beautiful (1931)
- Mr. Moneypenny (1928)
- The Enemy (1925–1926)
- The Fool (1922–1923)
- Ziegfeld Follies of 1921 (Dialogue by Channing Pollock and with songs with lyrics by Channing Pollock) (1921)
- The Sign on the Door (1919–1920)
- Roads of Destiny (1918–1919)
- The Crowded Hour (1918–1919)
- The Grass Widow (Book and lyrics by Channing Pollock) (1917–1918)
- Ziegfeld Follies of 1915 (Book and lyrics by Channing Pollock) (1915)
- A Perfect Lady (1914)
- The Beauty Shop (Book and lyrics by Channing Pollock) (1914)
- Her Little Highness (Book and lyrics by Channing Pollock and based on the comedy Such a Little Queen, by Channing Pollock) (1913)
- My Best Girl (Book and lyrics by Channing Pollock) (1912)
- The Red Widow (Book and lyrics by Channing Pollock) (1911–1912)
- Ziegfeld Follies of 1911 (Additional music by Channing Pollock) (1911)
- Such a Little Queen (1909)
- The Secret Orchard (1907–1908)
- In the Bishop's Carriage (1907)
- Clothes (1906–1908)
- The Little Gray Lady (1906)
- The Pit (1904)
