= I Love You, Alice B. Toklas =

1968 film by Hy Averback

- Theatrical release poster
- Directed by: Hy Averback
- Written by: Paul Mazursky; Larry Tucker
- Produced by: Charles Maguire
- Starring: Peter Sellers; Jo Van Fleet; Leigh Taylor-Young
- Cinematography: Philip Lathrop
- Edited by: Robert Jones
- Music by: Elmer Bernstein
- Distributed by: Warner Bros.-Seven Arts
- Release dates: August 29, 1968 (Los Angeles); October 18, 1968 (United States)
- Running time: 94 minutes
- Country: United States
- Language: English
- Box office: $1.1 million (rentals)

I Love You, Alice B. Toklas is a 1968 American romantic comedy film directed by Hy Averback and starring Peter Sellers. The film is set in the counterculture of the 1960s. The cast includes Joyce Van Patten, David Arkin, Jo Van Fleet, Leigh Taylor-Young (in her film debut) and a cameo by the script's co-writer Paul Mazursky. The title refers to writer Alice B. Toklas, whose 1954 autobiographical cookbook had a recipe for "Haschich Fudge". The film's eponymous theme song was performed by sunshine pop group Harpers Bizarre.

== Plot ==
Attorney Harold Fine is cornered into setting a date for marriage by his secretary/fiancée, Joyce. Because of a fender bender, he ends up driving a hippie vehicle, a psychedelically painted station wagon. When taking his hippie brother, Herbie, to the funeral of his family's butcher he encounters Nancy, Herbie's girlfriend, an attractive, free-spirited, barefoot flower power lady. She takes a liking to Harold, and after they spend a night together in his home, makes him pot brownies. However, she departs without telling him about its special ingredient, and not knowing what they are he eats them and feeds them to his father, mother, and fiancée, who dissolve in laughter and silliness. Harold considers the "trip" a revelation, and begins renouncing aspects of his "straight" life. He leaves his fiancée at the chuppah moments before they are to be married, starts living with Nancy, and tries to find himself with the aid of a guru. Ultimately he discovers the hippie lifestyle is as unfulfilling and unsatisfying as his old lifestyle—Nancy says that monogamy "isn't hip"—and once more decides to marry Joyce. At the last minute, he again leaves her at the altar and runs out of the wedding onto a city street saying he doesn't know for sure what he is looking for but, "there's got to be something beautiful out there."

== Cast ==
- Peter Sellers as Harold Fine
- Jo Van Fleet as Mrs. Fine
- Leigh Taylor-Young as Nancy
- Joyce Van Patten as Joyce
- David Arkin as Herbie Fine
- Herb Edelman as Murray
- Salem Ludwig as Mr. Fine
- Louis Gottlieb as guru
- Grady Sutton as funeral director
- Janet Clark as Mrs. Foley
- Jorge Moreno as Mr. Rodriguez
- Ed Peck as man in dress shop

== Production ==
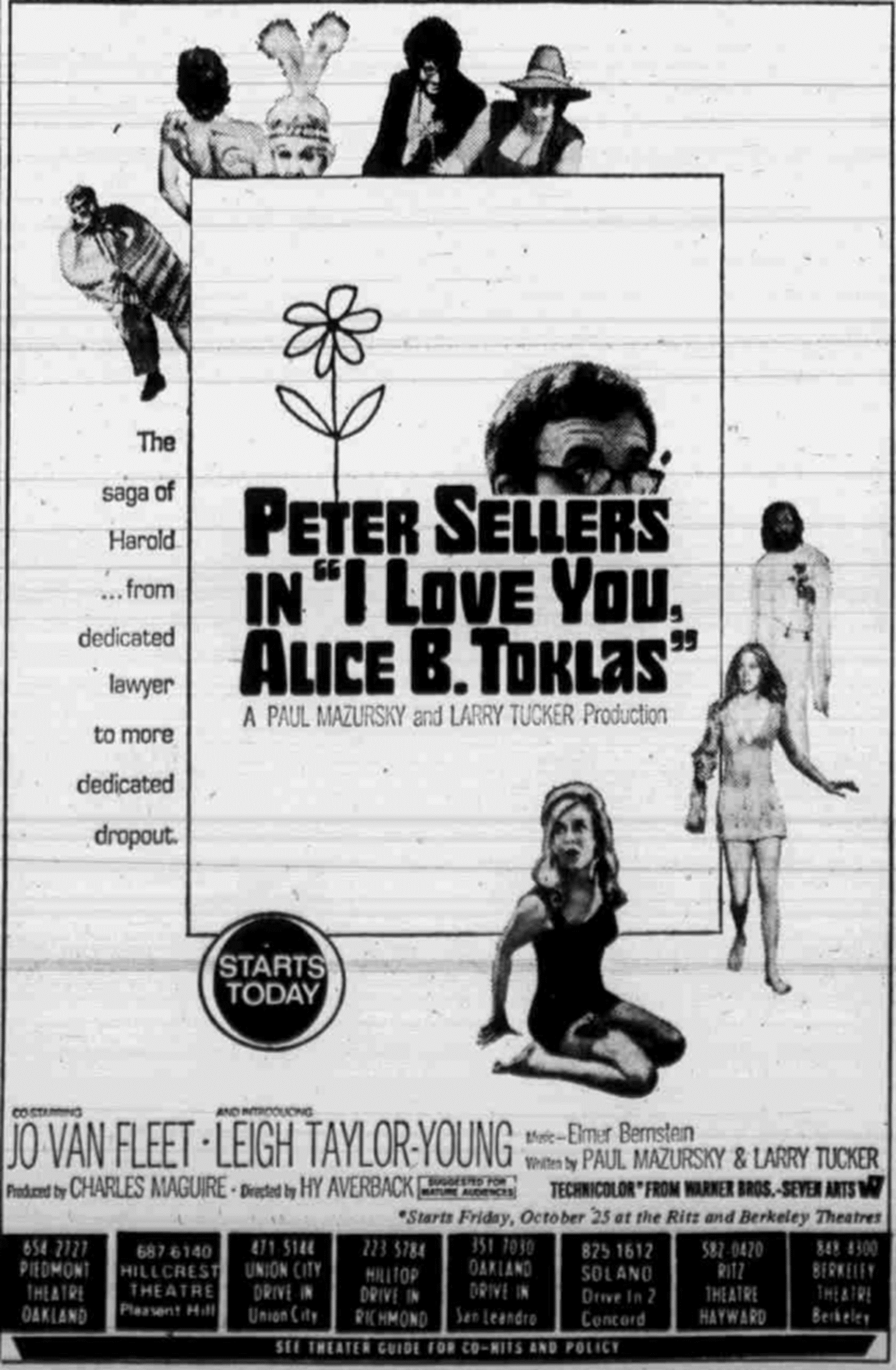
Theatrical advertisement from 1968

The film was written by Paul Mazursky and Larry Tucker, who were making their film debut as writers. Freddie Fields, then a big agent at ICM Partners, liked what he saw from the script. Mazursky was intended to direct the film while Tucker was meant to produce. However, when Fields got Peter Sellers to sign on as star, a directing search started, which went from Jonathan Miller (who Sellers rejected due to a comment about music) to Mazursky (who he accused briefly of fooling around with his wife Britt Ekland). Sellers eventually relented and asked for Mazursky's help in collaboration after one week of filming (which led to Mazursky being the "first mate" of what Sellers thought was a sinking ship), and before the film ended, there were plans to do a film adaptation of The Russian Interpreter. However, an exchange about "vibrations" when Mazursky tried to get Sellers to act tougher against Leigh Taylor-Young led Sellers to kick out Mazursky, who had to sneak out to see dailies.

== Release and promotion ==
I Love You, Alice B. Toklas opened at Pacific's Pantages Theatre in Los Angeles on August 29, 1968.

As promotion for the film, artist Andy Warhol painted a butterfly on Leigh Taylor-Young's thigh during a party at L'Etoile in New York City on September 30, 1968.

== Critical response ==
On review aggregator Rotten Tomatoes, the film holds an approval rating of 14%, based on 7 reviews, with an average rating of 4.50/10.

Vincent Canby of The New York Times called it "a very derivative comedy", with Peter Sellers "sometimes funny (as he tries to spread love among the police) but quite often grotesque (in some embarrassingly intimate bed scenes)." Variety was more positive: "Film blasts off into orbit via top-notch acting and direction. Sellers' performance – both in scenes which spotlight his character as well as ensemble sequences in which everyone is balanced nicely – is an outstanding blend of warmth, sensitivity, disillusion and optimism"; Roger Ebert found some of the movie "good and pretty close to the mark, and Sellers is very funny," he disliked the film's stereotyped view of hippiedom, concluding, "If they'd dropped Sellers into a real hippie culture, we might really have had a movie here."

== Home media ==
I Love You, Alice B. Toklas was released by Warner Home Video on June 20, 2006, as a Region 1 widescreen DVD and years later in 2014 as a DVD-on-demand title via Warner Archive.

== See also ==
- List of American films of 1968
- List of films featuring hallucinogens
