= The Alice B. Toklas Cook Book =

1954 book by Alice B. Toklas

The Alice B. Toklas Cookbook
- Author: Alice B. Toklas
- Publisher: Harper & Brothers
- Publication date: 1954
- ISBN: 978-1-897959-19-0
- OCLC: 478175

The Alice B. Toklas Cook Book, first published in 1954, is one of the bestselling cookbooks of all time. Alice B. Toklas, writer Gertrude Stein's life partner, wrote the book to make up for her unwillingness at the time to write her memoirs, in deference to Stein's 1933 book, The Autobiography of Alice B. Toklas.

"mingling of recipe and reminiscence" - Alice B. Toklas

== Liberation Fruitcake ==
When Americans liberated Culoz, their retreat from Paris after the German occupation of France, Alice made fruitcake for General Alexander Patch and the Seventh Army with hoarded citron, candied orange peel, candied lemon peel, candied pineapple, raisins, cherries, currants, almonds, marzipan and brandy.

== Hashish Fudge ==
The most famous culinary experiment is a concoction called "Hashish Fudge". Made from spices, nuts, fruit, and cannabis, Hashish Fudge quickly became a sensation in its own right. In the recipe, Toklas says it is called "the food of paradise" and goes on to suggest places where the cook might find the cannabis. She adds that the fudge can liven up any gathering and is "easy to whip up on a rainy day." She cautions two pieces are quite enough and that one should be prepared for hysterical fits of laughter and wild floods of thoughts on "many simultaneous planes." The inclusion of Hashish Fudge in the recipe book caused some media controversy when it was initially published in France, and the recipe was removed from the initial American version of the book, though appeared in later versions.

=== Legacy ===
Although Toklas later said that this recipe was given to her by her friend Brion Gysin, her name is forever linked with cannabis edibles.

A 1968 film, I Love You, Alice B. Toklas, references the popularity of Hashish Fudge in the 1960s counterculture movement.
