= Gertrude and Alice =

1981 book by Diana Souhami

- Cover of the British first edition
- Author: Diana Souhami
- Language: English
- Subject: Literary criticism
- Publisher: HarperCollins
- Publication date: 1991
- Publication place: United States
- Media type: Print
- Pages: 304
- ISBN: 978-1848851481

Gertrude and Alice is a 1991 book about Gertrude Stein and Alice B. Toklas by English biographer Diana Souhami.

== Overview ==
Gertrude & Alice opens with a brief portrait of the relationship between Gertrude Stein and Alice B. Toklas. Souhami devotes two chapters, respectively, to the early years of Gertrude Stein and the early years of Alice B. Toklas. The book then moves to a chapter on Stein's "first love", for a fellow student named May Bookstaver, a Bryn Mawr College graduate whom Stein met while studying in the medical school at Johns Hopkins University. The book covers Stein's move to Paris with her brother Leo, where they established a household on the Rue de Fleurus. A chapter is devoted to the meeting of Stein and Toklas, another to the establishment of a partnership between them, and a third to their "marriage." Other chapters cover their experience of World War I, the famous men and women they associated with, their country house in Bilignin, France, The Autobiography of Alice B. Toklas, Stein and Toklas's tour of America, their experiences of World War II, their experiences after the war ended, and Toklas's life after Stein's death.

The book contains 43 black-and-white illustrations.

== Reception ==
Souhami's book received mixed reviews in the press. Among the more laudatory reviews, Nolan Miller and Gerda Oldham wrote in The Antioch Review, "[a]lthough Souhami writes with no personal knowledge of the protagonists, she has managed to compose (from letters, memoirs, and the published works of both) an intimate portrait of two forceful and distinctive women who met in Paris in 1907 and lived together until Gertrude Stein died in 1946.... Altogether, this delightful compilation makes a coherent story."

An unsigned review in The Woman's Art Journal was similarly positive: "Diana Souhami has mined both archival and published material on the relationship between Gertrude Stein and Alice B. Toklas.... Souhami writes entertainingly about their patronage of young, avant-garde artists, the development of their art collection, and their legendary salons, which were central to Paris's cultural life for almost 40 years."

Kirkus Reviews wrote that "the odd, legendary, and passionate collaboration between Gertrude Stein and Alice B. Toklas is eyed with detailed objectivity by London critic Souhami ... Souhami's nonjudgmental (sometimes witty) reporting serves the reader well by scrutinizing this idiosyncratic pairing in all aspects, appealing and not."

Two scholarly reviewers, Linda Wagner-Martin and Anne Charles, were less impressed with the book.

Linda Wagner-Martin in American Literature complained that "[o]ne of the problems with the book is that her focus on the two makes them exactly that—college-educated, upper-class Jewish women, products of turn-of-the-century social and moral patterns. It unfortunately omits Gertrude's claim to gloire, her writing and—perhaps in some ways as interesting—her philosophy of twentieth-century art and letters. When Souhami, herself a British novelist, announces in her preface that she is not concerned with Stein's writing, the reader is forced to wonder why the book was written.

Anne Charles in the NWSA Journal lamented the way the book was documented and written: "The fact that Souhami's aim is emphatically not academic is clearly conveyed at the end of her brief preliminary remarks when she explains her often incomplete and confusing documentation system as an effort 'to avoid cluttering the text with footnotes.' In addition, Souhami's sometimes infelicitous descriptive displays are illustrated early as she encapsulates Stein and Toklas, in part, as 'two odd-looking ... women.'"

== See also ==
- The Autobiography of Alice B. Toklas

== Sources ==
- Charles, Anne (Summer 1993). "Review of Gertrude and Alice by Diana Souhami". NWSA Journal. 5 (2): 270–273. JSTOR 4316267.
- "Review of Gertrude and Alice by Diana Souhami". Kirkus Reviews. 1 December 1991.
- Miller, Nolan; Oldham, Gerda (Autumn 1992). "Review of Gertrude and Alice by Diana Souhami". The Antioch Review. 50 (4): 769–770. doi:10.2307/4612630. JSTOR 4612630.
- Souhami, Diana (1991). Gertrude & Alice. New York: HarperCollins. ISBN 978-0044408338.
- Wagner-Martin, Linda (December 1992). "Review of Gertrude and Alice by Diana Souhami". American Literature. 64 (4): 833–834. doi:10.2307/2927661. JSTOR 2927661.
- "Review of Gertrude and Alice by Diana Souhami". Woman's Art Journal. 15 (1): 55. Spring–Summer 1994. JSTOR 1358514.
