= Cannabis tourism =

Recreational drug tourism

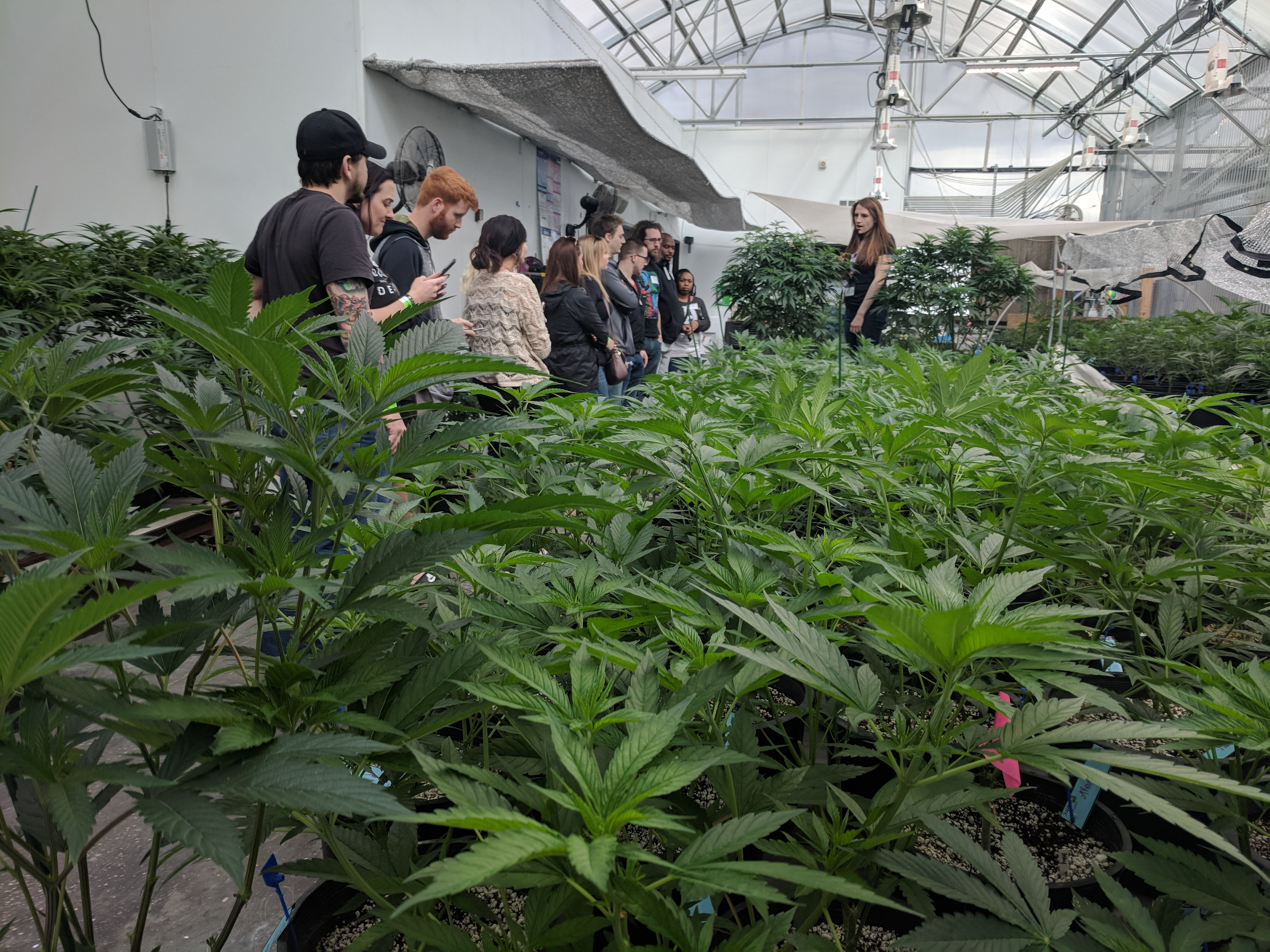
A guide leads tourists through a cannabis greenhouse in Denver, 2018

Cannabis tourism, also called marijuana tourism, is travel/tourism related to cannabis or incorporating cannabis use.

Tours, activity packages, concierge services and more are available for cannabis tourists, who may travel from jurisdictions where it is expensive, unavailable or illegal – or who may simply wish to use cannabis while on holiday. Some conventional tourist businesses (lodging, entertainment, etc.) advertise as "420-friendly", meaning they will not stop or discourage guests from possessing or consuming cannabis.

Cannabis tourism occurs in jurisdictions with modern tourism infrastructure and established tourist attractions, like resorts or nature parks. However, some isolated, impoverished agricultural communities, known for large-scale illegal marijuana production, also attract cannabis tourists, with significant economic impact.

Cannabis tourism is distinct from cannabis smuggling, the import/export of cannabis by definition in violation of the law.

== History ==
The counterculture of the 1960s renewed interest in non-Western cultures, and travel to far-flung destinations. Many, especially members of the hippie subculture, experienced destinations with centuries-old traditions of cannabis use and cultivation as they traveled across Central and South Asia. In some stops, cannabis was legal and regulated in some forms prior to modern drug prohibition, while in others production was tolerated as a cash crop.

== By destination ==
=== The Americas ===
==== Canada ====
The post-C-45 debate on regulating cannabis tourism in Canada continues, and laws vary widely from province to province. Some provinces, including Ontario and New Brunswick allow farm-to-consumer sales to encourage tourism.

==== Mexico ====
Cannabis use has often been associated with Mexico in the United States; at the time of their passage, marijuana prohibition laws in the United States were justified with explicitly racist language against Mexicans. It was a frequent destination for American hippies seeking cannabis in the 1960s; activist and professor Timothy Leary was arrested re-entering the United States from Mexico with a small amount of marijuana, leading to a court case which weakened US marijuana laws. It is speculated that US government efforts to discourage marijuana production and tourism by spraying paraquat on marijuana fields inadvertently led to an increase in the supply of American-grown cannabis beginning in the 1970s.

==== United States ====
In 2013, prior to legalization, the Washington State Liquor Control Board (now the Washington State Liquor and Cannabis Board) commissioned a study of marijuana legalization in the state, including the impact on tourism. The study, written by Carnegie Mellon University researchers, estimated over 400,000 new visits a year to the state. In 2014, the travel guide Fodors published a "how to" for marijuana tourists in Washington state. The official Washington tourism website has a FAQ section for marijuana tourism.

The Washington State legislature specifically considered tourism in its 2015 I-502 reform.

Because consumption in public is illegal, rental sites like "Bud and Breakfast", include "420 friendly" in descriptions for marijuana tourists, and marijuana tourism rental specialists have sprung up to meet demand.

The actual impact of marijuana tourism is debated. Industry groups say it is significant, but state tourism officials in Washington said there is "fairly low amounts of consumer interest through our visitor information", and in Colorado "We still don't have any numbers that support that marijuana tourism exists". An NBC News report stated that Hotels.com bookings were up slightly after legalization in both states.

Manitou Springs is a small town in El Paso County, Colorado. It is home to two recreational marijuana dispensaries, the only two in the second most populous county in the state. As a direct result of recreational marijuana sales, the city's tax base increased. Manitou sales tax collections set a record in July 2014, which included only a few hours of recreational marijuana sales for the month. One operator's Manitou Springs location is their most popular, due to its location at the foot of Pike’s Peak.

Tourism in Oregon was expected to begin in 2016 with legal retail availability for non-residents.

Expansion of marijuana tourism to Vermont, and to Mendocino and Humboldt Counties, California, has been discussed.

=== Asia ===
==== Cambodia ====
Enforcement of laws prohibiting cannabis in Cambodia is opportunistic. Food vendors in tourist centers across the country, including Sihanoukville and Siem Reap, openly sell dishes infused with cannabis, including happy pizza.

==== India ====
The cannabis plant has been used for thousands of years in India, and has become a destination for cannabis tourism. Indian law prohibits marijuana nationwide, but some states allow and regulate bhang, a preparation of cannabis leaves with religious significance in Hinduism.

The communal elder of Malana village, long world-renowned for its hashish, banned homestays in 2017 to curb cannabis tourism.

==== Laos ====
Vang Vieng was once a popular destination for cannabis tourism.

==== Nepal ====
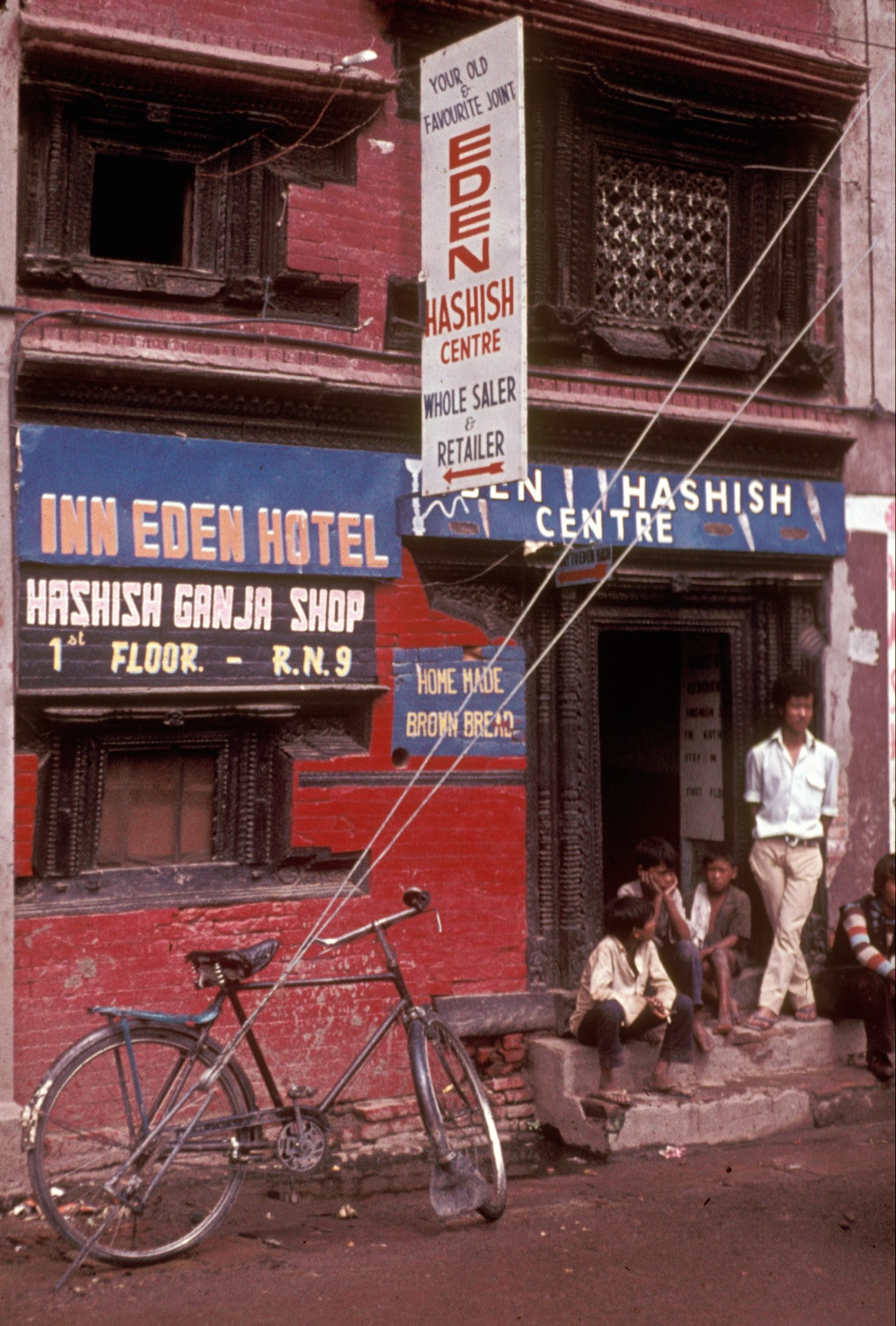
Legal cannabis shop in Kathmandu, 1973

As in India, cannabis has a long history in Nepal. Before 1973, taxed and regulated vendors of ganja, charas and bhang operated openly catering to western tourists on Old Freak Street in Kathmandu. It was only criminalized in Nepal in 1973 under pressure from the US government, and even now enforcement is opportunistic, particularly during religious festivals.

==== Thailand ====
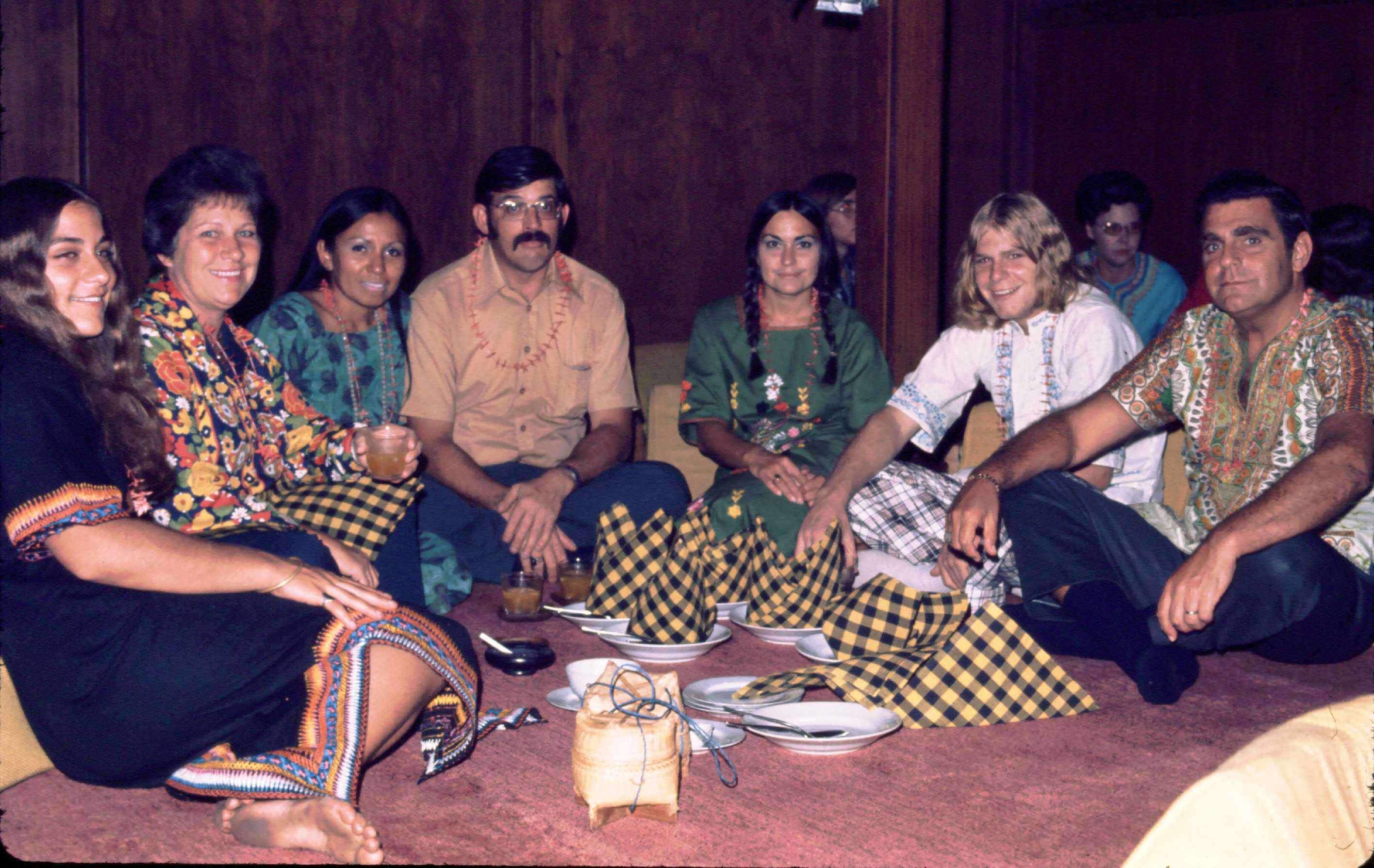
Smoking cannabis, Chiang Mai, 1973

Aggressive enforcement of cannabis prohibition in Thailand only began in the late 1970s. With new medical cannabis rules, visitors to Thailand can now obtain approval for Thai medical cannabis fairly easily, with speculation that cannabis licensing may be a source of revenue for the Thai military.

=== Africa ===
==== Malawi ====
Malawian cannabis (Chichewa: chamba) is world-renowned. Nkhotakota District, which has a productive illegal chamba industry, is particularly popular with cannabis tourists, thanks to lax enforcement and its natural beauty.

==== Morocco ====
The world-renowned kief of Ketama, Chefchaouen and the greater Rif valley attracts cannabis tourists.

==== South Africa ====
Cannabis tours are well underway in South Africa, and the continent's largest cannabis industry convention is held annually in Durban, Pretoria and Cape Town.

=== Europe ===
==== The Netherlands ====
Around the 1970s, in response to a growing counterculture, the Netherlands adopted a liberal drug policy, tolerating the use and sale of cannabis in regulated consumption lounges known as "coffeeshops". Large-scale cannabis tourism has resulted, making the policy controversial in Dutch politics and society, especially since the country entered the Schengen Area. The cannabis tourism industry in Amsterdam generates an estimated $17 billion annually. However, mayor Femke Halsema has proposed to ban foreigners from cannabis cafés.

=== Oceania ===
==== Australia ====
Nimbin, New South Wales is known as a destination for cannabis tourism around Australia and the world. The annual MardiGrass festival attracts thousands annually. Local police have installed closed-circuit television cameras and increased enforcement to curb cannabis tourism, with little success.

== Legality ==
Cannabis tourism has legal implications. Globally, cannabis is classed a Schedule I drug under the 1961 Single Convention on Narcotic Drugs, which are allowed for medical use but considered addictive and prone to abuse.

=== Efforts to discourage cannabis tourism ===
Some countries, including Russia, South Korea and Japan, prosecute their citizens for consuming cannabis in jurisdictions where it is legal.

== See also ==
- Enotourism
- Recreational drug tourism
- High Committee Cannabis Travel Guide
