= Happy pizza =

Pizza with cannabis-infused ingredients

Happy pizza is a style of pizza made in Cambodia which includes cannabis-infused ingredients and has enough THC for psychoactive effects.

Crazy happy pizza is a pizza offered by The Pizza Company in Thailand, ingredients inspired by tom yum gai soup some of which are cannabis-infused. It does not have significant amounts of THC, but may have other cannabinoids. It is served with a deep-fried cannabis leaf on top. The name is a reference to the Cambodian happy pizza.

== See also ==
- Cannabis tourism § Cambodia
