= Cannabis edible =

Food item containing cannabis extract or cannabinoids

A cannabis edible, also known as a cannabis-infused food or simply an edible, is a food item (either homemade or produced commercially) that contains decarboxylated cannabinoids (cannabinoid acids converted to their orally bioactive form) from cannabis extract as an active ingredient. Although edible may refer to either a food or a drink, a cannabis-infused drink may be referred to more specifically as a liquid edible or drinkable. Edibles are one of several methods used to consume cannabis. Unlike smoking, in which cannabinoids are inhaled into the lungs and pass rapidly into the bloodstream, peaking in about ten minutes and wearing off in a couple of hours, cannabis edibles may take hours to digest, and their effects may peak two to three hours after consumption and persist for around six hours. The food or drink used may affect both the timing and potency of the dose ingested.

Most edibles contain a significant amount of THC, which can induce a wide range of effects, including: heightened sensory perception, relaxation, sleepiness, dizziness, dry mouth, euphoria, depersonalization and/or derealization, hallucinations, paranoia, and decreased or increased anxiety. THC-dominant edibles are consumed for recreational and medical purposes. Some edibles contain a negligible amount of THC and are instead dominant in other cannabinoids, most commonly cannabidiol (CBD) or cannabinol (CBN). One of the main characteristic of cannabis edibles is that they take longer to affect users compared to smoked cannabis.

Foods and beverages made from non-psychoactive cannabis products are known as hemp foods.

== History ==
=== Eastern ===
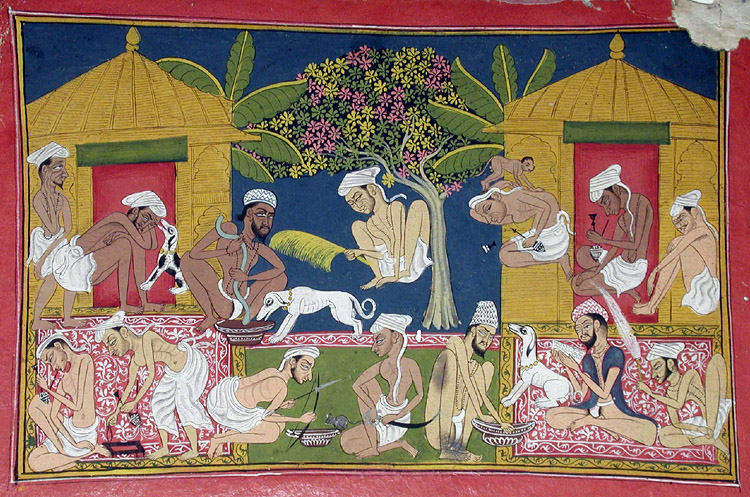
Bhang eaters from India c. 1790. Bhang is an edible preparation of cannabis native to the Indian subcontinent. It has been used in food and drink as early as 1000 BC by Hindus in ancient India.

The earliest mention of cannabis-infused food was as far back as 2000 B.C. in India. Known as one of the oldest cannabis traditions, Bhang – a cannabis infused drink made with yogurt, nuts, spices, rose water – is an official drink of Holi, highly celebrated and revered festivals celebrated by the people of Hindu community in India revering Shiva or Kali. The extraction of cannabinoids was also somewhat known to ancient Indians, with Sanskrit recipes requiring cannabis flower to be sautéed in ghee before mixing it with other ingredients.

Majoun (cannabis jam) is another early type of edible first created by the nomadic Berber tribes of North Africa sometime around the 11th century. The traditional Majoun recipe calls for cannabis extract, datura seeds, honey, nuts, kif (a mixture of kief), and sometimes dates and figs.

=== Western ===
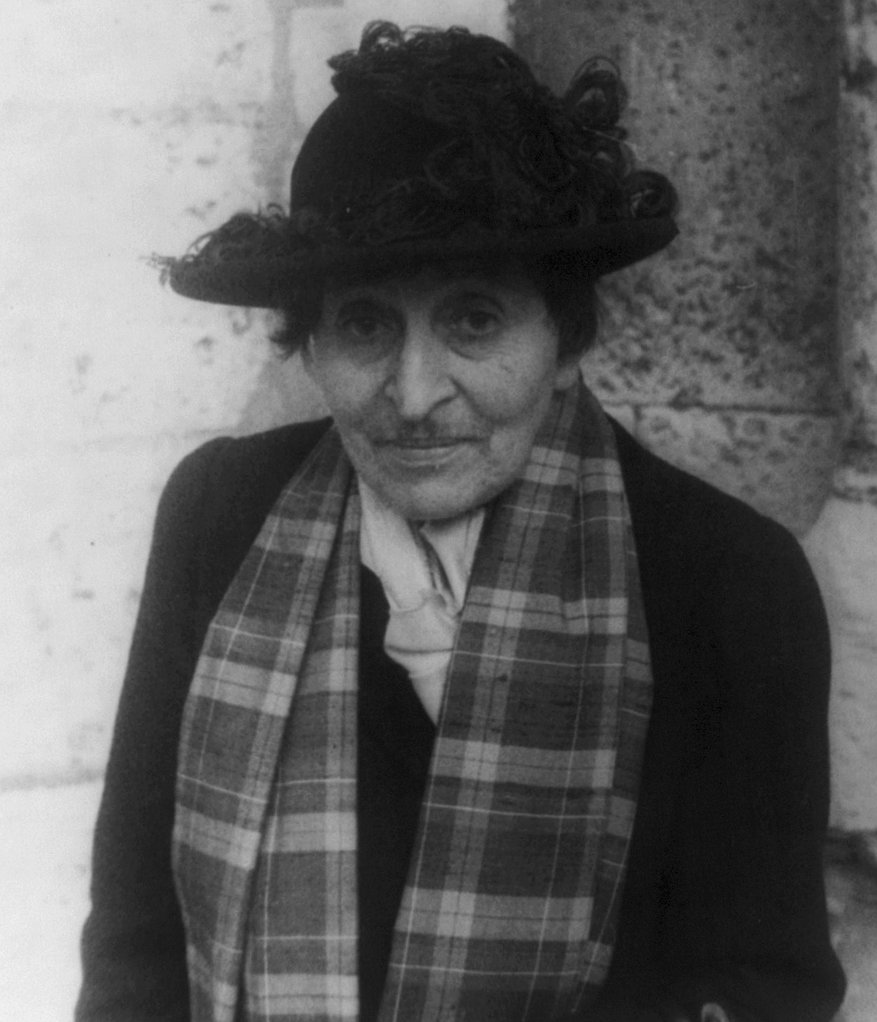
Modern interest in edibles is attributed to Alice B. Toklas and her eponymous 1954 cookbook.

The first mention of edibles in Europe appeared in a cookbook titled De honesta voluptate et valetudine, which translates to "On Honorable Pleasure and Health" written by Bartolomeo Platina in 1465.

The first cannabis edible recipe appeared in the United States in the early 1960s in a cookbook called The Alice B. Toklas Cook Book written by Alice B. Toklas. The recipe is called "Hashish Fudge" and was actually contributed by Alice's good friend, Brion Gysin. Although it was omitted from the first American editions, Toklas' name and her "brownies" became synonymous with cannabis in the growing 1960s counterculture. Since then, many more cannabis cookbooks have been published.

In some U.S. states that have legalized cannabis, edibles have experienced a dramatic rise in sales. Since edibles often look like regular candy, they can be mistakenly eaten by children. Between 2009 and 2015 after cannabis was legalised in Colorado, there was a five-fold increase in the number of children under 10 who were treated in hospital or poison center for exposure to cannabis. Edibles were implicated in over half of these. Variations in dosage and delay in onset of effects (leading to taking of additional doses) also can cause overdose especially in children and inexperienced users. Calls to poison control have dramatically increased since 2008 due to dogs ingesting edibles. In Canada, cannabis-infused food products were legalized in October 2018, but regulatory restrictions and reduced consumer interest may inhibit innovation.

== Effects ==
Ingesting cannabis may produce effects that last longer and can be more intense than inhaling cannabis. Different edible formats of cannabinoids may affect the rate of cannabinoid digestion and metabolism, which vary among people. Generally, edible cannabis products are digested more slowly than occurs for aerosol products. Oral administration generally leads to two peaks of concentration, due to enterohepatic circulation. Common side effects of ingesting edibles include increased appetite, dry mouth, and bloodshot eyes.

=== Possible health effects ===
Cannabis edibles contain both delta 9 THC, which is responsible for the psychotropic properties of feeling relaxed and euphoric, and CBD, which may have effects without the psychoactive properties. Such effects may include analgesia, decreased inflammation, decreased spasticity, and anti-seizure effects. Cannabis edibles with CBD can decrease symptoms of psychosis and anxiety. Edible oils, tinctures, pills, and gummies have been prescribed to people with cancer to potentially improve poor appetite, pain, or weight loss. Cannabis edibles may be effective for muscle spasms and pain.

=== Possible side effects ===
Some users of cannabis have reported adverse effects, such as confusion, hallucinations, panic attacks, paranoia, and intense psychotic effects. Cannabis may cause short-term impairments in cognition, memory, alertness, coordination, and balance which can increase risk of falls, especially in older people, and make driving a car dangerous.

Overdoses may occur because the dosage of THC in edibles is impossible to determine without specialized lab equipment and it varies from product to product. Some or all legalized U.S. states require packaged edibles to have dosage on the label; for instance California AB266 requires labeling to include "THC and other cannabinoid amount in milligrams per serving, servings per package, and the THC and other cannabinoid amount in milligrams for the package total", and states have required the recall of incorrectly labeled products. Overdoses can cause behavioral impairments, such as paranoia, impaired mobility, and nausea. Other risks, as a result of regular long-term cannabis use, include harmful effects to brain development, heart function, memory and cognition, and psychiatric health.

Long-term recreational marijuana use can cause cognitive impairments and also lead to cannabis use disorder (CUD). Symptoms of CUD include lack of motivation, decreased concentration, and loss of interest in other activities, tolerance, and dependence.

== Types ==
=== Edible infusions ===
==== Food ====
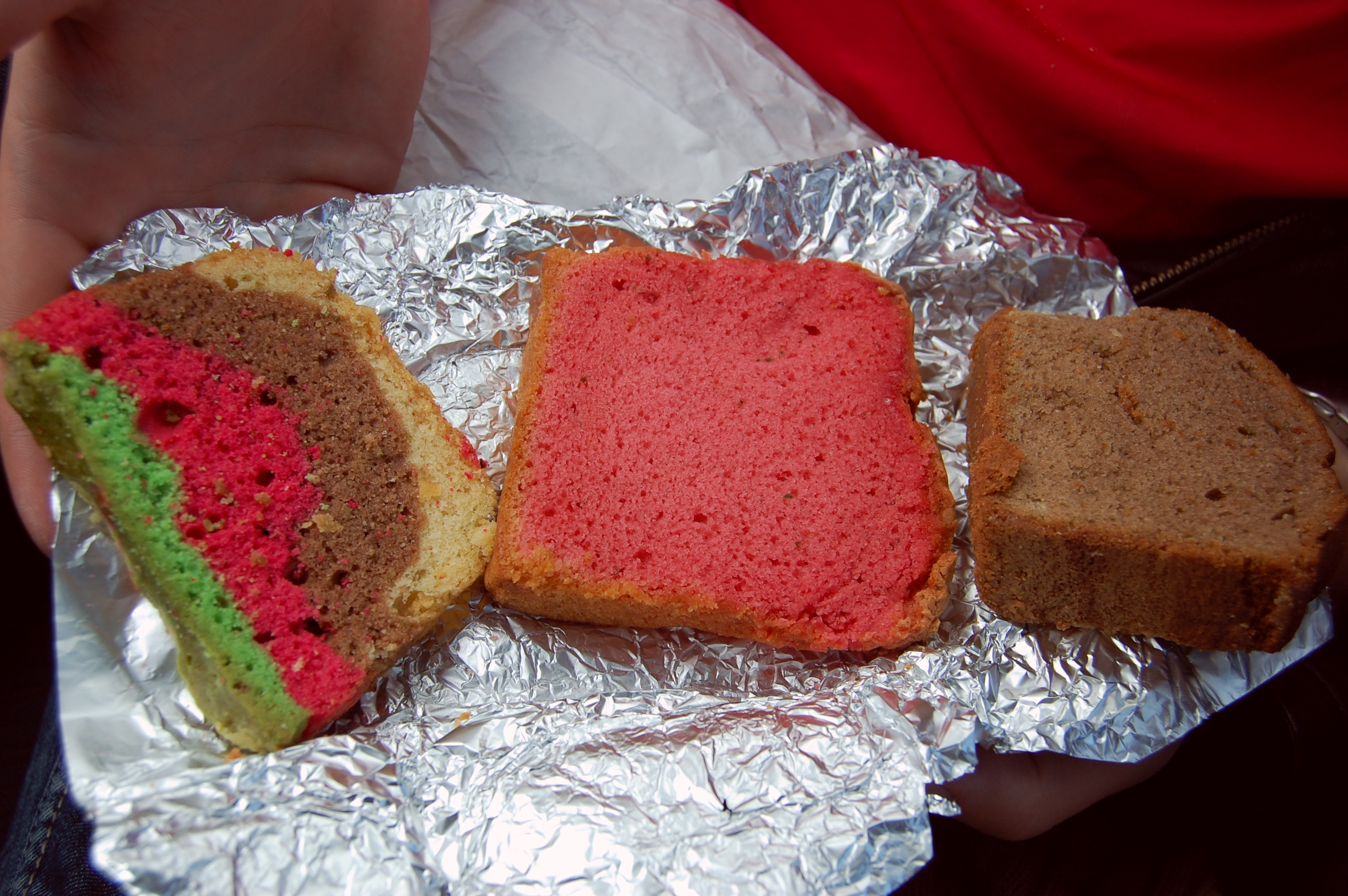
Three hash cakes made with cannabis. Such cakes are often referred to as "space cakes".

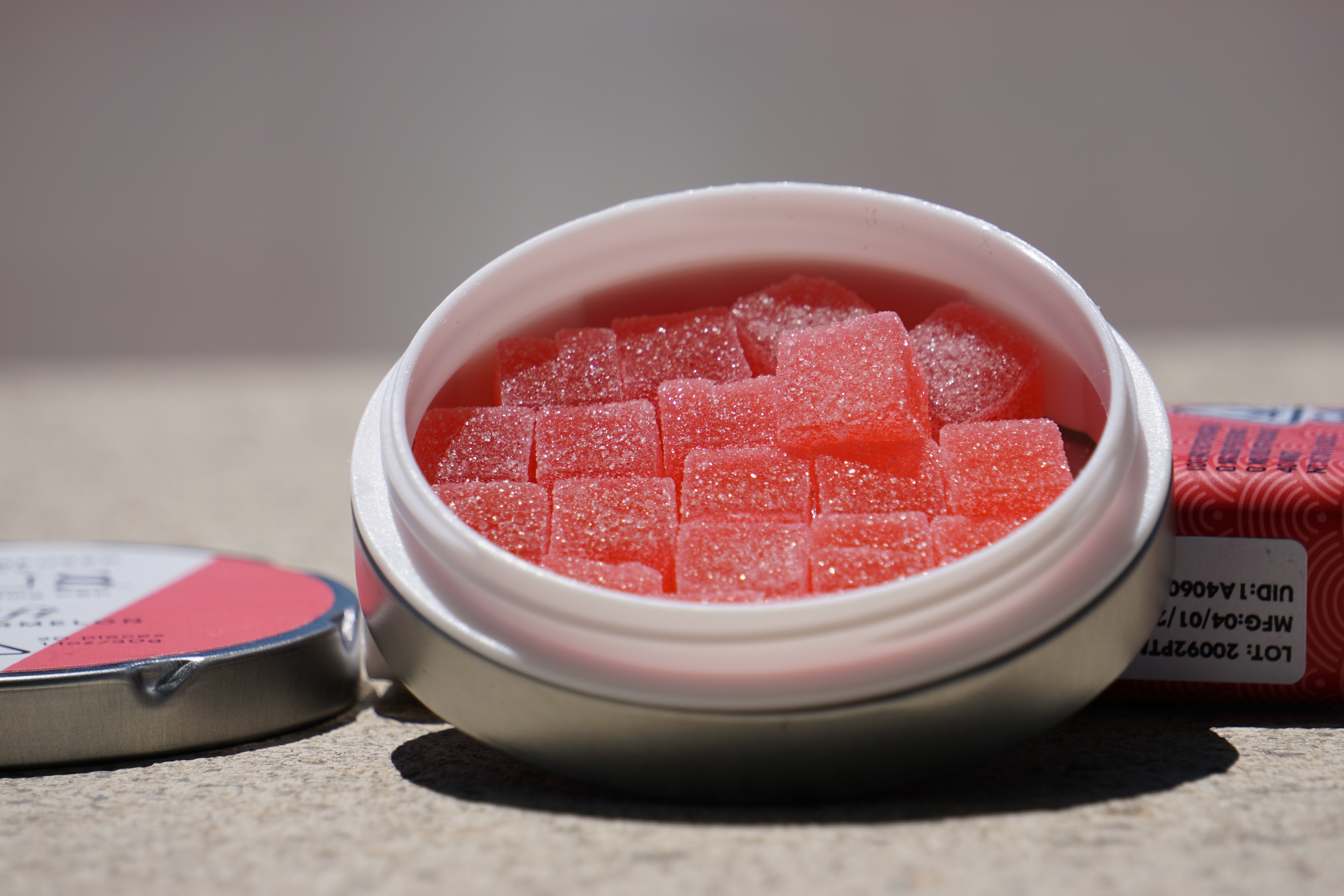
THC-infused gummies suitable for sublingual administration. These are 5 milligrams each.

The important base to all food edibles is that it has fat that has been infused with THC. In other words, any food that contains butter, oil, milk, or any fatty substance can be turned into an edible. Examples of cannabis-infused foods include baked goods, candy, potato chips, and more. One may not be able to distinguish between regular baked goods and those containing cannabinoids. A mild grassy or cannabis flavor might be detectable if sufficient cannabis quantities are used.

Dawamesc is a cannabis edible found in Algeria and some other Arab countries, made of cannabis tops combined with: "sugar, orange juice, cinnamon, cloves, cardamom, nutmeg, musk, pistachios, and pine nuts."

Happy pizza is a style of pizza in Cambodia which includes cannabis-infused ingredients and has enough THC for psychoactive effects.

Cannabis-infused brownies contain cocoa solids which forms a polysubstance combination.

==== Drink ====
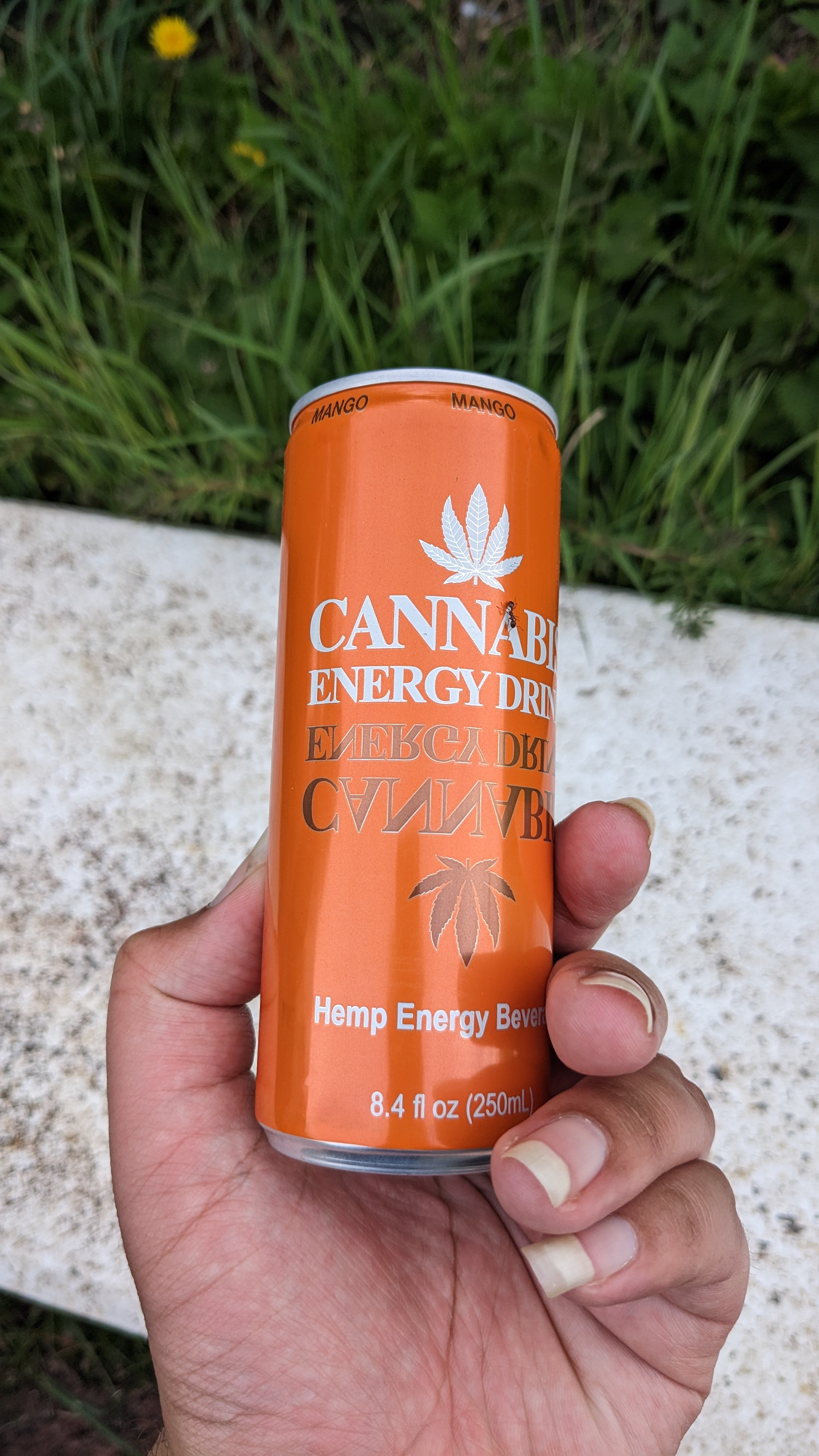
A can of hemp-based energy beverage

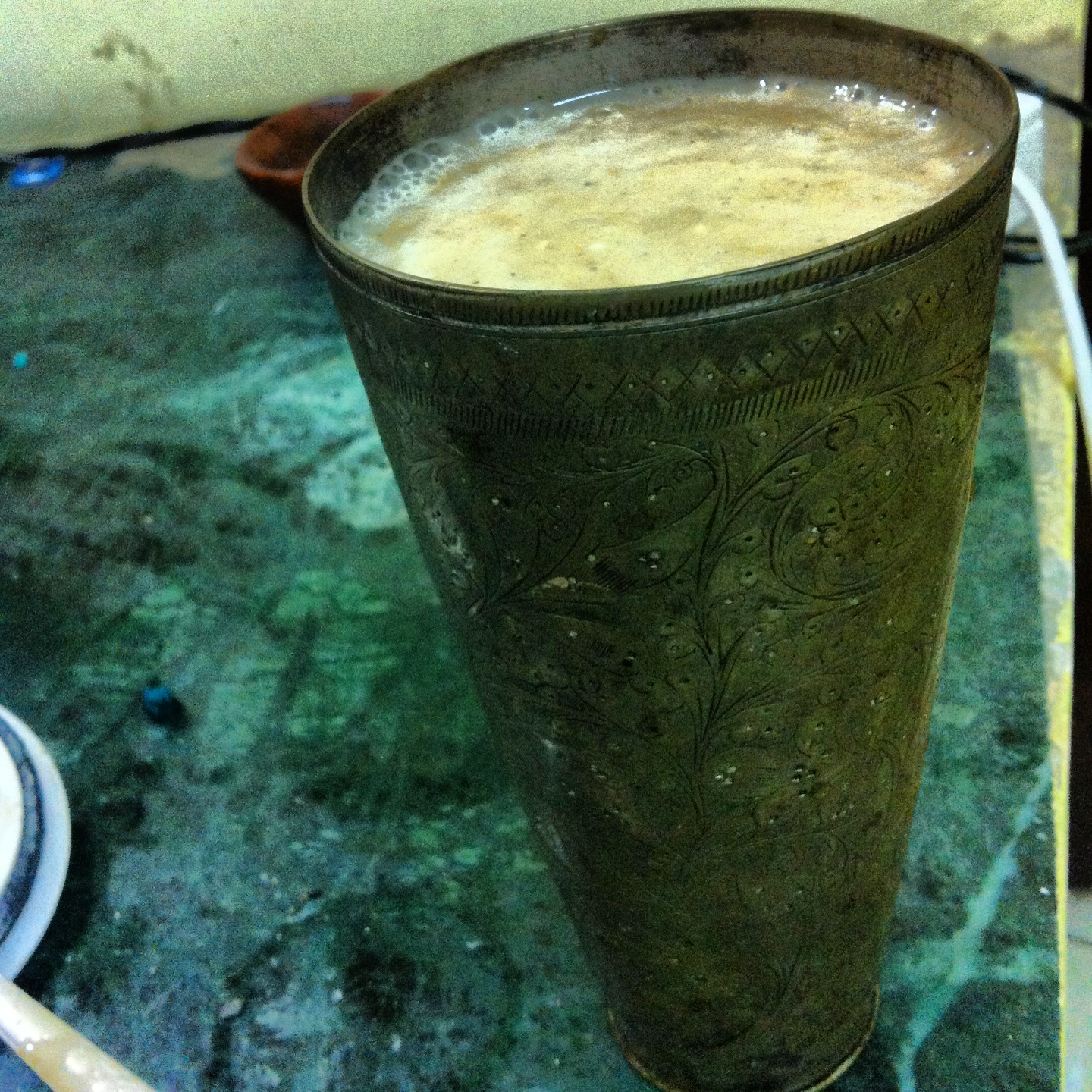
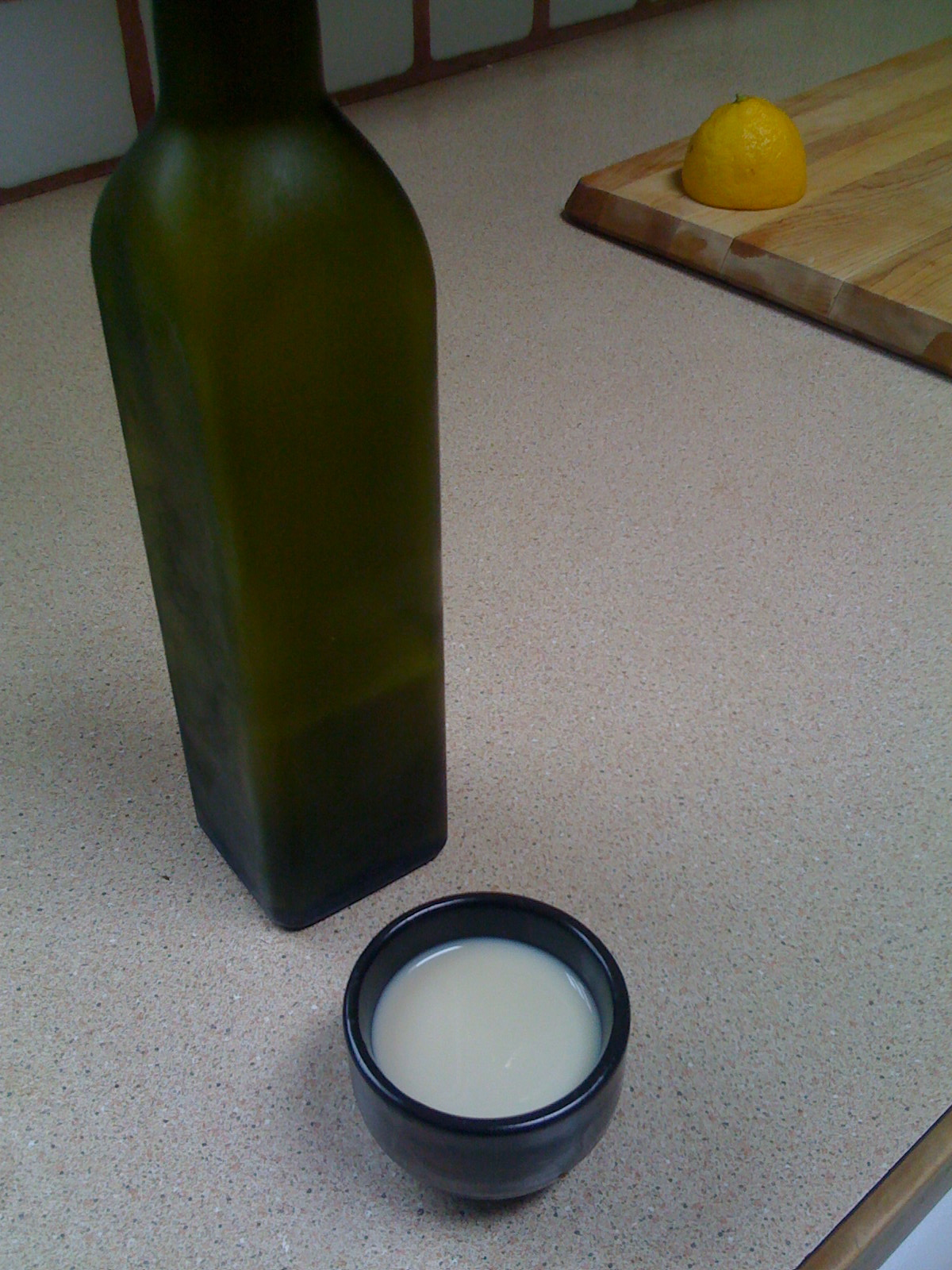
Bhang drinks

A cannabis-infused drink is a drink infused with THC and can be as potent as a cannabis-infused food.

In U.S. states that have legalized cannabis for recreational use, drinks were about 4% of the cannabis market in 2014 but had fallen to around 1.5% of the market in 2016. Cannabis infused drinks can come in the form of coffee, tea, soda, and alcohol. THC-infused seltzers, a rapidly growing category of cannabis beverages, are becoming increasingly popular as an alternative to alcohol.

List:

- Bhang
- Cannabis tea
- Maltos-Cannabis
- Pabst Blue Ribbon THC-infused seltzer

===== Tincture =====
According to the European Medicines Agency (EMA) cannabis tinctures (tincturea) are a type of liquid cannabis extract obtained using ethanol, water, glycerol, propylene glycol and fatty oils as extraction solvents, depending on the type of tincture (and also on the solvent used) it can have a specific mass/volume ratio or a specific therapeutic agents content. Tinctures are potent, alcohol-based cannabis extracts. The solubility of THC in ethanol is greater than 1 g/mL. They are considered edibles as they are meant to be absorbed through the mouth and tongue. Tinctures are generally placed under the tongue using a dropper to allow it to be absorbed into the bloodstream. Tinctures can be added to any food or drink and provides more control over the cannabis dosage compared to cannabis-infused foods or drinks.

==== Dissolvable cannabinoid powder ====
Dissolvable cannabinoid powder is tasteless and odorless, and may elicit effects typical of oral cannabis products. Powders are water-soluble and can be mixed into foods and drinks. Unlike traditional edibles which can take some 90 minutes to take effect, cannabinoid powder may produce effects within 20 minutes due to solubility and uptake of the powder constituents via the digestive tract, allowing rapid effects, especially of THC.

==== CBD edibles ====
Cannabidiol (CBD) edibles are non-psychoactive and non-intoxicating, and contain varying amounts of THC, according to the manufacturer. These edibles provide the effects of cannabis without the psychoactive response to THC.

==== Capsule ====
Cannabis capsules are considered edibles as they are also metabolized in the gut. Capsules can contain either THC or CBD and are an easier, more convenient way of administering products.

=== Ingredients ===
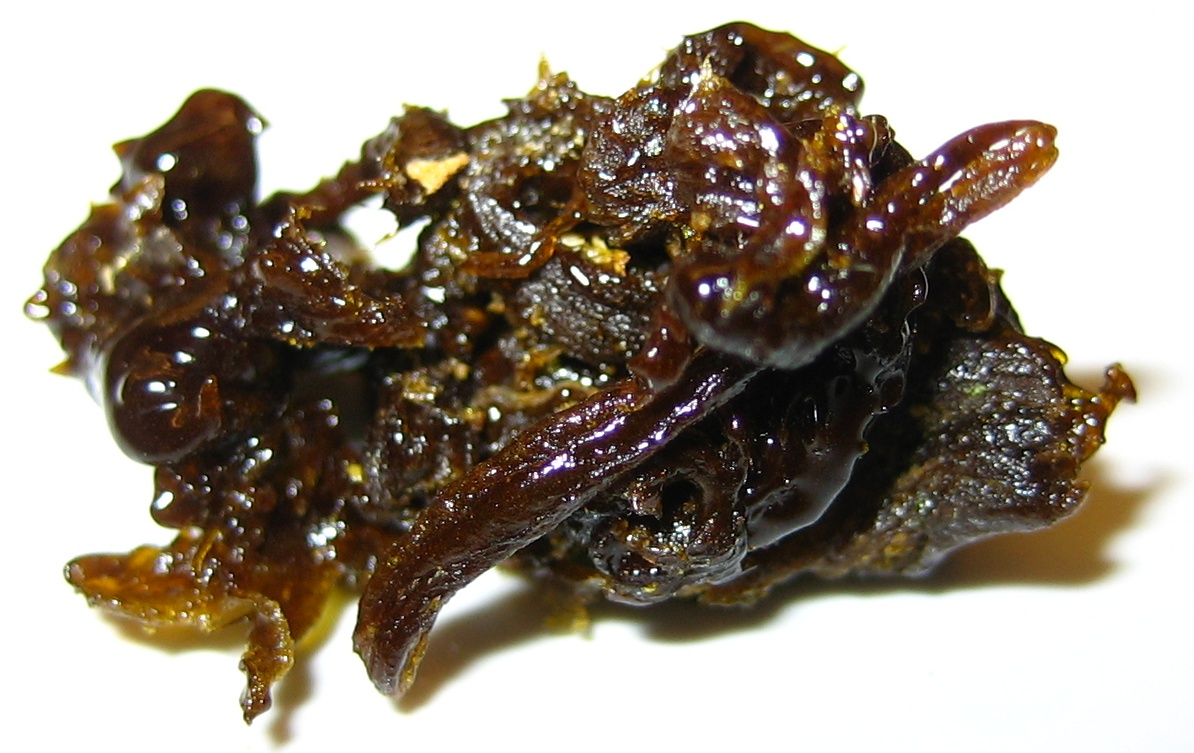
One form of hash oil

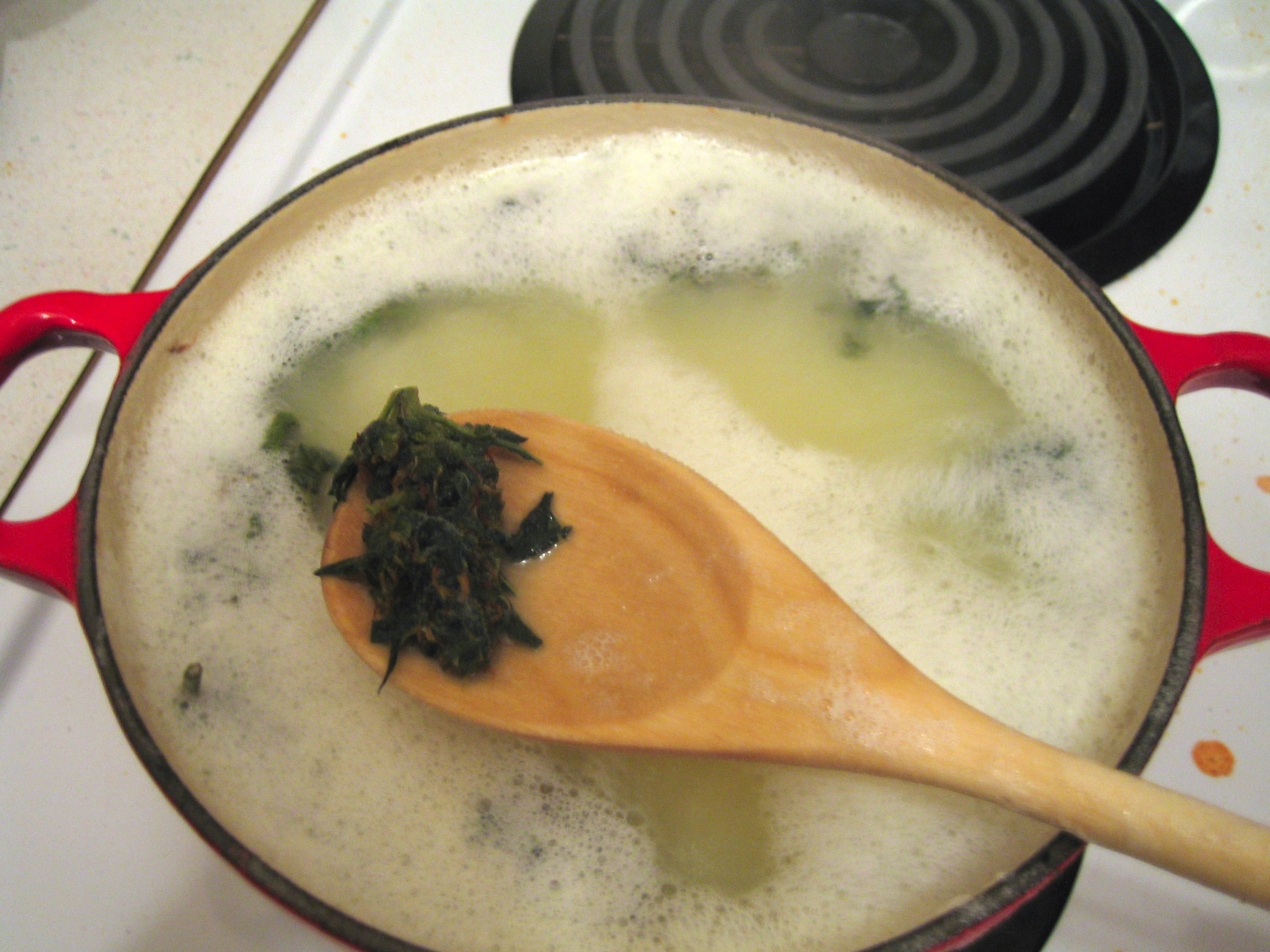
Making cannabutter

==== Oil ====
Cannabis oil, or canna-oil, is a product that combines oil with THC. This combination is achieved through a process of infusion, where the THC is extracted from the flowers or concentrates and then added to the oil. The resulting product is a liquid that can be consumed orally, used as a cooking ingredient, or applied topically. Coconut oil is a commonly used oil for infusion, but other options are olive, avocado, and walnut oil.

==== Butter ====
Cannabis butter (also called cannabutter or Marrakech butter), is unsalted butter blended with cannabis and water. Cleaned and dried buds are steeped in melted butter or oil in preparation for consumption. Cannabis butter can be added to any baking recipe.

== Safety ==
=== Physical ===
The adverse effects on health are most important when it is used in excessive quantities or with heavy frequency. A study funded by the National Institute on Drug Abuse entitled "Tasty THC: Promises and Challenges of Cannabis Edibles" found that heavy, long-term cannabis use appeared to worsen brain development, and psychiatric and heart health. On the other hand, the study also discovered that cannabis edibles did not appear to affect pulmonary function nor increase risk for cancer which is one reason people choose cannabis edibles over smoking cannabis. The study concedes that over-consuming cannabis is not lethal; to date, there has never been a death related to the actual toxicity of cannabis. However, there has been one death involving cannabis edibles.

A safety concern with regards to cannabis edibles is overconsumption which is usually caused by the delayed effects of ingested cannabis. Because users do not feel the effects of cannabis edibles immediately, users may eat more to compensate and end up consuming too much THC. As a result, cannabis edibles as such have caused the most healthcare visits as compared to other forms of cannabis consumption. (Additionally, the amount of THC in any individual product may be highly variable.) Additionally people can have very different responses to the same amount of THC with 2.5 mg being enough for some people to begin to feel effects whilst, for others, 50 mg is required. Thus typical advice for inexperienced users is to "start low and go slow" in order to gauge the over-all initial effects, with 5–10 mg being one neophyte range.

=== Psychological ===
High concentrations of THC have been shown to cause hallucinations, delusions, and anxiety in some people; for most, these symptoms only last as long as that person is intoxicated, but some people can be affected for several days. Cannabis use has been connected with increased use of other drugs, although this connection has never been shown to be causal.

=== Children ===
Many edible cannabis products are packaged in a way which could appeal to children (gummies, etc.), though laws requiring a minimum age to purchase recreational cannabis are universal in jurisdictions that have fully legalized its use, similar to age restrictions on alcohol. As with alcohol and prescription medicines, care should be taken to prevent children from having access to the product, as cannabis edibles have been the main cause of a number of health care visits relating to accidental cannabis consumption by children. In 2022, the US National Poison Data System reported about 6,000 people calling for help after children under the age of 13 ate cannabis edibles, compared to 1,800 calls for CBD and 2,000 for dried marijuana. Children under the age of 5 who ate cannabis edibles is the largest source of marijuana-related calls to poison centers (36% of calls about marijuana product exposures in 2021). Although 65% of calls about a child under 13 who had consumed edibles ultimately involved no or only minor effects, almost 3% involved a child who was experiencing life-threatening symptoms or a similar major effect from consumption of the edibles. About 60% of these calls resulted in medical evaluation, and 20% resulted in hospitalization.

Cannabis intoxication in children under 10 is primarily due to unintentional intoxication through cannabis edibles, such as a child eating what appears to be candy. In such cases, it is typically the only drug consumed by the child, and is much more likely to result in hospitalization than in teenagers. As of 2023, many children have needed care in an intensive care unit, including intubation. Although deaths and other serious outcomes are "rarely reported", at least one child has died from eating THC gummies.

== See also ==
- Brownie Mary
- Chef Ra
- Mushroom edible
