= Storefront Lawyers =

- Also known as: Men at Law
- Genre: Legal drama
- Created by: David Karp
- Directed by: Marvin J. Chomsky; Lee H. Katzin
- Starring: Robert Foxworth; Sheila Larken; David Arkin; A Martinez
- Theme music composer: Morton Stevens
- Opening theme: "Storefront Lawyers" performed by The Ventures
- Composers: Harper MacKay; George Romanis; Morton Stevens
- Country of origin: United States
- Original language: English
- No. of seasons: 1
- No. of episodes: 23

Production
- Executive producer: Leonard Freeman
- Producers: Harold Gast; Roland Kibbee
- Cinematography: Jack Courtland
- Editor: Ira Heymann
- Camera setup: Single-camera
- Running time: 48 mins.
- Production companies: Leonard Freeman Enterprises Productions; National General Corporation

Original release
- Network: CBS
- Release: September 16, 1970 – April 14, 1971

Storefront Lawyers (also known as Men at Law) is an American legal drama that ran from September 1970 to January 1971 and February 1971 to March 1971 on CBS. The series starred Robert Foxworth, Sheila Larken, David Arkin, and A Martinez.

== Plot ==
David Hansen (Foxworth) is a big-shot lawyer who grew tired of his important and expensive Los Angeles law firm Horton, Troy, McNeil, & Caroll. Hansen left his job to start a non-profit firm called Neighborhood Legal Services based in Century City, California. His associates were Deborah Sullivan (Larken) and Gabriel Kay (Arkin). Roberto (Martinez) is a law student who worked for them as a clerk.

After 13 weeks, CBS decided to take the series in a different direction so that the lawyers could take on rich clients as well. The network retitled the series as Men at Law as the three protagonists went back to work for their former law firm.

== Cast ==
=== Main ===
- Robert Foxworth as David Hansen
- Sheila Larken as Deborah Sullivan
- David Arkin as Gabriel Kaye
- A Martinez as Roberto Alvarez

=== Recurring ===
- Gerald S. O'Loughlin as Devlin McNeil

== Episodes ==
No.	Title	Directed by	Written by	Original release date	Prod. code
1	"A Man's Castle"	Lee H. Katzin	Unknown	September 16, 1970	101
A man invades an exclusive party then singles out one guest. The man shoots him dead. Guest stars: Edward Andrews, Dean Jagger, Carmen Mathews, Barry Morse, Gerald S. O'Loughlin, and Bill Zuckert.
2	"The Law Can't Touch Him"	Marvin J. Chomsky	Meyer Dolinsky	September 23, 1970	102
An abused wife asks the Lawyers' help in divorcing her violent husband. Guest stars: Melinda Dillon, Robert Dowdell, Frederic Downs, James McMullan, and Bill Quinn.
3	"Murph Collins vs. Tomorrow"	Marvin J. Chomsky	Alvin Sapinsley	September 30, 1970	103
Murph Collins loses his job to affirmative action. An explosion happens, and he is the prime suspect. Guest stars: Ramon Bieri, Lonny Chapman, Mariclare Costello, Harrison Page, Joan Shawlee, and James Stacy.
4	"The Electric Kid"	Marvin J. Chomsky	Ronald Austin & James D. Buchanan	October 7, 1970	104
A con artist pulls a big con against his landlord. The landlord's position is shaky at best. Guest stars: Leon Ames, Diana Eden, Dana Elcar, J. Pat O'Malley, William Sargent, and Joyce Van Patten.
5	"The Emancipation of Bessie Gray"	Marvin J. Chomsky	Robert Van Scoyk	October 14, 1970	105
A woman, who cannot hold a job as a nurse's aide, sues the head of the school where she got her training. Guest stars: Rupert Crosse, Claudia McNeil and Paul Stewart.
6	"Survivors Will Be Prosecuted"	Marvin J. Chomsky	Arthur Heinemann	October 21, 1970	106
Unknown Guest stars: William Conrad, Roberto Contreras, Robert Cornthwaite, Emilio Delgado, Edith Diaz, Lloyd Gough, Murray Hamilton, and Frank Ramirez.
7	"Easy to Be Hard"	Unknown	Unknown	January 10, 2000	107
A welfare case agent is accused of raping a woman. Guest stars: Lou Antonio, Isabelle Cooley, Sharon Farrell, Ned Glass, and Maidie Norman.
8	"Where Are You At?"	Unknown	George Bellak	November 4, 1970	108
Deborah, in defending a man accused of a string of arson fires, falls in love with the ADA prosecuting the case. Guest stars: Richard Anders, Robert Brubaker, Dennis King Jr, Joaquín Martínez, Bob Padilla, David Renard, Tony Roberts, Kenneth Tobey, and Bill Zuckert.
9	"Shadows of Doubt"	Unknown	Alvin Sapinsley	November 11, 1970	109
Unknown Guest stars: Anne Archer, Jonathan Lippe, Lloyd Gough, Charles H. Gray, and Bill Quinn.
10	"This Is Jerry, See Jerry Run"	Unknown	Bill Stratton	November 18, 1970	110
A young man's dyslexia lands him in financial trouble and makes him unemployable. Guest stars: Lloyd Bochner, David Doyle, John Kidd, Kurt Russell, and Patricia Smith.
11	"The Pastures of Hell"	Unknown	Harold Gast	November 25, 1970	111
The pastor of a downtown mission clashes with an activist who frequently bombs the mission. Guest stars: Beverly Atkinson, Harry Hickox, Steve Ihnat, Tony Martinez, James McEachin, and Gerald S. O'Loughlin.
12	"Where Were We, Waldo?"	Unknown	E. Arthur Keane	December 9, 1970	112
An illiterate man's arrest record makes him unemployable. Guest stars: Fran Ryan, Jacqueline Scott, Paula Victor, and Anthony Zerbe.
13	"First... We Get Rid of the Principal"	Unknown	George Kirgo	January 13, 1971	113
A student protest results in a dead administrator while a student is on trial for murder. Guest stars: Nancy Burnett, Sheldon Collins, Val de Vargas. Carmen Zapata, and Stanley Bennett Clay (Uncredited).
14	"The Climate of Doubt"	Unknown	Bill Stratton	February 3, 1971	114
A college student suspected of bludgeoning a police officer to death during a campus riot. Guest stars: David Jolliffe, Rick Kelman, John Lasell, Logan Ramsey, Dennis Redfield, and Dan Travanty.
15	"Marathon"	Unknown	Unknown	February 10, 1971	115
A student dives his car off a pier and drowns. The widow hires the lawyers to sue the psychiatrist involved. Guest stars: Jack Cassidy, Nina Foch, Sue Lyon, Greg Mullavey, and Glynn Turman.
16	"The Dark World of Harry Anders"	Unknown	Unknown	February 17, 1971	116
A heavy-handed financier takes over a movie studio and uses various means, lawful and unlawful, to compel the studio to turn a motion-picture project into a porn project. Guest stars: Lane Bradbury, Jeanne Cooper, Harry Guardino, and John McLiam.
17	"Hostage"	Unknown	Unknown	February 27, 1971	117
While a woman on trial for planting a fatal bomb, the boyfriend takes Deborah hostage in the firm's law offices. Guest stars: Meg Foster, Arthur Franz, Felice Orlandi, John S. Ragin, Ford Rainey, and John Rubinstein.
18	"The Truth, the Whole Truth - And Anything Else That Works"	Unknown	Unknown	March 3, 1971	118
A man comes home from work one day to find detectives in his house accusing him of being a serial sex murderer. Guest stars: Jean Hale, Cloris Leachman, and David Wayne.
19	"Let the Dier Beware"	Unknown	Unknown	March 17, 1971	119
When the clinic chief physician winds up dead, a woman that took her father out of a controversial clinic is the lead suspect. Guest stars: Jean Hale, Cloris Leachman, and David Wayne.
20	"The View from the Top"	Unknown	Unknown	March 24, 1971	120
A rich man hires the Lawyers after a security guard at a hotel finds him walking away from a dead woman. Guest stars: Ramon Bieri, Lane Bradford, Lew Brown, Jeane Byron, Steve Forrest, Noah Keen, Maggie Malooly, Marilyn Maxwell, Kay Medford, Gerald S. O'Loughlin, and Wayne Rogers.
21	"Yesterday Is But a Dream"	Unknown	Unknown	March 31, 1971	121
After a husband drugs his wife, the Lawyers defend the wife who shot her husband while in a drug-induced daze. Guest stars: Adele Bellroth, Melendy Britt, Ivor Francis, Lee Grant, John S. Ragin, Ford Rainey, John Vernon, and Garry Walberg.
22	"This Money Kills Dreams"	Unknown	Unknown	April 7, 1971	122
Unknown Guest stars: Martin E. Brooks, Jack De Mave, Laurence Haddon, Katherine Justice, Connie Mason, Woodrow Parfrey, Herman Poppe, Tom Skerritt, and Fritz Weaver.
23	"One American"	Unknown	Unknown	April 14, 1971	123
A small group of passionate young men protest war and find themselves behind bars. Guest stars: Brenda Dickson, Ron Hayes, William Shatner, and Jan-Michael Vincent.

== Reception ==
=== Critical response ===
In the book, The Cultural Lives of Cause Lawyers edited by Austin Sarat and Stuart Scheingold, "The Storefront Lawyers featured two men and one woman, all WASPS, but the presence of a woman was a departure at the time when women still constituted less than five percent of the profession." "The Storefront Lawyers emphasizes that passivity, suggesting lawyers do nothing unless called upon. Given anxiety over lawyers trolling for clients, this portrayal suggests there is nothing to worry about. From the viewer's perspective such things simply do not happen."

In his Time magazine interview, critic Richard Burgheim lumped the new CBS legal series together with another of the network's bids at "relevance," noting "The Storefront Lawyers (CBS) and The Interns (CBS) both exploit Mod Squad's multihero angle, but neither one is genuinely mod or engrossing."
