= David Arkin =

American actor

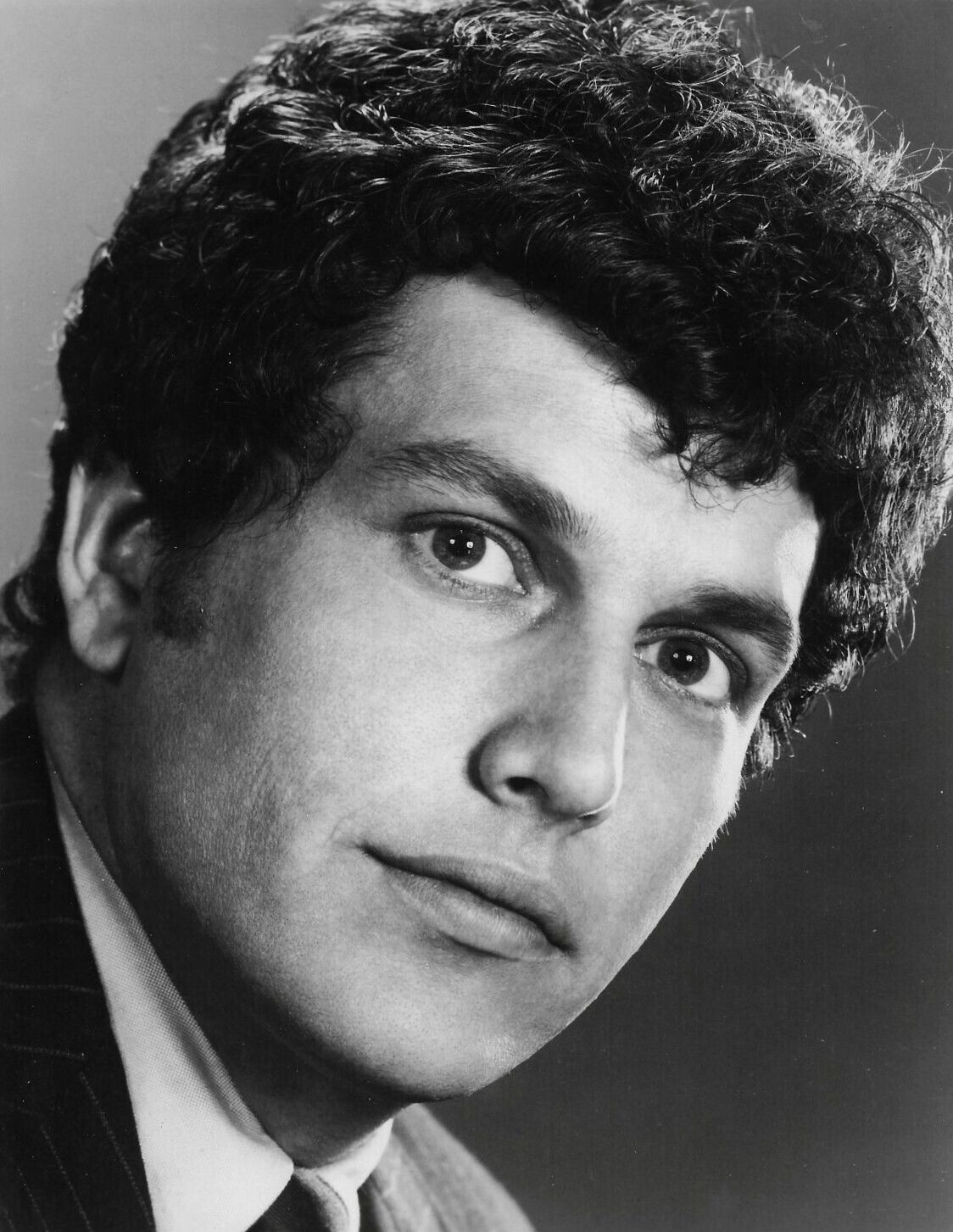
- Arkin in 1970.
- Born: David George Arkin; December 24, 1941; Los Angeles, California, United States
- Died: January 14, 1991 (aged 49); Los Angeles, California, United States
- Occupation: Actor
- Spouse: Anne E. Curry

David George Arkin (December 24, 1941 – January 14, 1991) was an American actor, known for his numerous supporting appearances in the films of Robert Altman. These roles were part of Altman's frequent ensemble and included Staff Sergeant Vollmer in M*A*S*H (where he also wrote and voiced the PA announcements), Harry in The Long Goodbye (1973), Norman in Nashville (1975), and The Mailman / Policeman in Popeye (1980).

== Early life and education ==
Arkin was born in Los Angeles, California to George Morris Arkin & Mary Eileen Collins. He graduated from University High School and later UCLA with a major in Theater Arts.

== Career ==
Arkin had an "introducing" credit in I Love You, Alice B. Toklas (1968) and brief appearances in Valley of the Dolls (1967), All the President's Men (1976), and Cannonball (1976).

His television credits include Hawaii Five-O, Whitney and the Robot, and a season-long appearance as the character Gabriel Kaye in the CBS television series Storefront Lawyers, co-starring Robert Foxworth and Sheila Larken. He also appeared on The Tonight Show Starring Johnny Carson and on the Joey Bishop and the Steve Allen late night shows with the Hollywood Sunset Strip improvisational comedy troupe The Session (which included Richard Dreyfuss, Rob Reiner, Larry Bishop, Bobbie Shaw-Chance, Marj Dusay, and Phil Mishkin); he later performed with The Second City touring troupe.

Arkin wrote Human Cargo: Great Escapes, which his wife Anne E. Curry later produced with their company Old Dime Box Productions for the Showtime television network as Escape: Human Cargo; it starred Treat Williams and was filmed in Israel. She also produced and directed One Man's Opinion, a politically incorrect take on newly released films; it starred Arkin and Professor Tyrone Shaw, now on the faculty of journalism at Johnson State College in Vermont.

== Personal life and death ==
Arkin was married three times, the last time to actress Anne E. Curry at the time of his death in 1991.

David Arkin was not related either to the actor Alan Arkin or Alan's son Adam Arkin (also an actor). Alan's father was David I. Arkin.

Arkin was known among his friends and colleagues for having introduced his friend Arnold Schwarzenegger (then Arnold Strong) to Altman, at the time The Long Goodbye was being cast. This began Schwarzenegger's career in film.

On January 14, 1991, he died by suicide in Los Angeles, California at the age of 49.

== Filmography ==
Film
Year	Title	Role	Notes
1965	Summer Children	Cord	
1967	Valley of the Dolls	Western Union Boy	Uncredited
1968	I Love You, Alice B. Toklas	Herbie Fine	
1970	M*A*S*H	Staff Sergeant Vollmer / PA Announcer	
1970	Up in the Cellar	Hugo Caine	
1973	The Long Goodbye	Harry	
1975	Nashville	Norman	
1976	All the President's Men	Eugene Bachinski	
1976	Cannonball!	TV Producer / Anchorman	
1980	Popeye	The Mailman / Police Officer	(final film role)
Television
Year	Title	Role	Notes
1970	Hawaii Five-O	George Loomis	1 episode
1970	Storefront Lawyers	Gabriel Kaye	3 episodes
1975	Medical Story		1 episode
1979	Whitney and the Robot	David	
