= The Autobiography of Alice B. Toklas =

1933 memoir by Gertrude Stein

- Author: Gertrude Stein
- Language: English
- Genre: autobiography
- Publisher: Harcourt, Brace and Company
- Publication date: 1933
- Publication place: United States
- Pages: 310 pp

The Autobiography of Alice B. Toklas is a book by Gertrude Stein, written in October and November 1932 and published in 1933. It employs the form of an autobiography authored by Alice B. Toklas, Stein's life partner. In 1998, Modern Library ranked it as one of the 20 greatest English-language nonfiction books of the 20th century.

== Summary of chapters ==
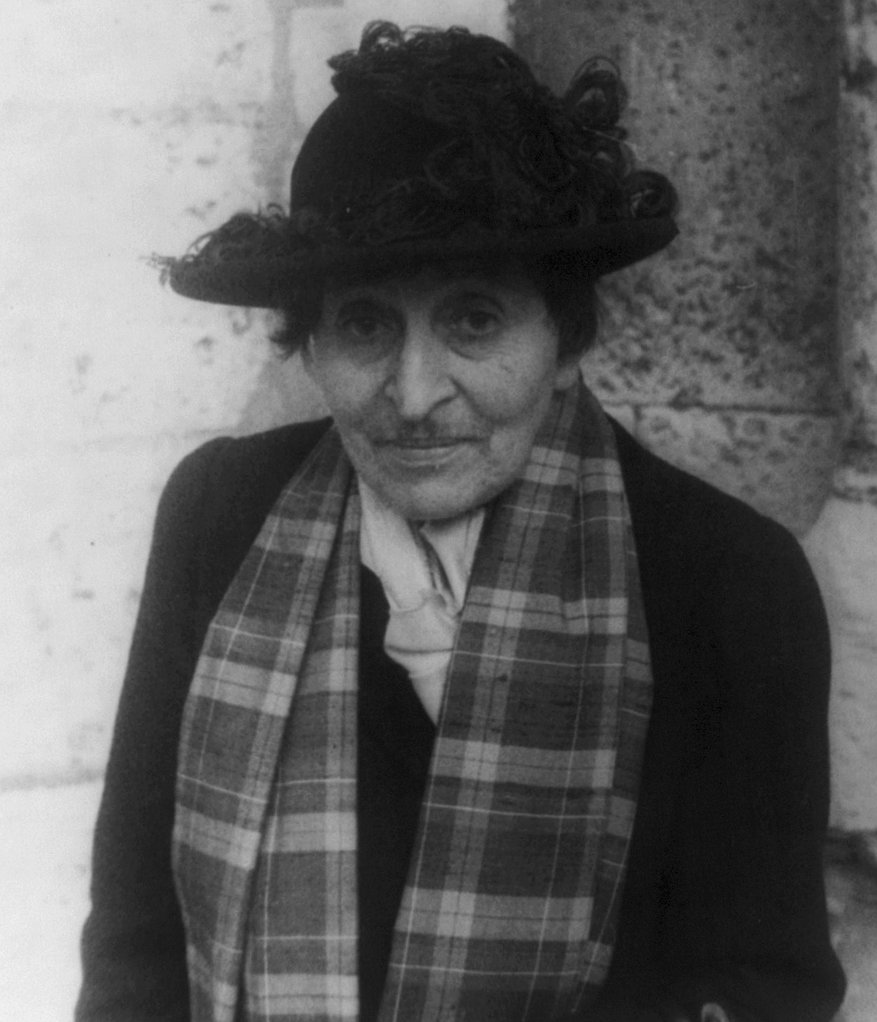
Alice B. Toklas, photographed by Carl Van Vechten, 1949

=== Before I Came to Paris ===
Alice B. Toklas, as narrator of the work, tells how she was born into an affluent family in San Francisco, describing her parents' backgrounds and family history. Later she describes meeting Gertrude Stein's sister-in-law during the fires in the aftermath of the 1906 San Francisco earthquake, and decided to move to Paris in 1907.

=== My Arrival in Paris ===
Alice writes about the important role of Hélène, Gertrude's housemaid, in their household in Paris. She mentions preparations for an art exhibition. She discusses Pablo Picasso and his mistress Fernande Olivier. Picasso and Fernande end their relationship, and Fernande moves to Montparnasse to teach French. Alice and Gertrude visit her there.

=== Gertrude Stein in Paris, 1903–1907 ===
Alice tells of Gertrude and her brother Leo Stein buying paintings by Paul Cézanne and Henri Matisse from Ambroise Vollard. They subsequently all become friends. She next discusses spending the summer with Gertrude in Fiesole, Italy, while Picasso goes to Spain. Back in France, Gertrude falls out with Guillaume Apollinaire. Later, Picasso has an argument with Matisse.

=== Gertrude Stein Before She Came to Paris ===
Alice tells how Gertrude Stein was born in Allegheny, Pennsylvania, then moved to Vienna, to Passy, and finally to New York City and California. She attended Radcliffe College, where she was taught by William James. She decided to study for a master's degree at Johns Hopkins University but dropped out because she was bored, then moved to London and was bored there too, returned to America, and eventually settled in Paris.

=== 1907–1914 ===
The episode describes the home at 27 rue de Fleurus, noting the layout of the rooms and studio (atelier). Alice tells stories about Matisse, other artists, and the writer Apollinaire. She recounts holidays in Italy and Spain with Gertrude. Finally, they move to England on the eve of World War I to meet with Gertrude's editor, leaving Mildred Aldrich alone in Paris.

=== The War ===
Gertrude and Alice begin the war years in England, and then go briefly to France to rescue Gertrude's writings. They then live in Spain for a while, and eventually move back to France. There, they volunteer for the American Fund for the French Wounded, driving through France to help the wounded and homeless. By the end of the war, Paris seems changed.

=== After the War, 1919–1932 ===
Alice tells of Gertrude's argument with T. S. Eliot after he finds one of her writings inappropriate. She talks about her friendship with Sherwood Anderson and Ernest Hemingway, who helped with the publication of The Making of Americans. There the couple makes friends with a coterie of Russian artists, but they constitute no artistic movement. Later, Gertrude gives a lecture at Oxford University. Alice then mentions more parties with artists. Later, they abridge The Making of Americans to four hundred pages for commercial reasons and devise the idea of writing an autobiography.

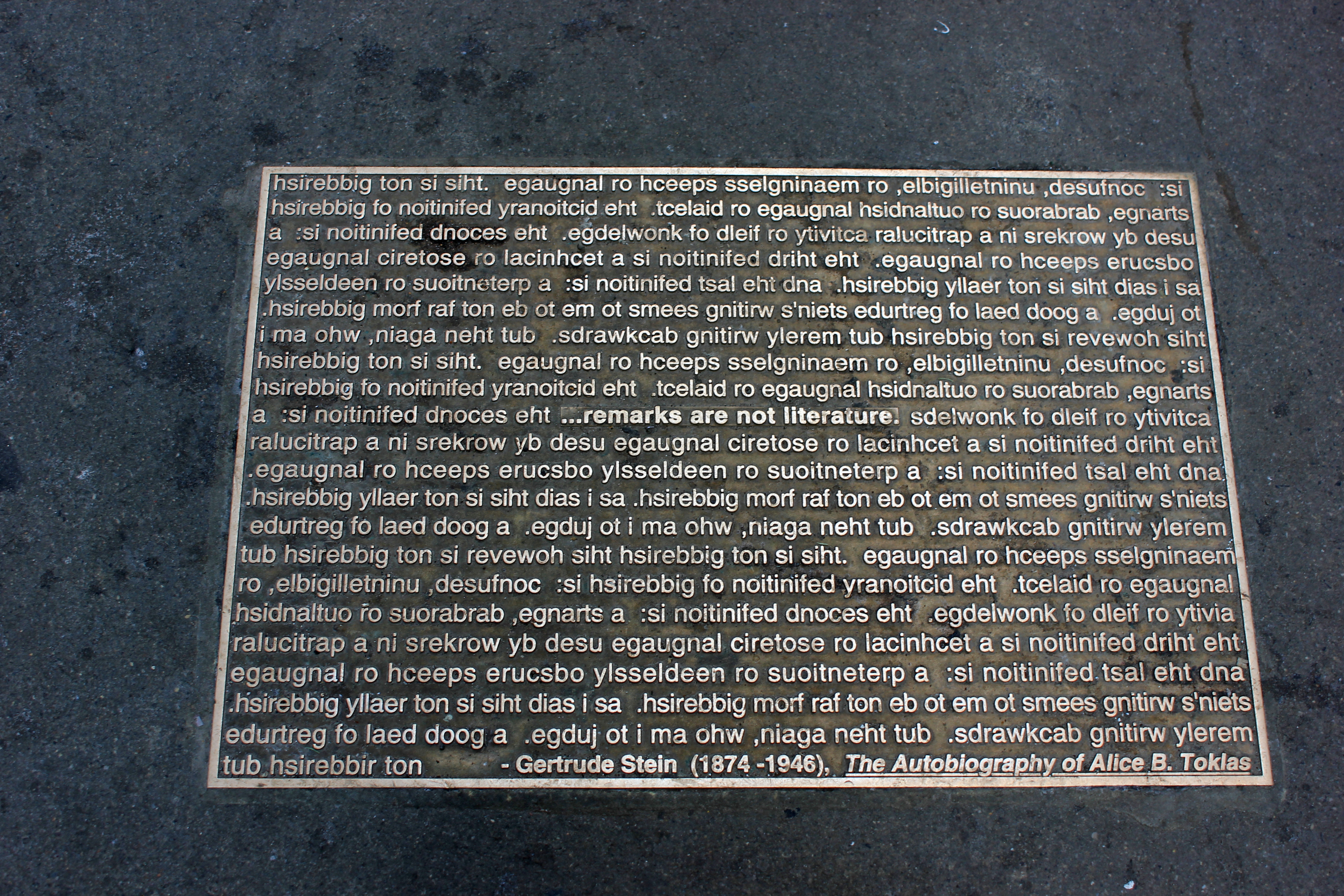
"... remarks are not literature"

== Literary significance and criticism ==
Gertrude Stein admitted to writing the work in six weeks with the aim of making money. However, she did not like writing it for that particular reason, and Alice didn't think it would be a success. It was the first of Stein's writings to be published in the Atlantic Monthly, much to her joy. The magazine published sixty per cent of the book, in four installments.

As for her friends, Carl Van Vechten liked it; Henry McBride thought it was too commercial; Ernest Hemingway called it a "damned pitiful book"; Henri Matisse was offended by the descriptions of his wife; and Georges Braque thought that Stein had misconstrued Cubism. Her brother Leo Stein deemed it a "farrago of lies". The commercial success that came with her book enabled Stein to live a more prosperous lifestyle.

According to Virgil Thomson, who wrote music to libretti written by Stein, the "book is in every way except actual authorship Alice Toklas's book; it reflects her mind, her language, her private view of Gertrude, also her unique narrative powers. Every story in it is told as Alice herself had always told it. ... Every story that ever came into the house eventually got told in Alice's way, and this was its definitive version."

Several critics, including Jeanette Winterson, have noted that in this book Stein created a new literary form, building upon Virginia Woolf's fictional biography Orlando to make her own reinterpretation of the autobiographical genre.

== See also ==
- Gertrude and Alice
