= Marianne's Ice Cream =

Restaurant information
- Established: 1947; 79 years ago 2014; 12 years ago (Aptos)
- Owners: Kelly Dillon and Charlie Wilcox (since 2012)
- Previous owners: Thomas and Lenore Becker (1947–57); Sam and Dorothy Lieberman (1958–2012)
- Food type: Ice cream
- Location: 1020 Ocean St, Santa Cruz; 218 State Park Dr, Aptos, Santa Cruz; Aptos, Santa Cruz, California, 95060 (Santa Cruz); 95003 (Aptos)
- Website: mariannesicecream.com

Marianne's Ice Cream is an ice cream parlor located on Ocean Street in Santa Cruz, California.

== History ==
Marianne's Ice Cream was opened by Thomas and Lenore Becker in 1947 and named for their daughters, Mary-Lee and Annie. The shop had gone through an unknown seller before a real estate agent approached Sam and Dorothy Lieberman about entering the ice cream industry using the building. The Liebermans agreed and bought the property in 1958. In 2012, after 55 years in business and over 250 ice cream flavors created, Sam sold the shop to Kelly Dillon and Charlie Wilcox. In 2014, a satellite location was opened on State Park Drive in Aptos, California.

As of March 2026, they have 105 flavors.

== Reception ==
Cosmopolitan Magazine included Marianne's Ice Cream in a list of 41 "Instagram-worthy" ice cream shops in the United States.
