= Pabst Blue Ribbon THC-infused seltzer =

Carbonated seltzer with THC

- Type: Seltzer
- Manufacturer: Pabst Blue Ribbon
- Introduced: 2020
- Alcohol by volume: 0
- Ingredients: THC, THCV, CBD, CBN
- Website: pabstlabs.com

Pabst Blue Ribbon THC-infused seltzer is a beverage with added THC marketed by Pabst Labs under the Pabst Blue Ribbon brand name since 2020. A review noted that it contains 5 mg of THC per can "meant as a microdose", and induces "a noticeable little buzz". By 2022, Pabst had expanded its cannabis beverages to include root beer, and expanded production facilities in California.
