= Alice B. Toklas =

American artist (1877–1967)

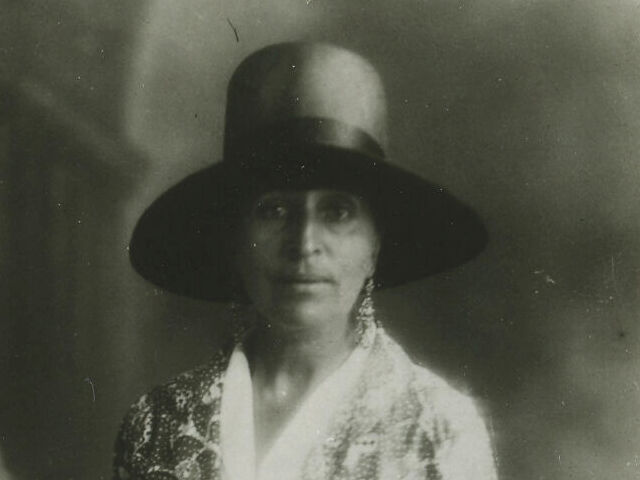
- Alice B. Toklas, 1928
- Born: Alice Babette Toklas; April 30, 1877; San Francisco, California, U.S.
- Died: March 7, 1967 (aged 89); Paris, France
- Resting place: Père Lachaise Cemetery
- Education: University of Washington
- Occupation: Avant-garde
- Partner: Gertrude Stein (1907–1946)

Alice Babette Toklas (April 30, 1877 – March 7, 1967) was an American-born member of the Parisian avant-garde of the early 20th century, and the life partner of American writer Gertrude Stein.

== Early life ==
Alice B. Toklas was born in San Francisco into a middle-class Polish Jewish family. Her paternal grandfather was a rabbi, whose son Feivel (usually known as Ferdinand) Toklas moved to San Francisco in 1863. In 1876, Ferdinand Toklas married Emma (Emelia) Levinsky and they had two children: Alice and her brother Clarence Ferdinand (1887–1924).

In 1890, the Toklas family moved to Seattle, where her father was one half of Toklas, Singerman and Company, the city's leading dry goods store.

Toklas was educated in local schools, which included the Mount Rainier Seminary, and attended the University of Washington where she studied piano.

When her mother became ill, the family moved back to San Francisco. Her mother died in 1897, aged 41.

== Relationship with Gertrude Stein ==
Five months after the devastating 1906 San Francisco earthquake, Toklas left the city and moved to Paris. On September 8, 1907, the day after she arrived in Paris, she met Gertrude Stein. This marked the beginning of a relationship which lasted for nearly four decades, ending in 1946 with Stein's death.

Together they hosted a salon in the home they shared at 27 rue de Fleurus that attracted expatriate American writers, such as Ernest Hemingway, F. Scott Fitzgerald, Paul Bowles, Thornton Wilder, and Sherwood Anderson as well as avant-garde painters, including Picasso, Matisse, and Braque.

Acting as Stein's confidante, lover, cook, secretary, muse, editor, critic, and general organizer, Toklas remained a background figure, chiefly living in the shadow of Stein, until the publication by Stein of Toklas' "memoirs" in 1933 under the teasing title The Autobiography of Alice B. Toklas. It became Stein's best-selling book.

Toklas and Stein drove ambulances in World War I after learning from Parisian taxi drivers.

When World War II broke out in 1939, Stein and Toklas were at their country home, Bilignin, near the Swiss border. Stein and Toklas likely avoided being sent to concentration camps by their obscurity, American citizenship, and the goodness of their neighbors who protected them.

W. G. Rogers wrote in his memoir of the couple, published in 1946, that Toklas "was a little stooped, somewhat retiring and self-effacing. She doesn't sit in a chair, she hides in it; she doesn't look at you, but up at you; she is always standing just half a step outside the circle. She gives the appearance, in short, not of a drudge, but of a poor relation, someone invited to the wedding but not to the wedding feast." James Merrill wrote that before meeting Toklas "one knew about the tiny stature, the sandals, the mustache, the eyes," but he had not anticipated "the enchantment of her speaking voice—like a viola at dusk."

Toklas and Stein remained a couple until Stein's death in 1946.

== Later life, after Stein's death ==
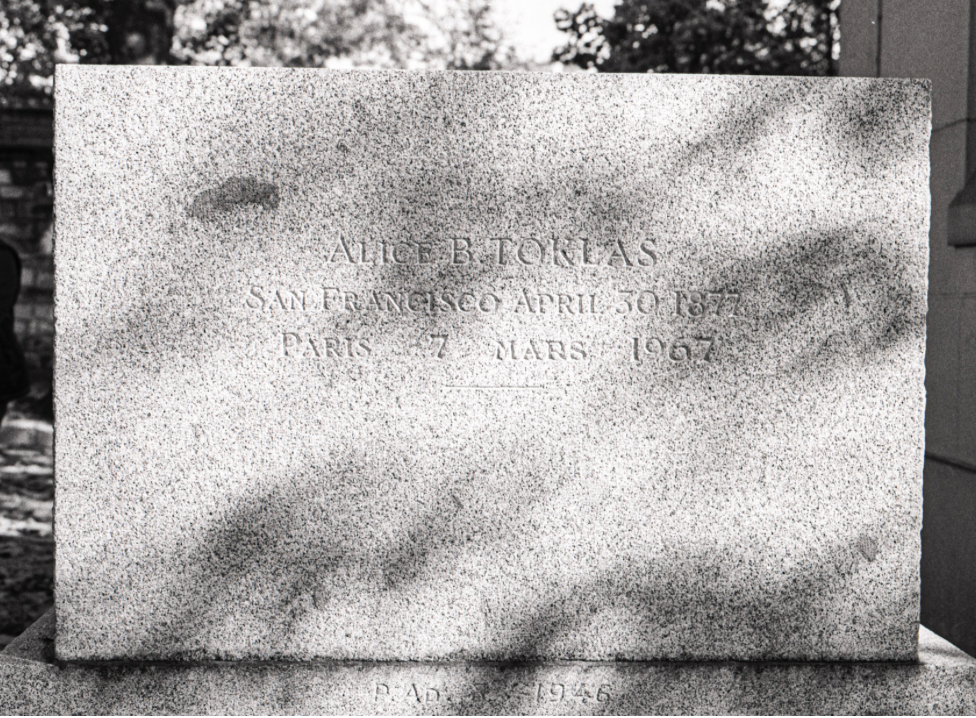
Toklas's name on the reverse side of Gertrude Stein's marker at Père Lachaise Cemetery

Although Gertrude Stein willed much of her estate to Toklas, including their shared art collection (including works of Picasso) housed in their apartment at 5 rue Christine, the couple's relationship had no legal recognition. As many of the paintings appreciated greatly in value, Stein's relatives took action to claim them, eventually removing them from Toklas's residence and placing them in a bank vault while she was away on vacation. Toklas then relied on contributions from friends as well as her writing to make a living.

In 1954, Toklas published The Alice B. Toklas Cookbook, a book that mixes reminiscences and recipes. The most famous recipe, contributed by her friend Brion Gysin, is for "Haschich Fudge", a mixture of fruit, nuts, spices, and "canibus sativa" [sic] or marijuana. The "Haschich Fudge" recipe appeared in the British edition of the book, but it was left out of the first United States edition published by Harper & Brothers. It was included in the second American edition and became popular within the 1960s counterculture movement. She and the recipe were referenced in the 1968 film, I Love You, Alice B. Toklas, starring Peter Sellers, as well as the 1969 Bewitched episode, "Tabitha's Weekend". When Tabitha asked if Endora could have a cookie, Endora asked Phyllis Stephens (Tabitha's other grandmother), "They wouldn't by chance be from an Alice B. Toklas recipe?" The cookbook has been translated into numerous languages.

A second cookbook followed in 1958, Aromas and Flavors of Past and Present. However, Toklas did not approve of it, as it was heavily annotated by Poppy Cannon, an editor at House Beautiful magazine. Toklas also wrote articles for several magazines and newspapers, including The New Republic and The New York Times.

In 1963, Toklas published her autobiography What Is Remembered, which ends abruptly with the death of Stein.

Toklas's later years were very difficult because of poor health and financial problems. She converted to the Catholic Church in 1957. She died in poverty at the age of 89, and is buried next to Stein in Père Lachaise Cemetery, Paris, France; her name is engraved on the back of Stein's headstone.

== Legacy ==
I Love You, Alice B. Toklas is a 1968 film starring Peter Sellers that references Toklas's cannabis brownies, which play a significant role in the plot. Marianne's Ice Cream in Santa Cruz, California, created an ice cream flavor (without cannabis) called "Alice B. Toklas' Fudge Brownie" in honor of the brownies in Sellers' film.

The Alice B. Toklas LGBTQ Democratic Club is a political organization founded in San Francisco in 1971.

Samuel Steward, who met Toklas and Stein in the 1930s, edited Dear Sammy: Letters from Gertrude Stein and Alice B. Toklas (1977), and also wrote two mystery novels featuring Stein and Toklas as characters: Murder Is Murder Is Murder (1985) and The Caravaggio Shawl (1989).

In the 1980s, Jacquie Phelan, a mountain bike racer and founder of the first all-women's mountain biking club, raced under the pseudonym "Alice B. Toe Clips" in reference to Toklas.

The San Francisco Board of Supervisors voted in 1998 to rename a block of Myrtle Street between Polk Street and Van Ness Avenue in San Francisco as Alice B. Toklas Place, since Toklas was born one block away on O'Farrell Street.

Toklas has been portrayed on-screen by Wilfrid Brambell in the 1978 Swedish film The Adventures of Picasso, by Linda Hunt in the 1987 film Waiting for the Moon; by Alice Dvoráková in the 1993 television series The Young Indiana Jones Chronicles; and by Thérèse Bourou-Rubinsztein in the 2011 film Midnight in Paris.

In 2020, artist Maira Kalman, along with her son Alex Kalman, created and published a short film adaptation of The Autobiography of Alice B. Toklas called "My Name is Alice B. Toklas."
