= Ryan Moore (musician) =

Canadian musical artist

- Origin: Vancouver, British Columbia, Canada
- Genres: Dub, reggae, psychedelic rock, post-industrial, synthpop, new wave, electronic, indie rock, pop
- Occupations: Musician, composer, producer, multi-instrumentalist
- Instruments: Bass guitar, drums, guitar, keyboards
- Years active: 1981–present
- Labels: M Records, ROIR, Nettwerk, PIAS, Geffen, Polydor, Soleilmoon, Interchil, Dubhead
- Website: Twilight Circus

Ryan Moore is a Canadian musician known primarily for his dub project Twilight Circus, his long association with the influential experimental electronic rock band, The Legendary Pink Dots and the Tear Garden.

== Early career ==
He began as a bassist in the Vancouver, British Columbia, Canada music scene in the early 1980s. He was active in the nexus forged between punk rock and reggae, taking inspiration from the DIY ethic, which led him to begin his own label, M Records. In the late 1980s, Moore became part of the Nettwerk Records stable of artists and musicians where he remained for several years, working with numerous artists including Skinny Puppy's side project, Hilt, pop artists Lava Hay, Single Gun Theory, Sarah McLachlan, and The Final Cut.

In the early 1990s, he relocated to the Netherlands where he joined the Legendary Pink Dots. In addition to a busy schedule of tours and recording with the Legendary Pink Dots, Moore also recorded with the Tear Garden, Edward Ka-Spel, and Skinny Puppy. He also worked with the Canadian producer Darryl Neudorf's Miller Block studio collective, and released the first record in his dub and reggae project Twilight Circus.

In addition to working as a bass player, Moore toured as a live percussionist with the tribal techno outfit, Exquisite Corpse (from ex-Psychick Warriors ov Gaia member Robert Heynen and Debbie Jones), playing at clubs on the 1990s UK rave scene including London's Megadog, and Pure at Glasgow Barrowlands. A 1996 world tour as additional live drummer with the Skinny Puppy offshoot Download saw Moore moving into the role of live drummer, also on later tours and albums with the Legendary Pink Dots.

== Since 2000 ==
Since 2001, Ryan Moore has primarily been active with Twilight Circus. He also produced artists such as Michael Rose (from the Grammy award-winning Black Uhuru), and collaborated with other artists such as DJ Spooky and Cevin Key. With Twilight Circus, Moore has worked with a number of reggae musicians including, Sly Dunbar, Dean Fraser, Big Youth, Gregory Isaacs, Sugar Minott, Gaudi, Chinna Smith, Vin Gordon, and Ansel Collins.

== Discography ==
=== Twilight Circus ===
- In Dub Vol. 1 (1995)
- Other Worlds Of Dub (1996)
- Bin Shaker Dub (1997)
- Dub Plate Selection (1998)
- Horsie (1999)
- Dub Plates Volume Two (1999)
- Dub Voyage (2000)
- Volcanic Dub (2001)
- Dub Plates Vol 3 (2002)
- The Essential Collection (2002) (compilation)
- Foundation Rockers (2003)
- Dub From The Secret Vaults (2004)
- DJ Spooky That Subliminal Kid vs. Twilight Circus - Riddim Clash (2004)
- Remixed: Dubwise (2004)
- Remixed: Abstract Beats (2004)
- Deeper Roots (2005)
- Rasta International (2006)
- Cultural Roots Showcase (2007)
- Binghi Riddim (2008)
- Vocal Anthology Vol 1 (2008)
- Dub Plate Style Vol 1 Vinyl EP Track Collection (2012)
- Dub Plate Style Vol 2 Vinyl EP Track Collection (2012)
- Fleximix Collection 45's Collection (2012)
- Extended Disco Mixes (2013)

=== Legendary Pink Dots ===
- Shadow Weaver
- Malachai (Shadow Weaver Part 2)
- Nine Lives to Wonder
- From Here You'll Watch the World Go By
- Hallway of the Gods
- Nemesis Online
- A Perfect Mystery
- Remember Me This Way
- Chemical Playschool 8+9
- Chemical Playschool 10
- Chemical Playschool 11+12+13
- Live at the Metro
- Farewell, Milky Way
- Live in Hildesheim 1991
- Live in Montpellier
- Canta Mientras Puedas
- A Guide to the Legendary Pink Dots Vol. 1: The Best Ballads
- El Kaleidoscopio Terminal
- I Did Not Inhale
- A Guide to the Legendary Pink Dots Vol. 2: Psychedelic Classics and Rarities

=== Tear Garden ===
- The Last Man to Fly
- To Be an Angel Blind, the Crippled Soul Divide
- Crystal Mass
- Sheila Liked The Rodeo
- Bouquet of Black Orchids
- For Those Who Would Walk with the Gods
- Eye Spy with My Little Eye

=== Michael Rose ===
- African Roots
- African Dub
- Warrior
- Warrior Dub
- Reggae Legend
- Showdown In A Bloody Town

=== Hilt ===
- Orange Pony
- Journey to the Center Of the Bowl

=== Various artists ===
- Twilight Circus Meets cEvin Key - DUBCON - UFO Pon Di Gullyside
- Edward Ka-Spel Meets Twilight Circus - 800 Saints In A Day
- Gaudi - In Between Times
- Animal Slaves - A Fine End
- Artwork - Artwork
- Brainbox - Primordia
- Brothers And Systems - Transcontinental Weekend
- Cevin Key - Ghost Of Each Room
- Copyright - Circle C
- Childman - Childman
- Darkstar - Travelogue
- Darkstar - Travelogue II
- DNA - Le Draw Dee Kee
- Dub Project - Dub Project
- Dub Project - II
- Dubzap - Pro
- Dead Voices on Air - Piss Frond
- Dead Voices on Air - Live
- Edward Ka-Spel - Chyekk China Doll (Reissue)
- Edward Ka-Spel - Scriptures Of Illumina
- Edward Ka-Spel - Das Digital Vertrauen
- The Final Cut - Consumed
- Lava Hay - Lava Hay
- Lava Hay - With A Picture In Mind
- Lydia Tomkiw - Incorporated
- Muslimgauze - Mort Aux Vaches
- Niels Van Hoorn - Colours
- Single Gun Theory - Millions Like Stars In My Hands
- Ranking Joe - World In Trouble
- Ranking Joe - World In Dub
- Tippy Agogo - Holy Crow
- Tippy Agogo - Incantos
- Uzume Taiko - Chirashi

=== Remixes ===
- DJ Spooky - Variation Cybernetique Remix
- Meat Beat Manifesto - Storm The Dub Mix
- Necessary Intergalactic Cooperation - #1 Dub / Norwegian Headcharge
- Nirgilis - Remix
- Strange Attractor - Rorschach (Twilight Circus Dub Limbo Mix)
- Systemwide - Eyupsultan Remix
- Vibronics - Jah Light Jah Love Remix
- Zion Train - Hailing Up the Selector Remix

=== Video and DVD ===
- Legendary Pink Dots - Live At La Luna (VHS/DVD)
- Legendary Pink Dots - 9 Lives To Wonder - A film by Cevin Key (DVD)
