= The Legendary Pink Dots discography =

- Studio albums: 47
- Live albums: 26
- Compilation albums: 48
- Video albums: 7

This is a detailed list of releases by the European band The Legendary Pink Dots. As of 2012, they have released 32 studio albums, 52 live albums and compilations, and 14 singles. Their first release was the cassette Only Dreaming in 1981, initially limited to 10 copies only, each with their own, handmade cover. After a few more cassette-only releases, Brighter Now saw the light of day in the following year, as their first 'proper' album.

From the start, their output has been quite prolific, with no less than four tapes released in the first year of their existence alone. This would not change until the late nineties, with a new album with original material every 1–2 years only, but accompanied by re-releases of early, hard-to-find material, and live albums.

In addition, singer Edward Ka-Spel has released more than 60 solo albums to date, and he and other members of the band have collaborated in various other projects, most notably in The Tear Garden, which originally consisted of Ka-Spel and cEvin Key of Skinny Puppy, but later expanded to involve all current Pink Dots members as well as several friends of both the Pink Dots and Key.

Another notable peculiarity in the Pink Dots' discography is their affection for vinyl. With only a few exceptions, all of their albums have seen vinyl editions in addition to the standard CD release, many of them (like their 2010 studio album, Seconds Late For The Brighton Line) featuring exclusive tracks not found on the CD, although some may later appear on the digital release.

In their history, The Legendary Pink Dots have released—and re-released—their records on a large number of labels, as well as having their own label, The Terminal Kaleidoscope, and a bandcamp.com page for digital self-distribution.

== Studio releases ==
Year	Title	Label	Format
1981	Only Dreaming	Mirrordot, Jarmusic	Tape
1981	Kleine Krieg	Mirrordot, Terminal Kaleidoscope, 235	Tape
1982	Brighter Now	In Phaze, Art Nouveau, New Europeans, Terminal Kaleidoscope, Play It Again Sam, SPV Poland, Soleilmoon	Tape, LP, CD
1982	Atomic Roses	Illusion Productions	Tape
1982	Premonition	Flowmotion, Ding Dong, 235, Terminal Kaleidoscope, Mirrordot, Jarmusic	Tape
1982	Apparition	Ding Dong, Terminal Kaleidoscope	Tape, LP, CD
1982	Basilisk	Third Mind, Ding Dong, Terminal Kaleidoscope, Mirrordot, Jarmusic, Beta-lactam Ring	Tape, CD
1983	Chemical Playschool 3 & 4	Mirrordot Tapes, Terminal Kaleidoscope, Jarmusic, Staalplaat	2x Tape, 2x CD
1983	Curse	In Phaze, Terminal Kaleidoscope, Play It Again Sam, SPV Poland, Soleilmoon, Big Blue	LP, Tape, CD
1984	The Tower	In Phaze, Terminal Kaleidoscope, Play It Again Sam, SPV Poland, Soleilmoon	LP, CD, Tape
1985	Asylum	Play It Again Sam, Cacciocavallo/Soleilmoon, SPV Poland	2xLP, CD
1985	Prayer For Aradia	Bain Total, Terminal Kaleidoscope, Big Blue	Tape, CD
1986	Island Of Jewels	Play It Again Sam, Penguin, Cacciocavallo/Soleilmoon, SPV Poland	LP, CD
1988	Any Day Now	Play It Again Sam, Wax Trax!, SPV Poland, Cacciocavallo/Soleilmoon	LP, Tape, CD
1989	The Golden Age	Play It Again Sam, Wax Trax!, SPV Poland, Cacciocavallo/Soleilmoon	LP, Tape, CD
1990	Four Days	Mirrordot, Terminal Kaleidoscope, SPV Poland	Tape, CD
1990	Crushed Velvet Apocalypse	Play It Again Sam, Wax Trax!, Caroline, Cacciocavallo/Soleilmoon, SPV Poland	LP, Tape, CD
1991	The Maria Dimension	Play It Again Sam, Caroline, SPV Poland, Cacciocavallo/Soleilmoon	LP, Tape, CD
1992	Shadow Weaver	Play It Again Sam, Caroline, SPV Poland, Cacciocavallo/Soleilmoon	LP, Tape, CD
1992	Malachai (Shadow Weaver Part 2)	Play It Again Sam, Caroline, Cacciocavallo/Soleilmoon, Big Blue	LP, Tape, CD
1994	9 Lives to Wonder	Play It Again Sam, Soleilmoon, Flesh Eating Ants	CD, 2xLP
1995	From Here You'll Watch the World Go By	Soleilmoon, Staalplaat, SPV Poland, Rustblade	CD, Tape, 2xLP
1997	Hallway of the Gods	Soleilmoon, Terminal Kaleidoscope, Staalplaat, SPV Poland	CD, Tape, 2xLP
1998	Nemesis Online	Soleilmoon	CD, 2xLP
2000	A Perfect Mystery	Cacciocavallo/Soleilmoon, Beta-lactam Ring	CD, 2xLP
2002	All the King's Horses	Soleilmoon, Big Blue	CD, 2xLP
2002	All the King's Men	ROIR	CD, 2xLP
2004	Poppy Variations	Terminal Kaleidoscope, Beta-lactam Ring, Big Blue	CD, 2xLP
2004	The Whispering Wall	ROIR	CD
2006	Your Children Placate You from Premature Graves	ROIR	CD
2006	Alchemical Playschool	Caciocavallo	CD, 2x 10" vinyl
2008	Plutonium Blonde	ROIR	CD
2010	Seconds Late for the Brighton Line	ROIR	CD
2012	The Creature That Tasted Sound	Trademark of Quantity	CD-R
2013	Taos Hum	Trademark of Quantity	CD-R
2013	The Gethsemane Option	Metropolis Records	CD
2013	Code Noir	Beta-lactam Ring Records	CD
2013	The Curse of Marie Antoinette	Rustblade	LP
2014	10^{9}	Rustblade	2xLP, CD
2015	The Seismic Bleats Of Quantum Sheep	Self-released on bandcamp.com, Abstrakce Records	Digital download, LP
2015	Five Days	Self-released on bandcamp.com	CDr, Digital download
2015	5 Days Instrumentals	Self-released on bandcamp.com	CDr, Digital download
2016	Pages Of Aquarius	Metropolis Records	CD, 2xLP, Digital download
2018	8118	Des Astres D’Or Records	LP, Digital download
2019	Angel in the Detail	Metropolis Records	CD, 2xLP, Digital download
2022	The Museum Of Human Happiness	Metropolis Records	CD, 2xLP, Digital download
2022	The 13th Step	Self-released on bandcamp.com	Vinyl, CDR, Digital Download

== Compilations ==
Year	Title	Label	Format	Notes
1981	Chemical Playschool 1 & 2	Mirrordot Tapes, Terminal Kaleiddoscope, Jarmusic, Staalplaat	2x Tape	A collection of early tracks, some of them available on other releases from that time. The track listings on later releases differ from the original Mirrordot release, but the tracks are in fact the same, just named differently.
1981	Dots On The Eyes	Cassette King	Tape	March is exclusive to this release, while all other songs appeared on Chemical Playschool 1 & 2.
1987	Stone Circles: A Legendary Pink Dots Anthology	Play It Again Sam USA	LP, CD	Compilation for the US market. All tracks previously released except for Gladiators Version Apocalypse.
1988	Traumstadt 1	Mirrordot Tapes, Terminal Kaleidoscope	Tape, CD	Features tracks that previously appeared on Atomic Roses, Apparition and the various artist compilations Rising From The Red Sand 3, Turkish Delight and I Love Liberty. The version of I Dream Of Jeannie on this release is different from the one appearing on the bonus CD for The Maria Dimension.
1988	Traumstadt 2	Mirrordot, Jarmusic	Tape	Features unreleased tracks and versions as well as the Pink Dots' entries for the various artists compilations Something Stirs, Mineral Composition (Edges 40 Vol. 2), Zamizdat Trade Journal Volume 4, Four In One Vol. 2, Compulsory Overtime and Three Minute Symphony.
1989	Traumstadt 5	Mirrordot, Jarmusic, Staalplaat	Tape	Compilation of material from various Pink Dots releases as well as their entries for the compilations Life At The Top, Insane Music For Insane People Vol. 2 and An Invitation To The Last Judgement: The Labyrinth.
1989	The Legendary Pink Box	Play It Again Sam, Cacciocavallo	3x LP, 2x CD	"Featuring the ancient, the resurrected, re-recorded, the rare and the exclusive".
1995	Chemical Playschool 8 & 9	Terminal Kaleidoscope, Soleilmoon Recordings, Beta-lactam Ring Records	2x CD	Includes the Maria Dimension Bonus CD as well as unreleased tracks and songs recorded for the various artists compilations Sonora 2/91 (magazine with CD), A Drop In The Ocean... and Ohren Des Kaiser Hirohito.
1996	Canta Mientras Puedas	Play It Again Sam, Soleilmoon	CD	All material previously released, with the tracks A Velvet Resurrection and Friend presented in slightly remixed versions. The title of the compilation is the Spanish translation of the Pink Dots' motto "Sing While You May".
1996	Lullabies For The New Dark Ages	Soleilmoon	4x LP, 4x CD	Re-release of the albums Brighter Now, Curse, Faces In The Fire and The Tower as a box-set. 4x LP box is limited to 512 copies and 4x CD box is limited to 1000 copies.
1997	Ancient Daze	Terminal Kaleidoscope, Beta-lactam Ring Records	CD, 2x LP	Collection of material originally released 1980-1981 plus the previously unreleased Spaced Out. Re-released in 2000 with three additional, previously unreleased tracks : Odd, West Side Story (The Forgotten Version) and Candlelight Or Fullbeam?.
1997	Stained Glass Soma Fountains	Soleilmoon	2x CD	Collection of early material and cassette releases as well as tracks made for the compilations The Dice Are Rolling: A Play It Again Sam Records Sample , QED and Flowmotion. According to the liner notes, April's Song "is the oldest surviving recording of The Legendary Pink Dots".
1997	Under Triple Moons	ROIR	CD	Collection of tracks from the cassette releases Premonition, Traumstadt 2, Kleine Krieg and Chemical Playschool 1 & 2.
1998	Chemical Playschool 10	Soleilmoon	CD	New and previously unreleased material. Originally sold exclusively at the Pink Dots' North American tour in 1997, it was later put into general release.
1999	Poi Poka Mozhesh	Brudenia	CD	Collection of previously released material as well as a different version of Supper at J's and the two previously unreleased tracks Interflora Overdrive (Part One) and Interflora Overdrive (Part Two). The album's title is the Russian translation of the Pink Dots' motto "Sing While You May".
2001	Kollabaris	Terminal Kaleidoscope, Beta-lactam Ring Records	CD	Collection of collaborations with other artists, including Artwork, Karolinek and Lydia Tomkiw as well as the side-projects The Tear Garden and Mimir.
2001	Chemical Playschool 11, 12 & 13	Caciocavallo	3x CD	Collection of previously unreleased material (going back as far as 1992) and the tracks 10th Shade and Schatten from the vinyl version of Nemesis Online. All three discs were designed to have no index points (although the third disc erroneously has one near the end) to invoke the experience of listening to a cassette.
2002	Synesthesia	S.P.K.R., Big Blue Records	CD	Described as "a companion to Chemical Playschool 11, 12 & 13", featuring previously unreleased (presumably all newly recorded) material.
2002	El Kaleidoscopo Terminal	Caciocavallo	LP, CD	Collection of previously released material plus a new version of Blue from A Perfect Mystery.
2002	Caciocavallo Reissue Collection	Caciocavallo	10x CD	Box set featuring all albums previously available through Play It Again Sam: The Lovers, Asylum, Island Of Jewels, Any Day Now, The Golden Age, The Legendary Pink Box, The Crushed Velvet Apocalypse, The Maria Dimension, Shadow Weaver and Malachai.
2003	A Guide to the Legendary Pink Dots Vol. 1: The Best Ballads	Big Blue Records	CD	Collection of previously released material.
2003	I Did Not Inhale	Zakat	CD	Compilation for the Russian market containing previously released material.
2003	A Guide To The Legendary Pink Dots Vol. 2: Psychedelic Classics And Rarities	Big Blue Records	2x CD & 1x VCD	Collection of previously released material plus unreleased live versions of the songs The Saucers Are Coming (renamed to Saucers Over Poznan), Citadel, A Velvet Resurrection and I Love You In Your Tragic Beauty, all recorded in Poznan, Poland, in 1996. The Video CD features a live show recorded in Germany on January 11, 1989, as well as an interview two clips of the songs Der Schrei and Talent Contest.
2004	Singe Waehrend Du Bist	UMO Magazine	CD	Collection of previously released songs and unreleased live versions of Space Captain, Andromeda Suite and Evolution / The Brightest Star.
2004	Crushed Mementos	Plinkity Plonk	CD	Collection of tracks taken from the compilations The Voice, Rising From The Red Sands Vol. 3 and Zamizdat Trade Journal, the Pink Dots' Traumstadt 4 cassette, plus a new song called Premonition 15.
2007	The Legendary Pink Dots	Vinyl On Demand	5x LP	LP 1: A Collection Of Tracks From Chemical Playschool 1+2 Part I; LP 2: A Collection Of Tracks From Chemical Playschool 1+2 Part II; LP 3: Kleine Krieg Part I & II; LP 4: Kleine Krieg Part III & IV; LP 5: Live In Cologne 8-4-1983; Limited to 600 copies. Came with a bonus DVD when ordering directly from the label, which featured a TV performance of Echo Police and a short interview.
2009	The Maria Sessions	Trademark Of Quantity	CD	Previously unreleased recordings made in 1991.
2010	Any Day Now Secrets	Trademark Of Quantity	CD	Previously unreleased recordings made in 1987.
2011	All The King's Sessions	Trademark Of Quantity	CD	Outtakes and alternate versions from All The King's Horses and All The King's Men.
2012	Chemical Playschool 15	Rustblade	CD, CDr, DVD	A collection of new tracks recorded in August 2012.
2013	Come Out From the Shadows	self-released on bandcamp.com	Digital download	Previously unreleased recordings made in the 1990s.
2013	Come Out From the Shadows Volume 2	self-released on bandcamp.com	Digital download	Previously unreleased recordings from the Shadow Weaver and Malachai sessions.
2013	Come Out From the Shadows (Volume 3 - The 80s)	self-released on bandcamp.com	Digital download	Previously unreleased recordings made in the 1980s.
2013	The Maria Sessions Volume 2	self-released on bandcamp.com	Digital download	Previously unreleased recordings made in 1991.
2014	12 Steps Off The Path	self-released on bandcamp.com	CDR, Digital download	Songs featured on Various Artists compilations and songs from the bonus disc of Classics & Rarities.
2014	Chemical Playschool 16 & 18	self-released on bandcamp.com, Beta-lactam Ring Records	CDR, Digital download, 2xCD	A collection of new tracks recorded between May and July 2014.
2015	The Shock Exchange	Rustblade	LP	Split release with kETvECTOR.
2016	Chemical Playschool 19 & 20	Beta-lactam Ring Records	2xCD	A collection of new tracks recorded throughout the year 2015.
2016	Festive	Self-released on bandcamp.com	2xCDR	A collection of most of the holiday specials from 2013 to 2015.
2019	40 Angels: The Archive	Self-released on bandcamp.com	CDRs, Digital download, DVDA	"The Archive of The Project of The Angels For The Angels."

== Live albums ==
Year	Title	Label	Format	Notes
1984	The Lovers	Ding Dong Tapes and Records, Torso	LP	Tracks 1-4 recorded live at De Melkweg, Amsterdam, 9/9/1984. Tracks 5-8 recorded for VPRO Radio at Vara Studios, Hilversum, 1984.
1985	The Terminal Kaleidoscope	Ding Dong Tapes and Records, Terminal Kaleidoscope	Tape	Split release with Attrition. Recorded live in Netherlands and Switzerland during their 1984 tour.
1988	Dot-To-Dot	Teddy Bear Music, Jarmusic	Tape	Recorded live in Hannover, Germany, 02/10/1988.
1988	Traumstadt #3	Mirrordot, Jarmusic, Staalplaat	Tape	Recorded at various venues in Germany, Austria, France and Netherlands.
1989	Greetings 9	Materiali Sonori	LP	Side a recorded live at The Ubu Club, Rennes, France, in February 1988. Side b are studio tracks recorded August, 1988. Released on CD as Greetings 9 + Premonition 11 by Materiali Sonori in 1991 and re-released as It's Raining In Heaven by Soleilmoon Recordings in 1996.
1991	Live at Centralino, 15.2.1987, Torino, Italy	Old Europa Cafe	Tape	Originally released as a bootleg, it was later sanctioned by the Legendary Pink Dots. Recorded live at Centralino, Torino, Italy, on February 15, 1987.
1997	Live '85 - '88	Terminal Kaleidoscope, Beta-lactam Ring Records	CD-R	Tracks taken from various live performances.
1997	Live '89	Terminal Kaleidoscope, Beta-lactam Ring Records	CD-R	Recorded at Kling-Klang in Wilhelmshaven, Germany.
1999	Live at the Metro	SPV Poland	CD, Tape	Recorded live at the Cabaret Metro, Chicago, Illinois, US, on November 11, 1998.
2000	Farewell, Milky Way	Caciocavallo	CD	The Pink Dots' final concert at the Melkweg ("Melkweg" is Dutch for "Milky Way") in Amsterdam, the Netherlands, in 1994. The Melkweg had been host to a Pink Dots concert every year since 1984.
2003	Live in Hildesheim 1991	Trademark of Quantity	CD-R	Recorder live at Hildesheim, Germany, on May 8, 1991.
2005	Live at Montpellier 1994	Trademark of Quantity	CD-R	Recorded live in Montpellier, France, on May 27, 1994.
2008	Live at Cafe De La Danse, Paris, 20 December 2007	Trademark of Quantity	CD-R	Limited to 80 copies. Recorded live at Cafe De La Danse, Paris, France, on December 20, 2007.
2009	Human Radio	Trademark of Quantity	CD-R	Recorded at the Studio Desmet cafe, Amsterdam, Netherlands, on May 14, 2002, during a live debate for Human Radio.
2010	The French Collection	Beta-Lactam Ring Records	CD	Recorded in March 1994, at the Theatre Passage du Nord Quest in Paris, the Espace Julien in Marseille and an unnamed venue in Toulouse.
2013	Live At Pandora's Music Box 1985	Self-released on bandcamp.com	Digital download	Recorded live in Rotterdam, Netherlands, on October 10, 1985.
2013	Plutonium Live	Self-released on bandcamp.com	Digital download	Recorded on April 23, 2009, at The Orangerie, Munich. This is a live recording of their Plutonium Blonde tour.
2013	Live in Strasbourg 1986	Self-released on bandcamp.com	Digital download	Live recording from Strasbourg, France, in 1986.
2014	Live '89 Volume 2	Self-released on bandcamp.com	Digital download	Recorded at the Bikini Club in Toulouse, France. This album is the restoration of "A rough cassette that lurked, waiting to be played, in an Ikea basket for a couple of decades".
2014	Paris In The Spring	Self-released on bandcamp.com	Digital download	Recorded in April 2014 at Le Klub in Paris during their Year 33 tour.
2015	Easter In The Deep South	Self-released on bandcamp.com	Digital download	A radio recording of the show at Alabamahalle in Munich, Germany, on 6 April 1985.
2015	The Wednesday Mass	Self-released on bandcamp.com	Digital download	A live recording from Ostrava, Czech Republic, in January 2000.
2015	Crash Velvet Apocalypse	Self-released on bandcamp.com	2xCDr, Digital download	Live recordings from Crash Club, Freiburg, Germany in 1990, and Vienna, Austria in 1991.
2015	Come Out From The Shadows 4-Live At Lounge Ax 1993	Self-released on bandcamp.com	Digital download	Live recording from Chicago, USA in 1993.
2016	A Public Bath	Self-released on bandcamp.com	Digital download	Live recording from Waschhaus in Potsdam, Germany, in 1996.
2016	Intimacy (Live At The Rumba Cafe 2010)	Self-released on bandcamp.com	Digital download	Live recording from Rumba Café, Columbus, Ohio, US, in 2010.
2016	A Sunday In Brighton	Self-released on bandcamp.com	Digital download	Live recording from Brighton, United Kingdom, in 2003.
2019	Live At The Fillmore 1998	Self-released on bandcamp.com	Digital download	Live recording from San francisco, United States, in 1998.
2020	Live In Los Angeles 2019	Self-released on bandcamp.com	Digital download	Live recording from Los Angeles, United States, in 2019.
2020	Live At WFMU 2010	Self-released on bandcamp.com	Digital download	Live recording from New York, United States, in 2020.
2020	Live In Kontich 1986 (Divine Providence Flamande)	Fractal Records	CDr	Live recording from Kontich, Belgium, in 2000.
2025	Live at the Rave, Milwaukee 20 June 2000	Self-released on bandcamp.com	Digital download	Live recording from Milwaukee, United States, in 2000.

== Singles and EPs ==
Year	Song	Album	Label	Format
1984	Faces In the Fire	none	Play It Again Sam, Soleilmoon, SPV Poland	12", CD, audio cassette
1986	Curious Guy	none	Play It Again Sam	12"
1987	Premonition 11	none	Snowdonia	7"
1988	Under Glass	none	Play It Again Sam	12"
1988	Traumstadt 4	none	Mirrordot, Jarmusic, Staalplaat	Audio cassette
1989	Blacklist	The Golden Age	Play It Again Sam	12"
1990	Princess Coldheart	The Crushed Velvet Apocalypse	Play It Again Sam, Wax Trax!	12"
1994	Siren	9 Lives to Wonder	Acid Visions	VHS
1994	Tryst 7	none	Ubuibi	Audio cassette
1996	Remember Me This Way	From Here You'll Watch the World Go By	Soleilmoon	CD
1997	Sterre	Hallway of the Gods	SPV Poland	CD, audio cassette
1998	Pre-Millennial Single	none	Soleilmoon	CD, 12"
2006	Legacy	none	Some Fine Legacy	7"
2013	The Legendary Pink Dots' Christmas Album	none	Self-released on bandcamp.com	Digital download
2014	The Legendary Pink Dots Hallowe'en Special 2014	none	Self-released on bandcamp.com	Digital download
2014	The Legendary Pink Dots' Yuletide Special 2014	none	Self-released on bandcamp.com	Digital download
2015	We'll Get Around To You	none	Dadaïsm Neuf 9 Neuf	7"
2015	The Legendary Pink Dots Hallowe'en Special 2015	none	Self-released on bandcamp.com	Digital download
2015	The Legendary Pink Dots Christmas Special 2015	none	Self-released on bandcamp.com	Digital download
2016	A Scented Candle	none	Noise Noise Noise Records	12" Vinyl
2018	The Legendary Pink Dots' Hallowe'en Special 2017	none	Self-released on bandcamp.com	Digital download
2017	THE LEGENDARY PINK DOTS' CHRISTMAS SPECIAL 2017	none	Self-released on bandcamp.com	Digital download
2018	The Tunnel	none	Noise Noise Noise Records	12" Vinyl
2018	The Legendary Pink Dots' Hallowe'en Special 2018	none	Self-released on bandcamp.com	Digital download
2018	The Legendary Pink Dots' Christmas Special 2018	none	Self-released on bandcamp.com	Digital download
2019	Junkyard (Version Apocalypse) / Mantis Mantra	none	Self-released on bandcamp.com	7" Vinyl

== Videos ==
Year	Title	Label	Format	Notes
1989	Live in Dallas - April 20, 1989	Videophile Magazine	VHS	Recorded live at Trees in Dallas, Texas, USA on April 20, 1989.
1998	Live at La Luna	Soleilmoon	VHS/DVD	Recorded live at La Luna in Portland, Oregon, USA on September 13, 1997.
2005	A Dream is a Dream is a Dream	Beta-Lactam Ring Records	DVD	Recorded live at De Vrije Vloer in Utrecht, Netherlands on January 21, 1987.
2007	Key Club, West Hollywood, Los Angeles 14/11/2002	Trademark of Quantity	DVD-R	Recorded live at The Key Club in West Hollywood, California, USA on November 14, 2002.
2009	Maria Dimension Tour 1991	Terminal Kaleidoscope	DVD-R	Recorded live at Doornroosje in Nijmegen, Netherlands on May 28, 1991.
2011	Paris in The Fall	Soleilmoon	DVD	Recorded live at Le Klub in Paris, France, on November 13, 2009.
2014	The more it changes	Trademark of Quantity	DVD	Recorded live in Tel Aviv in June 2013. This show features the former member Patrick Q. Wright on violins.
