= Chemical Playschool 10 =

Studio album by The Legendary Pink Dots
- Released: 1997
- Recorded: 1992–1997
- Genre: Electronic
- Length: 68:36
- Label: Soleilmoon Recordings
- Producer: Edward Ka-Spel, Frank Verschuuren

The Legendary Pink Dots chronology
Hallway of the Gods (1997)	Chemical Playschool 10 (1997)	Nemesis Online (1998)

Professional ratings
Review scores
Source	Rating
Allmusic	3/5 stars

Chemical Playschool 10 is an album of old and new unreleased material and a previous version of The Saucers Are Coming from Hallway of the Gods. It was released by The Legendary Pink Dots in 1997.

== Track listing ==
No.	Title	Length
1.	"Scarlet Wish"	5:39
2.	"Inside"	6:27
3.	"Colour Wheel"	2:46
4.	"The Disaster Area"	3:53
5.	"Nouveaux Modes Exotiques"	7:16
6.	"Glasshouse"	2:12
7.	"Glasshouse"	1:33
8.	"The Man With The Cut-Glass Heart"	6:00
9.	"Little Romeo"	3:24
10.	"Kleine Juliet"	5:03
11.	"Saucers #1"	8:14
12.	"Premonition 19"	8:21
13.	"Wonderdome"	7:48
Total length:		1:08:36

== Personnel ==
- Qa'Sepel – vocals, keyboards, drones, effects, tapes
- Silverman (Phil Knight) – keyboards
- Niels van Hoornblower – horns, flute
- Martijn de Kleer – acoustic & electric guitar, bass, drums
- Ryan Moore – bass, drums
- Edwin von Trippenhof – electric guitar
- Frank Verschuuren – sound devices, effects
- cEvin Key – drums on Nouveaux Modes Exotiques
