= Stained Glass, Soma Fountains =

Compilation album by The Legendary Pink Dots
- Released: 1997
- Genre: Experimental, Electronic, Psychedelic rock
- Label: Soleilmoon Recordings
- Producer: The Legendary Pink Dots

The Legendary Pink Dots chronology
Under Triple Moons (1997)	Stained Glass, Soma Fountains (1997)	Nemesis Online (1998)

Professional ratings
Review scores
Source	Rating
Allmusic	3/5 stars

Stained Glass, Soma Fountains is a compilation album by the Legendary Pink Dots, issued in 1997 on Soleilmoon Records. The album covers several tracks from the group's early career; some were previously released on small and independent labels, while others were private demos.

It was originally intended for these songs to be included as bonus tracks on Soleilmoon's CD reissues of the early Legendary Pink Dots albums, but contractual reasons prevented this.

"April's Song" dates from 1980, when the group was still known as One Day.

== Track listing ==
1. A Pale Green Introduction/Love on a Pale Green Postage Stamp
2. Premonition 12
3. Mmmmmmmmmmmm ... (first version)
4. The Lifesucker
5. The Divorce
6. Jungle (first version)
7. The Haunted Supermarket
8. No Bell No Prize
9. Plague 2
10. Find The Lady
11. Judith A Hum/Praum Naizh/A Pale Green Sequel
12. Suicide Pact
13. Waiting For The Call/You 'n' Me
14. April's Song
15. Frosty
16. Defeated
17. A Message From Our Sponsor (first version)
18. Ice Baby Cometh
19. Hanging Gardens (Flow Motion version)
20. Jack/Thursday Night Fever #1/Die With Your Eyes On/Opus Dei
21. Premonition 18 (part one)
22. Premonition 18 (part two)

== Personnel ==
- Edward Ka-Spel: keyboards, vocal
- The Silverman (Phil Knight): keyboards
