= The Lovers (album) =

Live album by The Legendary Pink Dots
- Released: 1984
- Recorded: 1984 (Amsterdam and Hilversum)
- Genre: Experimental
- Length: 59:48
- Label: Ding Dong, Torso (Netherlands); Soleilmoon (US)

The Legendary Pink Dots chronology
Chemical Playschool 3 & 4 (1983)	The Lovers (1984)	The Terminal Kaleidoscope (1985)

Professional ratings
Review scores
Source	Rating
Allmusic	3.5/5 stars

The Lovers is a 1984 live album by The Legendary Pink Dots.

== Track listing ==
No.	Title	Length
1.	"MMMMMMMMMMMM..."	5:14
2.	"Geisha Mermaid"	3:12
3.	"The Heretic"	3:16
4.	"Jungle"	9:01
5.	"The Lovers (Part 1)"	5:50
6.	"Silverture"	1:27
7.	"Flowers For the Silverman"	7:44
8.	"The Lovers (Part 2)"	7:04
9.	"Curious Guy" (*)	5:35
10.	"Premonition 16" (*)	11:25
Total length:		59:48

(*) Included on CD releases only - taken from the Curious Guy 12".

== Personnel ==
- Edward Ka-Spel - voice, keyboards
- The Silverman (Phil Knight) - keyboards
- Stret Majest (Barry Gray) - guitar
- Roland Calloway - bass guitar
- Patrick Q Paganini (Patrick Wright) - violin, piano
- Lady Sunshine (Marylou Busch) - lady voice

== Notes ==
- Tracks 1 through 4 recorded live at De Melkweg, Amsterdam, September 9, 1984. Tracks 5 through 8 recorded for VPRO Radio at Vara Studios, Hilversum, 1984.
- Initial release by Ding Dong was limited to 2,000 copies. All releases contain different covers.
