= Alchemical Playschool =

Studio album by The Legendary Pink Dots
- Released: 2006
- Genre: Experimental
- Label: Caciocavallo, Soleilmoon
- Producer: Legendary Pink Dots, Raymond Steeg

The Legendary Pink Dots chronology
Poppy Variations (2004)	Alchemical Playschool (2006)	Your Children Placate You From Premature Graves (2006)

Alchemical Playschool is a 2006 album by The Legendary Pink Dots.

== Track listing ==
1. "Part One"
2. "Part Two"
3. "Part Three"
4. "Part Four"

== Notes ==
Limited to 400 copies packaged in a cloth bag inside a soap stone box with trident symbol etched into the stone. Also available as a 2x10" box and a regular CD.

== Personnel ==
- Edward Ka-Spel – voice, keyboards
- The Silverman – keyboards, electronics
- Martijn De Kleer – guitar, bass, drums
- Niels van Hoorn – saxophone, flute
- Raymond Steeg – production, mastering
