= The Brown Acid Caveat =

2017 studio album by the Tear Garden

Studio album by The Tear Garden
- Released: July 7, 2017
- Recorded: 2016–2017
- Genre: Psychedelic
- Length: 1:16:00
- Label: Subconscious Communications, Metropolis Records

The Tear Garden chronology
Crystal Mass (2000)	The Brown Acid Caveat (2017)

The Brown Acid Caveat is the seventh full-length album by the experimental rock group the Tear Garden released on July 7, 2017 after starting a successful PledgeMusic campaign in August 2016. The campaign, which achieved 117% of its financial goal, allowed for the inclusion of a number of guest musicians including Dre Robinson and former Legendary Pink Dots members Ryan Moore, Martijn De Kleer, and Patrick Q. Wright. The album title refers to an announcement given to spectators of the first Woodstock Festival in 1969 to avoid "brown acid" -- a type of LSD reportedly associated with bad trips.

== Track listing ==
1. "Strange Land" – 5:44
2. "Stars on the Sidewalk" – 7:32
3. "Amy's Personality" – 6:29
4. "Calling Time" – 4:28
5. "On with the Show" – 7:23
6. "Sinister Science" – 7:26
7. "Lola's Rock" – 5:58
8. "Kiss Don't Tell" – 7:42
9. "A Private Parade" – 7:09
10. "The Sound of Space Escaping" – 5:26
11. "Seven Veils" – 7:10
12. "Object" – 4:19

== Personnel ==
Credits adapted from liner notes of The Brown Acid Caveat.

=== The Tear Garden ===
- cEvin Key – bass, devices, drums, keyboards, percussion
- Edward Ka-Spel – keyboards, vocals

=== Additional musicians ===
- Ryan Moore – bass
- Martijn De Kleer – guitar
- Patrick Q. Wright – viola, violin
- Dre Robinson – percussion
- Alice – voices

=== Technical personnel ===
- Greg Reely – mastering, mixing
- Peter Clarke – artwork
- Simon Paul – assembly
