= Hallway (disambiguation) =

A hallway is a long interior corridor.

Hallway may also refer to:

== Architecture ==
- Lobby (room), an entrance hall

== Music ==
- Hallway Productionz, music production duo
- Grand Hallway, American rock band from Seattle
- Hallways (Homeboy Sandman album) 2014
- Hallway of the Gods, album by The Legendary Pink Dots 1997
- "Hallways", song by Australian band Something for Kate from Beautiful Sharks 1999

== Other ==
- The Hallway (play), 2026 American play written by Bill Keenan
