= Eye Spy with My Little Eye =

2002 compilation album by the Tear Garden

Compilation album by The Tear Garden
- Released: 2002
- Genre: Psychedelic
- Length: 55:39
- Label: Subconscious
- Producer: The Tear Garden

The Tear Garden chronology
Crystal Mass (2000)	Eye Spy with My Little Eye (2002)	The Secret Experiment (2007)

Eye Spy with My Little Eye is a 2002 compilation album by the Tear Garden, and the sixth release in Subconscious Communications' "From the Vault" series. It includes unreleased tracks, demos, and outtakes, some from as early as the mid-1980s, recorded throughout the band's career up to that point.

== Track listing ==
1. Perforated Man – 5:18
2. A Bitter Pill – 5:57
3. The Train to China – 2:37
4. Extract from Empathy #2 – 9:34
5. Splatterflick – 12:02
6. Black Curtains – 4:20
7. The Bomb Bomb Loopapa Tribe Drown Themselves in a Vat of Marmite – 4:48
8. All the Stars Are Falling – 5:18
9. Extract from Empathy #3 – 1:55
10. Dr. Chang's Tummy Rub – 3:50

== Track notes ==
"Extract From Empathy #2" and "Extract From Empathy #3" are additional fragments taken from The Empathy Session, with previous fragments having been included on The Last Man to Fly and Sheila Liked the Rodeo.

"Dr. Chang's Tummy Rub" was originally titled "Changer." The newer name is dedicated to one of cEvin's pet cats, Chang (1996-2002).

The word "drown" was misprinted as "down" for the track "The Bomb Bomb Loopapa Tribe Drown Themselves in a Vat of Marmite" on initial pressings of the album. The title of this track is related to the Legendary Pink Dots song "The Bomb Bomb Loopapa Tribe Go to Swansea and Eat It."
