= Seconds Late for the Brighton Line =

Studio album by The Legendary Pink Dots
- Released: 2010
- Genre: Electronic
- Length: 1:06:23
- Label: Reach Out International Records
- Producer: Raymond Steeg, The Legendary Pink Dots

The Legendary Pink Dots chronology
Plutonium Blonde (2008)	Seconds Late for the Brighton Line (2010)	The Creature That Tasted Sound (2012)

Seconds Late for the Brighton Line is a 2010 album by The Legendary Pink Dots released on CD and black vinyl double LP. The LP has an additional live track from a 2009 performance in Germany, featured as the entirety of side D. In November 2013, the album was released on Bandcamp with an additional bonus track.

== Track listings ==
=== CD ===
No.	Title	Length
1.	"Russian Roulette"	5:58
2.	"Endless Time"	5:24
3.	"Leap of Faith"	7:05
4.	"Radiation Day"	6:01
5.	"God and Machines"	6:36
6.	"No Star too Far"	9:34
7.	"Someday"	5:50
8.	"Hauptbahnhof 20:10"	6:55
9.	"Ascension"	13:00
Total length:		1:06:23

=== LP ===
No.	Title	Length
1.	"Russian Roulette"	5:58
2.	"Endless Time"	5:24
3.	"Leap of Faith"	7:05
4.	"Radiation Day"	6:01
5.	"God and Machines"	6:36
6.	"No Star too Far"	9:34
7.	"Someday"	5:50
8.	"Hauptbahnhof 20:10"	6:55
9.	"Ascension"	13:00
10.	"Torchsong / Cubic Caesar"	17:40
Total length:		1:24:03

=== MP3 ===
No.	Title	Length
1.	"Russian Roulette"	5:58
2.	"Endless Time"	5:24
3.	"Leap of Faith"	7:05
4.	"Radiation Day"	6:01
5.	"God and Machines"	6:36
6.	"No Star too Far"	9:34
7.	"Someday"	5:50
8.	"Hauptbahnhof 20:10"	6:55
9.	"Ascension"	13:00
10.	"Torchsong / Cubic Caesar"	17:40
11.	"Seeds of Faith"	35:24
Total length:		1:59:27

== Credits ==
- Edward Ka-Spel - vocals, synthesizers, keyboards, devices
- The Silverman (Phil Knight) - synthesizers, keyboards, devices, percussion, vocals on "Someday"
- Erik Drost - electric, acoustic, bass and Hawaiian guitars
- Raymond Steeg - mixing and engineering

== References/External links ==
Artist page on ROIR Album page at Discogs
