= Shadow Weaver =

Shadow Weaver may refer to:

- Shadow Weaver (The Legendary Pink Dots album), 1992
- Shadow Weaver (The Choir album), 2014
- Shadow Weaver (character), a fictional character in She-Ra: Princess of Power and She-Ra and the Princesses of Power
