= Twilight Circus Dub Sound System =

Dub project of musician Ryan Moore

Twilight Circus
- Origin: Vancouver, British Columbia, Canada
- Genres: Reggae, dub, sound systems
- Years active: 1995–present
- Labels: M Records, Fleximix, ROIR, Interchill, Dubhead, Nettwerk, Sony Music Japan
- Members: Ryan Moore
- Website: http://www.twilightcircus.com

Twilight Circus is the dub and reggae project of multi-instrumentalist Ryan Moore, former bassist and drummer of the Legendary Pink Dots. Twilight Circus is becoming increasingly popular and well known for Moore's work with artists such as Big Youth, Michael Rose of Black Uhuru and Ranking Joe. He originally started off producing dub albums, before recording vocalists for inclusion on his critically acclaimed Foundation Rockers album. In the classic tradition of reggae, Moore releases 10" vinyl record singles, often in limited edition.

With Twilight Circus, Ryan Moore has worked with a wide range of respected figures from the dub, reggae and electronic genres including: Sly and Robbie, Dean Fraser, Luciano, Michael Rose (Black Uhuru), Mikey General, Big Youth, Skully Simms, Vin Gordon (The Wailers), Gaudi, Earl "Chinna" Smith (The Wailers), Eddie 'Tan Tan' Thornton (Aswad), Buttons Tenyue /Matics Horns (UB40), Ansel Collins, Style Scott (Dub Syndicate), Bobby Ellis (Studio One), Admiral Tibet, Jah Stitch, Sugar Minott, Queen Ifrica, Lutan Fyah, Fred Locks, Gregory Isaacs, Mafia & Fluxy, Cevin Key (Skinny Puppy), DJ Spooky, and The Mad Professor.

Moore's fascination with dub began in the early 1980s, inspired by the nexus of punk rock and dub which film maker Don Letts forged in London, along with the futuristic possibilities hinted at by cyberpunk author William Gibson in Neuromancer. Throughout the 80's he obsessively collected every dub LP he could find, which included Jamaican dub from legends like King Tubby, Prince Jammy, Lee Perry and Scientist as well as 2nd-generation figures operating from London like Adrian Sherwood, Mad Professor, and Jah Shaka. Some of his early dub experiments from the mid-80's are to be heard on the ROIR release 'Twilight Circus - Dub From The Secret Vaults'.

In 1994 Vancouver's Miller Block studio collective, owner / operator Darryl Neudorf handed Ryan Moore the keys to the studio for after hours sessions, where the first Twilight Circus album Ín Dub Vol.1 began to take shape. From 1994 to the present Moore has made recordings for Twilight Circus in Vancouver, London, Kingston-Jamaica, and The Netherlands - where he had his own studio.

Since being the opening act for Skinny Puppy side project Download on their 1996 World tour and several tours billed with the Legendary Pink Dots, Twilight Circus has maintained a busy schedule playing all over the World on nearly every continent, including major festivals like Dour Festival, Summerjam, Fuji Rock Festival, One Love (UK), Asagiri Jam, Sierra Nevada World Music Festival, Vancouver Folk Music Festival.

== Discography ==
=== Albums ===
- In Dub Vol. 1 (1995)
- Other Worlds Of Dub (1996)
- Bin Shaker Dub (1997)
- Dub Plate Selection (1998)
- Horsie (1999)
- Dub Plates Volume Two (1999)
- Dub Voyage (2000)
- Volcanic Dub (2001)
- Dub Plates Vol 3 (2002)
- The Essential Collection (2002)
- Foundation Rockers (2003)
- Dub From The Secret Vaults (2004)
- The Dub Project - The Dub Project (2004)
- DJ Spooky That Subliminal Kid vs. Twilight Circus Dub Sound System - Riddim Clash (2004)
- Remixed: Dubwise (2004)
- Remixed: Abstract Beats (2004)
- Deeper Roots (2005)
- Rasta International (2006)
- Cultural Roots Showcase (2007)
- The Dub Project - 2 (2007)
- Binghi Riddim (2008)
- Vocal Anthology Vol 1 (2008)
- Dub Plate Style Vol 1 Vinyl EP Track Collection (2012)
- Dub Plate Style Vol 2 Vinyl EP Track Collection (2012)
- Fleximix Collection 45's Collection (2012)
- Extended Disco Mixes (2013)
- Twilight Circus Meets cEvin Key - DUBCON - UFO Pon Di Gullyside (2013)
- Edward Ka-Spel Meets Twilight Circus - 800 Saints In A Day (2013)

=== Produced by Twilight Circus ===
- Ranking Joe - World In Trouble (2005)
- Michael Rose - African Roots (2005)
- Michael Rose - African Dub (2005)
- Ranking Joe - World In Dub (2006)
- Michael Rose - Warrior (2006)
- Michael Rose - Warrior Dub (2007)
- Michael Rose - Reggae Legend (2012)

=== Singles ===
- Dub Voyage (45) - Dubhead/Shiver
- Ranking Joe - Don't Try To Use Me - Fleximix 1001
- Michael Rose - Days Of History - Fleximix 1002
- Luciano - What We Got To Do - Fleximix 1003
- Ranking Joe - World In Trouble - Fleximix 1004
- Mykal Rose - Wicked Run - Fleximix 1005
- Natural Black - Are You Ready - Fleximix 1006
- Ranking Joe - World In Trouble (Vibronics Remix) - Fleximix 1007
- Michael Rose - Throw Some Stone (Disciples Remix) - Fleximix 1008

=== 10 inch singles and EPs ===
- U.K. Steppers E.P. (M Records 128)
- Session/Stompa 10 (Dubhead/Shiver DBHDS 006)
- Deeper Roots 10 - Big Youth 'Love Is What We Need' (M Records 230)
- Deeper Roots 10 - Luciano 'What We Got To Do' (M Records 240)
- Groove Corporation meets Twilight Circus Disco Roots Dub (M Records 260)
- Deeper Roots 10 - Mykal Rose 'Throw Some Stone' / Ranking Joe 'Don't Follow Babylon' (M Records 270)
- Rob Smith Meets Twilight Circus 'Jungle Dub Rasta' (M Records 280)
- Brother Culture - Foundation Rockers 10 (M Records 340)
- DJ Spooky / Twilight Circus / Alter Echo - Dub Summit EP / Picture Disc (M Records 330)
- Michael Rose & Ranking Joe - Manasseh Meets Blood And Fire 10 (M Records 350)
- Michael Rose / Vin Gordon / Brother Culture - Better Mus Come 10 (M Records 390)
- Big Youth - Lion's Den 10 (M Records 400)
- Lutan Fyah / Brando / Michael Rose / Skully - Binghi Riddim 10 (M Records 430)
- Fred Locks, Queen Ifrica, Matics Horns, Twilight Crew - Thanks & Praise Riddim 10 (M Records 440)
- Cornell Campbell - Acetate Riddim 10 (M Records 460)
- Fred Locks, Ranking Joe, Twilight Crew - Wisdom Riddim 10 (M Records 470)
- Vibronics Meets Twilight Circus – Rewind & Remix Vol.4 (Scoops 019)

=== Compilation albums ===
- A Dubbers Guide (Dubhead)
- AKA Dub (Lush Records)
- AKA Dub 2nd Chapter (Lush Records)
- A New Breed Of Dub: Issue Two (Dubhead)
- A New Breed Of Dub: Issue Three (Dubhead)
- Brain In The Wire (Brainwashed)
- Convergence (OM/XLR8R)
- Crooklyn Dub Vol 3 (Wordsound)
- Docking Sequence (BSI)
- Dubhead Soundclash Series One (Dubhead)
- Dubhead Vol 3 (Dubhead)
- Global Explorer (Zip Dog)
- Lockers (ERS)
- Magnetic Blue (Interchill)
- Onder Stroom (Waaghaals)
- One Dub (Interchill)
- Serenity Dub 4.1 (Incoming!)
- Suitable 2 - The Dub Adventurers (Suiteque)
- Sun Runners (ISM)
- Sushi Dub (Vitaminic)
- Time Machine (Time Machine)
- Transitions (ISM)
- Twilight World (Sony Music Japan)
- Wreck This Mess (BSI)

=== Remixes ===
- DJ Spooky - Variation Cybernetique Remix
- Meat Beat Manifesto - Storm The Dub Mix
- Necessary Intergalactic Cooperation - #1 Dub / Norwegian Headcharge
- Nirgilis - Remix
- Strange Attractor - Rorschach (Twilight Circus Dub Limbo Mix)
- Systemwide - Eyupsultan Remix
- Vibronics - Jah Light Jah Love Remix
- Zion Train - Hailing Up the Selector Remix
