= Brighter Now =

Studio album by The Legendary Pink Dots
- Released: December 7, 1982
- Length: 44:25
- Label: In Phaze (UK); Art Nouveau (Greece); Terminal Kaleidoscope/Play It Again Sam (Belgium); SPV (Poland); Soleilmoon (US)

The Legendary Pink Dots chronology
Kleine Krieg (1981)	Brighter Now (1982)	Atomic Roses (1982)

Professional ratings
Review scores
Source	Rating
Allmusic	3/5 stars

Brighter Now is a 1982 album by The Legendary Pink Dots. The album was rereleased in 2008. Ned Raggett off Allmusic noted that "the sound is certainly among the roughest and sparest of any LPD release, and in many ways is a tentative effort that is more a product of its time than anything else." It was released as a cassette before its official LP release in 1982. In Phaze's initial cassette release was limited to 300 copies, with two different covers. The Art Nouveau edition is limited to 60 copies, and is a split release with the LPD's on one side and Portion Control's Gaining Momentum LP on the other. The In Phaze LP edition is limited to 1,000 copies, while their cassette version is a promo featuring an LPD textual discography, as well as a short story by Edward. All Terminal Kaleidoscope/PIAS editions have a slightly different cover from the original, while the Soleilmoon edition features new cover artwork and a lyric booklet.

== Track listing ==
No.	Title	Length
1.	"Red Castles"	3:28
2.	"Louder After 6"	5:06
3.	"The Wedding" (*)	4:06
4.	"Apocalypse Then"	7:24
5.	"Legacy"	3:18
6.	"City Ghosts"	5:42
7.	"Hanging Gardens"	6:14
8.	"Soma Bath" (*)	3:48
9.	"Premonition 4" (*)	5:19
Total length:		44:25

(*) Tracks included on later releases; not included on initial cassette releases.

== Personnel ==
- Edward Ka-Spel – vocals
- M 019 (Michael Marshall) – keyboards, guitar
- Phil Harmonix (Phil Knight) – tapes
- Rolls Another One (Roland Calloway) – bass
- Rik Chevrolet – guitar
- Keith Thompson – drums
- May B. Irma Mazed (April White) – keyboards
