= Tired Eyes Slowly Burning =

Studio album by the Tear Garden
- Released: 1987
- Recorded: 1985 (track 6), 1986 (tracks 7–10), June 7–8, 1987 (tracks 1–6)
- Studio: Mushroom Studios, Vancouver
- Genre: Psychedelic; electronic
- Length: 69:58
- Label: Nettwerk
- Producer: cEvin Key; Dave Ogilvie

The Tear Garden chronology
Tired Eyes Slowly Burning (1987)	The Last Man to Fly (1992)

Professional ratings
Review scores
Source	Rating
AllMusic	4/5 stars
Calgary Herald	Favorable
The Province	Favorable

Tired Eyes Slowly Burning is the debut album of the Canadian band the Tear Garden, released in 1987 through Nettwerk Music Group. It is the band's first studio album, preceded by their self-titled EP, released a year prior. That EP is appended to the end of Tired Eyes Slowly Burning as tracks 7 through 10.

== Critical reception ==
AllMusic critic Sean Carruthers wrote, "it mixes together to create a dreamy electronic mix that owes something to both Skinny Puppy and the Legendary Pink Dots, but is nonetheless totally different. Think Pink Floyd on a scary electronic acid trip and you're getting close." James Muretich of the Calgary Herald felt the album was more enjoyable than the output of Edward Ka-Spel and cEvin Key's respective bands at the time, and said that it "engrosses the senses with its eerie but enticing psychedelic/electronic sound". Tom Harrison of The Province likened the album to the work of Pink Floyd and praised the two musicians for leaving their comfort zone to produce an album that he thought was "palpably romantic."

== Track listing ==
All songs written by cEvin Key and Edward Ka-Spel.

No.	Title	Length
1.	"Deja Vu"	4:48
2.	"Room with a View"	6:06
3.	"Coma"	4:10
4.	"Valium"	5:38
5.	"You and Me and Rainbows" (Parts One to Six)	16:46
6.	"Oo Ee Oo"	5:16
7.	"The Center Bullet"	9:46
8.	"Ophelia"	8:36
9.	"Tear Garden"	4:50
10.	"My Thorny Thorny Crown"	3:57
Total length:		69:58

== Personnel ==
Personnel adapted from liners notes.

The Tear Garden

- Edward Ka-Spel – lyrics, vocals, music
- cEvin Key – lyrics, music, engineering, mixing

Additional musicians

- Dwayne Goettel – keyboards (1, 2, 3, 5)
- Dave Ogilvie – guitar and tapes (1, 5), engineering, mixing
- Lee Salford – percussion (2, 5)
- Lisa – vocals (4)
- Nivek Ogre – vocals (5)

Technical personnel

- Steven R. Gilmore – artwork
- Greg Sykes – typography
