= Curse (The Legendary Pink Dots album) =

Studio album by The Legendary Pink Dots
- Released: 4 August 1983
- Length: 46:58
- Label: In Phaze (UK); Soleilmoon (US); Big Blue (Poland)

The Legendary Pink Dots chronology
Chemical Playschool 3 & 4 (1983)	Curse (1983)	The Tower (1983)

Professional ratings
Review scores
Source	Rating
Allmusic	2.5/5 stars

Curse is a 1983 album by The Legendary Pink Dots.

== Track listing ==
No.	Title	Length
1.	"Love Puppets"	6:56
2.	"Wall Purges Night"	4:16
3.	"Lisa's Party"	3:43
4.	"Arzhklahh Olgevezh!"	6:15
5.	"Prüümptje Kurss"	2:02
6.	"Waving at the Aeroplanes"	3:07
7.	"Hiding"	1:02
8.	"Dolls' House"	7:50
9.	"The Palace of Love"	5:16
10.	"Stoned Obituary"	6:31
Total length:		46:58

== Personnel ==
- D'Archangel (Edward Ka-Spel) – vocals, glockenspiel
- The Silver Man (Phil Knight) – synthesizers, malvezh, percussion
- Stret Majest (Barry Gray) – guitars, prazhada
- Prüümptje Jüste (Roland Calloway) – bass, suste glockenspiel
- Aradia (April Iliffe) – keyboards, occasional vocal, glockenspiel

== Additional personnel ==
- Keith Thompson – drums, vocal
- Sally Graves – flute, voice
- Pazhklah Zzäpp (Patrick White) – extra percussion

Engineered by Pat Bermingham

== Notes ==
- The initial release by In Phaze was limited to 2,500 copies. Both the Big Blue and Soleilmoon editions feature different artwork, while the former also includes a lyric booklet.
