= To Be an Angel Blind, the Crippled Soul Divide =

Studio album by The Tear Garden
- Released: 1996
- Genre: Psychedelic
- Length: 1:11:40
- Label: Nettwerk/Subconscious

The Tear Garden chronology
The Last Man to Fly (1992)	To Be an Angel Blind, the Crippled Soul Divide (1996)	Crystal Mass (2000)

Professional ratings
Review scores
Source	Rating
Allmusic	3/5 stars

To Be an Angel Blind, the Crippled Soul Divide is the third album by the Tear Garden, released four years after The Last Man to Fly.

This is the first Tear Garden album without Dwayne Goettel, with his death (and the end of Skinny Puppy) a year previously. The album tends to carry a less electronic and more somber tone to it overall as cEvin Key and others changed instrumental priorities following Goettel's death and their respective moods reflecting that death. Another member of the Legendary Pink Dots, Niels Van Hoornblower, appears on this album.

According to Edward Ka-Spel, the album was intended to be called To Be an Angel Blind, the Cripple Soul Divide, but all copies are erroneously titled as "Crippled". Ka-Spel corrected the title for the download release on Bandcamp, but the cover scan still shows the erroneous title.

== Track listing ==
1. Ascension Day – 6:01
2. We the People – 4:49
3. In Search of My Rose – 4:28
4. Crying from Outside – 7:03
5. Psycho 9 – 5:22
6. With Wings – 5:38
7. Judgement Hour – 6:15
8. New Eden – 4:24
9. Tasteless – 4:51
10. Cyberspider – 3:53
11. Malice Through the Looking Glass – 7:52
12. Phoenix – 5:30
13. The Habit – 5:34

== Notes ==
Personnel:

- cEvin Key
- Edward Ka-Spel
- The Silverman
- Ryan Moore
- Martijn De Kleer
- Niels Van Hoornblower

Guests:

- Peggy Lee
- Aeron Wild
- Mark Spybey
- Tom Anselmi

Produced by cEvin Key and Anthony Valcic.

Engineered by Anthony Valcic at Subconscious.

Mixed by Ken Marshall and Anthony Valcic, assisted by Frankie Verschuuren and Chris Peterson.
