= Crushed Velvet Apocalypse =

The Crushed Velvet Apocalypse

Studio album by the Legendary Pink Dots
- Released: 1990
- Genres: Alternative pop; neo-psychedelia; gothic rock
- Length: 68:06 (CD); 46:41 (LP and cassette)
- Labels: Play It Again Sam/Wax Trax!, Caroline (Belgium, US); Cacciocavallo/Soleilmoon (US); SPV (Poland)
- Producer: The Legendary Pink Dots

The Legendary Pink Dots chronology
Four Days (1990)	The Crushed Velvet Apocalypse (1990)	The Maria Dimension (1991)

The Crushed Velvet Apocalypse is an album by the Anglo-Dutch band the Legendary Pink Dots, released in 1990. The album is a cult fan favorite. Niels van Hoorn contributed on flute, saxophones, and clarinet.

== Critical reception ==
Professional ratings
Review scores
Source	Rating
AllMusic	4/5 stars
Chicago Tribune	3.5/4 stars

The Chicago Tribune wrote: "Using instrumentation that includes electronics, guitar, sitar, flute and oboe, the longtime-cult-favorite Pink Dots craft a sometimes-stark, sometimes-elegant, sometimes-dreamy outing of neo-psychedelia and alternative pop that's imbued with a pronounced eccentricity of vision and a captivating originality of execution." Trouser Press noted that "Green Gang" "runs sitar/tabla meanderings into twittering flutes and winds up building a quietly disturbing skein of motorway noise."

In 2016, LA Weekly included Crushed Velvet Apocalypse on its list of classic goth albums. Salt Lake City Weekly called the music "lush, luxurious and sensual, yet also dark and sinister, with a sense of mysticism that is foreboding more than comforting."

== Track listing ==
No.	Title	Length
1.	"I Love You in Your Tragic Beauty"	4:40
2.	"Green Gang"	7:38
3.	"Hellsville"	5:42
4.	"Hellowe'en"	1:17
5.	"The Safe Way"	4:31
6.	"Just a Lifetime"	7:40
7.	"The Death of Jack the Ripper"	5:20
8.	"New Tomorrow"	9:53
9.	"Princess Coldheart" (*)	6:40
10.	"The Pleasure Palace" (*)	8:10
11.	"The Collector" (*)	5:20
12.	"C.V.A." (+)	1:15
Total length:		1:08:06

(*) Not included on LP and cassette editions – taken from the Princess Coldheart 12".

(+) Unreleased CD bonus track.

== Personnel ==
- Qa'Sepel (Edward Ka-Spel) – voices, keyboards
- The Silver Man (Phil Knight) – keyboards, samples, devices, percussion
- Bob Pistoor – guitars, sitar, bass
- Niels van Hoorn – flute, saxophones, bass clarinet
- Hanz Myer – electronics, oboe, tymphanis

Additional personnel

- Hanz Myre – engineer

== Notes ==
- The SPV edition contains different artwork than that of the other editions.
- The album title references the Velvet Revolution of Czechoslovakia in 1989.
- The Safe Way references a grocery store on the west coast of the United States.
