= Michelle Gould =

Michelle Gould may refer to:

- Michelle Gould (racquetball) (born 1970), American racquetball player
- Michelle Gould, member of the Canadian folk-pop duo Lava Hay
