= The Golden Age (The Legendary Pink Dots album) =

Studio album by The Legendary Pink Dots
- Released: 1988
- Length: 59:05
- Label: Play It Again Sam/Wax Trax! (Belgium/US); Cacciocavallo/Soleilmoon (US); SPV (Poland)
- Producer: Hanz Myre & the Legendary Pink Dots

The Legendary Pink Dots chronology
Any Day Now (1987)	The Golden Age (1988)	Four Days (1990)

Professional ratings
Review scores
Source	Rating
Allmusic	4/5 stars

The Golden Age is a 1988 album by The Legendary Pink Dots.

== Background ==
Following a long tour for the previous album, Any Day Now, three of the six members of Legendary Pink Dots departed. Displaced from their Amsterdam squat, the remaining members lived and recorded in a barn and caravan under strained conditions, shaping the album’s somber tone. The Golden Age reflects this turbulent period, marked by instability, departures, and financial hardship. It also introduced guitarist Bob Pistoor in a temporary role and became Patrick Q. Wright’s final full album with the band, after which the group briefly shrank to a duo before adding Niels Van Hoorn. The band describe the album as "a striking collection of avant-garde, experimentally driven melancholy".

== Track listing ==
No.	Title	Length
1.	"Maniac"	4:07
2.	"The Talent Contest"	4:02
3.	"The More It Changes"	3:30
4.	"Hotel Noir"	6:45
5.	"Stille Nacht"	3:36
6.	"The Month After"	4:56
7.	"Lisa's Separation"	5:42
8.	"The Golden Age?"	2:00
9.	"Black Castles"	5:24
10.	"And Even the Vegetables Screamed"	1:35
11.	"Regression"	1:51
12.	"Blacklist" (*)	6:44
13.	"Methods" (*)	4:13
14.	"Our Lady in Cervetori" (*)	4:40
Total length:		59:05

(*) Not included on original LP editions – taken from the Blacklist 12".

== Personnel ==
Adapted from the album's liner notes.

- Edward Ka-Spel – vocals, keyboards
- The Silverman (Phil Knight) – keyboards, samples, loops
- Patrick Q Wright – violins, viola, keyboards, drum programming, percussion
- Hanz Myre – saxophones, flute, electronix

== Additional personnel ==
- Bob Pistoor – guitar
- Hanz Myre – engineer

== Notes ==
- The SPV edition contains different artwork than that of the other editions.
