= Stained glass (disambiguation) =

Stained glass refers to both coloured glass as a material and to works made from it.

Stained glass may refer also to:

== Glass ==
- British and Irish stained glass (1811–1918), manufacture took place in early 19th-century Britain
- Came glasswork, the process of joining cut pieces of art glass through the use of came strips or foil into picturesque designs in a framework of soldered metal
- Medieval stained glass, the coloured and painted glass of medieval Europe from the 10th century to the 16th century
- Munich-style stained glass, produced in the Royal Bavarian Stained Glass Manufactory, Munich, in the mid-19th century

== Art and entertainment ==
- Stained Glass (puzzle), a binary determination logic puzzle published by Nikoli
- Stained Glass (TV series), a 2004 South Korean television series
- "Stained Glass" (Cloak & Dagger), an episode of Cloak & Dagger
- Stained Glass (novel), a 1978 Blackford Oakes novel by William F. Buckley, Jr.

=== Music ===
- Stained Glass (band), an American rock group from San Jose, California
- Stained Class, a 1978 Judas Priest album
- Stained Glass, a piece by contemporary composer David Gillingham
- Stained Glass, Soma Fountains, a 1997 album by the Legendary Pink Dots

== See also ==
- Glass
- Cathedral glass
- Stained-glass ceiling
