= Asylum (The Legendary Pink Dots album) =

Studio album by The Legendary Pink Dots
- Released: 1985
- Length: 75:04
- Label: Play It Again Sam (Belgium); Cacciocavallo/Soleilmoon (US); SPV (Poland)

The Legendary Pink Dots chronology
The Tower (1984)	Asylum (1985)	Prayer For Aradia (1985)

Professional ratings
Review scores
Source	Rating
Allmusic	4/5 stars

Asylum is a 1985 album by The Legendary Pink Dots.

== Track listing ==
No.	Title	Length
1.	"Echo Police"	4:48
2.	"Gorgon Zola's Baby"	2:29
3.	"Fifteen Flies In the Marmalade"	2:47
4.	"Femme Mirage"	3:35
5.	"The Hill"	4:22
6.	"Demonism"	2:35
7.	"Prisoner"	5:11
8.	"So Gallantly Screaming"	11:13
9.	"I Am the Way, The Truth, The Light"	8:01
10.	"Agape"	3:49
11.	"Golden Dawn"	5:49
12.	"The Last Straw"	4:53
13.	"A Message From Our Sponsor"	4:06
14.	"Go Ask Alice"	3:25
15.	"This Could Be the End"	8:01
Total length:		1:15:04

== Personnel ==
- The Prophet Qa'Spel – voice, keyboards
- The Silverman (Phil Knight) – keyboards
- Stret Majest (Barry Gray) – guitar
- Patrick Q Paganini (Patrick Wright) – violin, keyboards, vocals
- Poison Barbarella (Julia Niblock Waller of Attrition) – bass, keyboards, vocals
- Adantacathar (Graham Whitehead) – keyboards

== Additional personnel ==
- Steven Stapleton – tape editing

== Notes ==
- The SPV edition contains different artwork than that of the other editions.
