= Bouquet of Black Orchids =

1993 compilation album by the Tear Garden

Compilation album by The Tear Garden
- Released: 1994
- Genre: Psychedelic
- Length: 74:52
- Label: Nettwerk Europe

The Tear Garden chronology
Bouquet of Black Orchids (1994)	For Those Who Would Walk with the Gods (2001)

Bouquet of Black Orchids is a 1994 compilation of tracks by the Tear Garden created by Nettwerk Europe for the European market. It contains songs from the band's first two LPs (Tired Eyes Slowly Burning, The Last Man to Fly) and first two EPs (The Tear Garden, Sheila Liked the Rodeo).

== Track listing ==
1. Sheila Liked the Rodeo – 4:45
2. Ophelia – 8:36
3. Tear Garden – 4:51
4. My Thorny Thorny Crown – 3:57
5. Romulus and Venus – 6:09
6. White Coats & Haloes – 2:21
7. Blobbo – 4:18
8. Sybil the Spider Consumes Himself – 4:26
9. A Ship Named 'Despair' – 3:41
10. The Centre Bullet – 9:46
11. You and Me and Rainbows – 16:46
12. OO Ee OO – 5:16

== Notes ==
- Tracks 1, 7, and 8 originally on the EP Sheila Liked the Rodeo
- Tracks 2, 3, 4 and 10 originally on the EP The Tear Garden
- Tracks 5, 6, and 9 originally on the LP The Last Man to Fly
- Tracks 11 and 12 originally on the LP Tired Eyes Slowly Burning
