= The Whispering Wall =

Studio album by The Legendary Pink Dots
- Released: 2004
- Recorded: Studio Lent and Studio Klaverland, January - March 2004
- Label: Reach Out
- Producers: Raymond Steeg, The Legendary Pink Dots

The Legendary Pink Dots chronology
All the King's Men (2002)	The Whispering Wall (2004)	Poppy Variations (2004)

Professional ratings
Review scores
Source	Rating
Allmusic	4/5 stars

The Whispering Wall is a 2004 album by The Legendary Pink Dots.

== Track listing ==
1. Soft Toy
2. A Distant Summer
3. Dominic
4. In Sickness and in Health
5. For Sale
6. King of a Small World
7. The Region Beyond
8. 06
9. Peek-A-Boo
10. The Divide
11. Sunken Pleasure/Rising Pleasure/No Walls, No Strings

== Credits ==
- The Silverman (Phil Knight): keyboards, electronics
- Edward Ka-Spel: voice, keyboards
- Erik Drost: guitar
- Niels Van Hoornblower: saxophone, clarinet
- Raymond Steeg: sound wizardry

Engineered by Raymond Steeg and The Legendary Pink Dots Cover by Poppy K. with thanks to Gladys Easystreet and Ramona Stork.
