= Island of Jewels =

Island Of Jewels

Studio album by The Legendary Pink Dots
- Released: 1986
- Length: 44:11
- Label: Play It Again Sam (Belgium); Penguin (Greece); Cacciocavallo/Soleilmoon (US); SPV (Poland)
- Producer: Hanz Myre & the Legendary Pink Dots

The Legendary Pink Dots chronology
Prayer For Aradia (1985)	Island Of Jewels (1986)	Any Day Now (1988)

Professional ratings
Review scores
Source	Rating
Allmusic	3.5/5 stars

Island Of Jewels is a 1986 album by The Legendary Pink Dots.

== Track listing ==
No.	Title	Length
1.	"Tower Six"	2:20
2.	"The Red & the Black"	3:35
3.	"The Dairy"	3:42
4.	"Emblem Parade"	3:07
5.	"Jewel On An Island"	4:31
6.	"Rattlesnake Arena"	3:44
7.	"The Shock Of Contact"	5:00
8.	"Jewel In the Crown"	4:56
9.	"Our Lady In Chambers"	3:39
10.	"Our Lady In Kharki"	2:19
11.	"Our Lady In Darkness"	4:48
12.	"The Guardians Of Eden"	1:37
Total length:		44:11

== Personnel ==
- Edward Ka'Spel – voice, occ. keyboards, electronix
- The Silver Man (Phil Knight) – silverscapes, samplescopes, keyboards
- Stret Majest (Barry Gray) – guitars
- Patrick Q (Patrick Wright) – violins, keyboards, rhythm programmes, mandoline
- (Graham Whitehead) – keyboards, piano, backing vocals
- Hanz Myre – saxophone

== Additional personnel ==
- Hanz Myre – engineer

== Notes ==
- The first 5,000 copies of the PIAS and Penguin LP editions come housed in a gatefold sleeve with printed lyrics.
- All editions contain different cover artwork.
