= Suzanne Little =

Canadian singer-songwriter

- Occupations: Musician, songwriter
- Instruments: Singing, guitar
- Label: Nettwerk
- Formerly of: Lava Hay
- Spouse: Tom Hooper

Suzanne Marie Little is a Canadian singer-songwriter. She was a member of Lava Hay in the early 1990s, and subsequently released three albums as a solo artist.

After Lava Hay's breakup in 1993, Little relocated to Salt Spring Island, British Columbia. In late 1994, she went to San Francisco to work with record producer Norm Kerner, and collaborated with such musicians as Chuck Prophet of Green on Red, David Immerglück of Camper Van Beethoven and Bruce Kaphan of American Music Club. The result was her 1995 debut album, Be Here Now. Her first solo tour was in January 1996.

She is married to fellow singer-songwriter Tom Hooper.

== Discography ==
- 1995: Be Here Now (Nettwerk)
