= The Gethsemane Option =

Studio album by The Legendary Pink Dots
- Released: 25 June 2013
- Genre: Electronic
- Label: Metropolis Records

The Legendary Pink Dots chronology
The Creature That Tasted Sound (2012)	The Gethsemane Option (2013)	Code Noir (album) (2013)

Professional ratings
Review scores
Source	Rating
The Quietus	Positive
Brainwashed	Mostly positive

The Gethsemane Option is a 2013 album by The Legendary Pink Dots. It is the first album by The Legendary Pink Dots to be released on Metropolis Records.

The CD back cover only features the band name, album title, and track listing.

== Track listing ==
No.	Title	Length
1.	"A Star is Born"	5:39
2.	"The Garden of Ealing"	8:04
3.	"Esher Everywhere"	7:35
4.	"Pendulum"	11:09
5.	"Grey Scale"	6:07
6.	"A Stretch in Time"	7:54
7.	"One More Dimension"	9:40
