= The Tower (The Legendary Pink Dots album) =

Studio album by The Legendary Pink Dots
- Released: 1984
- Length: 42:44
- Labels: In Phaze (UK); Terminal Kaleidoscope/Play It Again Sam (Belgium); Soleilmoon (US)
- Producer: Pat Bermingham

The Legendary Pink Dots chronology
Curse (1983)	The Tower (1984)	Asylum (1985)

Professional ratings
Review scores
Source	Rating
Allmusic	3/5 stars

The Tower is a 1984 album by The Legendary Pink Dots. It was the last album which April White (credited as April Iliffe/Sybil Strange-Cargo) appeared on.

== Track listing ==
No.	Title	Length
1.	"Black Zone"	3:05
2.	"Break Day"	3:35
3.	"Tower One"	5:05
4.	"Vigil-Anti"	4:24
5.	"A Lust For Powder"	3:16
6.	"Poppy Day"	3:56
7.	"Tower Two"	3:57
8.	"Astrid"	3:42
9.	"Rope & Glory"	0:51
10.	"Tower Three"	4:06
11.	"Tower Four"	4:44
12.	"Tower Five"	1:07
Total length:		42:44

== Personnel ==
- Che Banana (Edward Ka-Spel) – vocals, keyboards, electronics
- Phil Harmonix (Phil Knight) – keyboards, electronics, percussion
- Stret Majest Alarme (Barry Gray) – guitars
- Sybil Strange-Cargo (April Iliffe) – keyboards, vocals
- Patrick Paganini Q (Patrick Wright) – violin, keyboards
- Roland Calloway – bass

== Additional personnel ==
- Lilly AK (Astrid) – vocals (on track 8)
- Armin Bliss
- Pat Bermingham – engineer

== Notes ==
- The initial release by In Phaze was limited to 2,500 copies. The Terminal Kaleidoscope/PIAS editions contain a different cover, while the Soleilmoon editions feature new artwork.
