= Plutonium Blonde =

Studio album by The Legendary Pink Dots
- Released: 7 October 2008
- Recorded: Studio Lent and Studio Klaverland, 2007-2008
- Genre: Electronic rock
- Length: 55:20
- Label: Reach Out International Records
- Producer: Raymond Steeg, The Legendary Pink Dots

The Legendary Pink Dots chronology
Your Children Placate You from Premature Graves (2006)	Plutonium Blonde (2008)	Seconds Late for the Brighton Line (2010)

Professional ratings
Review scores
Source	Rating
Allmusic	4/5 stars

Plutonium Blonde is a 2008 album by The Legendary Pink Dots.

== Track listing ==
All tracks are written by The Legendary Pink Dots

No.	Title	Length
1.	"Torchsong"	7:08
2.	"Rainbows Too?"	9:32
3.	"A World With No Mirrors"	5:18
4.	"My First Zonee"	3:59
5.	"Faded Photograph"	4:29
6.	"An Arm And A Leg"	6:42
7.	"Mailman"	2:23
8.	"Oceans Blue"	7:48
9.	"Savannah Red"	1:49
10.	"Cubic Caesar"	6:32
Total length:		55:20

== Personnel ==
- Edward Ka-Spel - vocals, keyboards, devices
- The Silverman - synthesizers, keyboards, devices
- Martijn De Kleer - acoustic and electric guitars, fuzz bass, banjo and exotic percussion
- Niels van Hoorn - saxophones, flute, bass flute and bass clarinet
- Raymond Steeg - mixing and engineering
