= From Here You'll Watch the World Go By =

Studio album by the Legendary Pink Dots
- Released: 1995
- Length: 54:55
- Label: Soleilmoon
- Producer: Pink Dots

The Legendary Pink Dots chronology
Nine Lives to Wonder (1994)	From Here You'll Watch the World Go By (1995)	Hallway of the Gods (1997)

From Here You'll Watch the World Go By is an album by the Legendary Pink Dots, released in 1995.

== Critical reception ==
Professional ratings
Review scores
Source	Rating
AllMusic	4/5 stars

AllMusic wrote: "Generally speaking, the focus on the album is on group performances with odd interjections as opposed to full-on cut-up efforts, with Ka-Spel's now sui generis lyrical approach and delivery leading the weird and wild way as always."

== Track listing ==
No.	Title	Length
1.	"Clockwise"	4:37
2.	"Citadel"	6:30
3.	"Friend"	2:41
4.	"A Velvet Resurrection"	5:55
5.	"Kollusim"	3:14
6.	"1001 Commandments"	4:59
7.	"Remember Me This Way"	3:21
8.	"This One-Eyed Man Is King"	5:20
9.	"Straight On 'Til Morning"	8:44
10.	"Damien"	6:19
11.	"This Hollowed Ground"	3:07
Total length:		54:55

== Personnel ==
- The Silverman - keyboards, soundtools
- Ryan Moore - acoustic bass, electric bass, drums and percussion
- Niels Van Hoornblower - saxophones, flute, bass clarinet
- Martijn De Kleer - electric guitar, acoustic guitar, drums
- Edward Ka-Spel - voice, keyboards
- Raymond Steeg - sound tools
