= Your Children Placate You from Premature Graves =

Your Children Placate You From Premature Graves

Studio album by The Legendary Pink Dots
- Released: 2006
- Genre: Electronic
- Length: 1:02:49
- Label: Reach Out International Records
- Producer: Raymond Steeg, Legendary Pink Dots

The Legendary Pink Dots chronology
Alchemical Playschool (2006)	Your Children Placate You From Premature Graves (2006)	Plutonium Blonde (2008)

Professional ratings
Review scores
Source	Rating
Allmusic	4.5/5 stars

Your Children Placate You From Premature Graves is a 2006 album by The Legendary Pink Dots. It is the group's 25th anniversary album.

== Track listing ==
No.	Title	Length
1.	"Count Me In"	1:45
2.	"No Matter What You Do"	6:55
3.	"Stigmata (Part 4)"	6:54
4.	"Feathers At Dawn"	5:12
5.	"Please Don't Get Me Wrong"	6:36
6.	"Peace Of Mind"	5:27
7.	"The Island Of Our Dreams"	5:14
8.	"Bad Hair"	7:52
9.	"The Made Man's Manifesto"	7:46
10.	"A Silver Thread"	6:44
11.	"Your Number Is Up"	2:24
Total length:		1:02:49

== Personnel ==
- Edward Ka-Spel – voice, keyboards
- The Silverman – keyboards, electronics
- Martijn De Kleer – guitar, bass, drums
- Niels van Hoorn – saxophone, flute
- Raymond Steeg – production, mixing, mastering, engineer
