= A Perfect Mystery =

Studio album by the Legendary Pink Dots
- Released: 2000
- Genre: Goth cabaret; folk rock; electronic
- Label: Caciocavallo/Soleilmoon
- Producer: The Legendary Pink Dots

The Legendary Pink Dots chronology
Nemesis Online (1998)	A Perfect Mystery (2000)	All the King's Horses (2002)

A Perfect Mystery is an album by the Legendary Pink Dots, released in 2000.

== Production ==
The band tried a different method to recording on A Perfect Mystery, working on the songs together in the studio instead of constructing them from ideas already developed by individual members.

== Critical reception ==
Professional ratings
Review scores
Source	Rating
AllMusic	3.5/5 stars
The Encyclopedia of Popular Music	3/5 stars

The Washington Post wrote that the album "finds the Dots in good form, combining contemporary electronics with '70s jazz-rock touches in the service of goth-cabaret-folk-rock songs." The Plain Dealer wrote that "the dense, highly textured sounds reveal the band members' interests in the more adventurous aspects of techno and industrial music, but the music feels purposeful, not indulgent." The Times-Picayune thought that A Perfect Mystery alternates "pulsing, up-tempo rockers with moodier pieces interlaced with spooky keyboards and an effects-laden saxophone."

== Track listing ==
1. Lent
2. When I'm with You
3. When Lenny Meets Lorca
4. Skeltzer Spleltzer
5. Mood 159
6. Pain Bubbles
7. Blue
8. Condition Green
9. Death of a King
10. Godless
11. Premonition 25 (vinyl issue bonus track)

== Credits ==
- Qa'Sepel – voice, keyboards
- The Silverman (Phil Knight) – keyboards, filters, sound processing, voices from beyond
- Ryan Moore – bass, drums, percussion, sound processing
- Martijn de Kleer – guitars, violin, drums and bass
- Niels van Hoornblower – saxophones, flute, bass clarinet, percussion
- Frank Verschuuren – sound processing
