= All the King's Men (The Legendary Pink Dots album) =

Studio album by The Legendary Pink Dots
- Released: 2002
- Genre: Psychedelia
- Label: Reach Out International Records
- Producer: The Legendary Pink Dots

The Legendary Pink Dots chronology
All the King's Horses (2002)	All the King's Men (2002)	The Whispering Wall (2004)

Professional ratings
Review scores
Source	Rating
AllMusic	4/5 stars

All the King's Men is a 2002 album by The Legendary Pink Dots.

== Track listing ==
1. Cross Of Fire
2. The Warden
3. Touched By The Midnight Sun
4. Rash
5. The Day Before It Happened
6. Brighter Now
7. Marz Attacks
8. Sabres At Dawn
9. All The King's Men
10. The Brightest Star

== Credits ==
- Edward Ka-Spel - voice, keyboards
- The Silverman (Phil Knight) - keyboards, electronics
- Martijn de Kleer - guitars, violin
- Niels van Hoorn - horns
- Raymond Steeg - sound wizardry
