= The Maria Dimension =

Studio album by The Legendary Pink Dots
- Released: May 1991
- Length: 73:34
- Label: Play It Again Sam
- Producer: The Legendary Pink Dots

The Legendary Pink Dots chronology
Crushed Velvet Apocalypse (1990)	The Maria Dimension (1991)	Shadow Weaver (1992)

Professional ratings
Review scores
Source	Rating
Allmusic	4.5/5 stars

The Maria Dimension is a 1991 album by The Legendary Pink Dots.

== Overview ==
The original edition was released by PIAS (Play It Again Sam) in Belgium and Europe. The first 3,000 copies of the European CD edition included a bonus CD3" containing additional tracks. These were later re-released on the 1995 compilation Chemical Playschool 8+9.

Other editions include Caroline and Cacciocavallo/Soleilmoon in the U.S., and SPV in Poland (with different artwork by Zdzisław Beksiński).

== Track listing ==
Cassette and CD versions (the vinyl LP had only tracks 1 to 8):

No.	Title	Length
1.	"Disturbance"	5:24
2.	"Pennies for Heaven"	4:18
3.	"Third Secret"	4:27
4.	"The Grain Kings"	8:02
5.	"The Ocean Cried 'Blue Murder'"	4:10
6.	"Belladonna"	4:06
7.	"A Space Between"	6:30
8.	"Evolution"	8:51
9.	"Cheraderama"	4:57
10.	"Lilith"	4:02
11.	"Fourth Secret"	2:58
12.	"Expresso Noir"	3:38
13.	"Home"	5:32
14.	"Crushed Velvet"	6:39
Total length:		73:34

A bonus 3" CD came with the first 3000 copies of the album. These songs have since been re-released on Chemical Playschool 8+9.

No.	Title	Length
1.	"I Dream of Jeannie"	3:55
2.	"Little Oyster"	3:59
3.	"She Gave Me an Apple"	3:09
4.	"Stirred But Not Shaken"	2:14
5.	"Where No Man"	6:36
Total length:		19:53

== Personnel ==
Musical

The Legendary Pink Dots:

- Edward Ka-Spel (as "The Prophet Qa'Sepel") - vocals, performer
- Phil Knight (as "The Silver Man") - performer
- Bob Pistoor (as "Father Pastorius") - performer
- Niels van Hoorn (as "Niels van Hoornblower") - performer

With:

- Hans Meyer - electronic devices
- Jason (Salmon) - additional vocals (on "Pennies for Heaven")
- Marie

Playing:

- Instruments - keyboards, samples, electric guitar, acoustic guitar, sitar, Hawaiian guitar, lyre, percussion, tea cups, tenor saxophone, baritone saxophone, flute, bass clarinet, glockenspiel, bass guitar, drums, voices "(sometimes from beyond)"

Technical

- Edward Ka-Spel - master tape

Graphical

- Stephan Barbery - artwork
