= Crystal Mass =

Studio album by The Tear Garden
- Released: 2000
- Genre: Psychedelic
- Length: 57:45
- Label: Nettwerk/Subconscious

The Tear Garden chronology
To Be an Angel Blind, the Crippled Soul Divide (1992)	Crystal Mass (2000)	The Brown Acid Caveat (2017)

Professional ratings
Review scores
Source	Rating
Allmusic	2.5/5 stars

Crystal Mass is the fourth album by the Tear Garden, released four years after To Be an Angel Blind, the Crippled Soul Divide. It has the same line-up as the previous release.

This was their last album released on Nettwerk.

== Track listing ==
All tracks by The Tear Garden

1. "Lament" – 6:28
2. "The Double Spades Effect" – 5:13
3. "Desert Island Disc" – 5:23
4. "Hopeful" – 3:28
5. "Her Majesty's Trusted Food Taster" – 6:54
6. "Castaway" – 5:17
7. "Feathered Friends" – 4:56
8. "To Mourn the Death of Colour" – 12:39
9. "Six of One" – 7:26

== Personnel ==
- Martijn de Kleer – acoustic guitar, violin, electric guitar
- Rachel K. – artwork
- Edward Ka-Spel – keyboards, vocals, producer, electronics
- cEvin Key – acoustic guitar, percussion, drums, keyboards, producer, electronics, tapes
- Remco Polman – image manipulation
- Niels Van Hoorn – flute
- Bill Van Rooy – hand percussion
- Frankie Verschuuren – producer, engineer

Crystal Mass has a tracking error: tracks 4 and 5 ("Hopeful" and "Her Majesty's Trusted Food Taster") are indexed as a single 10:23 track. In addition, the track listing on the album mistakenly titles track 6 as "Her Majesty's Trusted Food Taster" when in fact it is "Castaway".

"To Mourn the Death of Colour" is used as a lyric in the Legendary Pink Dots song "Cheraderama".
