= Basilisk (The Legendary Pink Dots album) =

1982 studio album by the Legendary Pink Dots

Studio album by The Legendary Pink Dots
- Released: 1982
- Recorded: 1981–1982
- Genre: Experimental
- Label: Third Mind (UK); Terminal Kaleidoscope, Mirrordot (Netherlands); Beta-lactam Ring (US)

The Legendary Pink Dots chronology
Apparition (1981)	Basilisk (1982)	Chemical Playschool 3 & 4 (1983)

Professional ratings
Review scores
Source	Rating
Allmusic	2.5/5 stars

Basilisk is a 1982 album by The Legendary Pink Dots.

== Track listing ==
1. "Stigmata Part One (Freiheit)" 4:43
2. "Klazh" 1:40
3. "Love Is..." 6:58
4. "No Reason" 3:51
5. "834" 1:11
6. "Wall Purges Night (Version)" 4:15
7. "Basilisk 1" 3:42
8. "Methods" 2:19
9. "Clean Up" 3:42
10. "Basilisk 2" 26:32
11. "The Ocean Cried 'Blue Murder' on A Ferry In a Storm On a Walkman" *
12. "Ideal Home / The Glory, The Glory" *

(*) Tracks included on the 2002 BLRR re-release.

== Personnel ==
- Edward Ka-Spel – vocals, keyboards
- Rolls Anotherone (Roland Calloway?) – bass
- Barry Gray – guitars
- Phil Harmonix (Phil Knight) – keyboards
- Keith Thompson – drums, percussion
- April Iliffe – vocals
- Keith Thompson – lead vocals on "Ideal Home"
- Patrick Paganini (Patrick Wright) – violin, keyboards
- Sally Graves – extra effects

== Notes ==
- The initial release by Third Mind was limited to 1,000 copies. Every release has a different cover.
- The version of "The Glory, The Glory" on the CD is a different version than on the 80's cassette releases.
- The album was re-released in 2002 on Beta-lactam Ring Records, with remastered sound courtesy of sound engineer and long-time LPD contributor Raymond Steeg.
