= All the King's Horses (The Legendary Pink Dots album) =

Studio album by The Legendary Pink Dots
- Released: 2002
- Label: Caciocavallo
- Producer: The Legendary Pink Dots

The Legendary Pink Dots chronology
A Perfect Mystery (2000)	All the King's Horses (2002)	All the King's Men (2002)

Professional ratings
Review scores
Source	Rating
Allmusic	2.5/5 stars

All The King's Horses is an album by The Legendary Pink Dots. It was released in 2002. It derives its title from a line in the Humpty Dumpty nursery rhyme.

== Track listing ==
1. The Unlikely Event
2. The Way I Feel Today
3. 12th
4. Our Dominion
5. Chain Surfing
6. Just Wave
7. It's the Real Thing
8. A Bargain at Twice the Price
9. Daisy
10. Birdie
11. Lisa Goes Surfing
12. Wax and Feathers

== Credits ==
- Edward Ka-Spel - voice, keyboards
- The Silverman (Phil Knight) - keyboards, electronics
- Martijn de Kleer - guitars, violin
- Niels van Hoorn - horns
- Raymond Steeg - sound wizardry
