= The Last Man to Fly =

Studio album by The Tear Garden
- Released: 1992
- Genre: Psychedelic
- Length: 1:13:17
- Label: Nettwerk

The Tear Garden chronology
Tired Eyes Slowly Burning (1987)	The Last Man to Fly (1992)	To Be an Angel Blind, the Crippled Soul Divide (1996)

Singles from The Last Man to Fly
- 1. "Romulus and Venus" Released: 1992

Professional ratings
Review scores
Source	Rating
AllMusic	4.5/5 stars
Calgary Herald	B+

The Last Man to Fly is the Tear Garden's second full release, released five years after the first. A single titled "Romulus and Venus" was released and well received by critics.

The Last Man to Fly was the first release that integrated a live band. The songs were mostly improvised and edited while playing live in the studio during August of 1991. cEvin Key's bandmate D. Rudolph Goettel from Skinny Puppy became a permanent member of The Tear Garden. Also joining the band were The Silverman, Ryan Moore, and Martijn de Kleer from Edward Ka-Spel's own the Legendary Pink Dots, expanding the band from simply being an Edward and cEvin duo (with guests), as the previous releases were. Accompanying this release was their second EP, Sheila Liked the Rodeo, which was mostly recorded playing live in a single night.

The album was the product of several recording sessions. Ka-Spel describes the recording process and album as an amazing oasis in a troublesome sea. At the very start of the recording process at Mushroom Studios in Vancouver they went out for Indian food. After the meal, some of the band members ended up at a performance by Daevid Allen in a small gallery with 30 or 40 people in attendance. The event felt very organic and magical. The crowd held hands and chanted "om" and there was a "hippy" vibe. This experience served as an inspirational way to start the creative process. Can, Brainticket, the White Noise, and Faust were also mutual inspirations among the band. cEvin has described Ka-Spel's suggestion to watch Live at the Hollywood Bowl with stereo speakers as an inspiration for this era.

The material was mostly written during the recording process, with the exception of "Circles in the Sand" and "Romulus and Venus," which were mostly precomposed by Key before the sessions, and "A Ship Named 'Despair'" which was mostly precomposed by Goettel. Samples for "Romulus and Venus" were recorded from late night radio recorded by Key in Jamaica, including local DJ Gary G. The band each switched instruments for the song "Isis Veiled." De Green Guy is featured prominently throughout the album.

== Track listing ==
1. "Hyperform" – 5:12
2. "The Running Man" – 8:22
3. "Turn Me On, Dead Man" – 6:37
4. "Romulus and Venus" – 6:08
5. "The Great Lie" – 4:49
6. "Empathy with the Devil" – 7:52
7. "Circles in the Sand" – 3:27
8. "Love Notes & Carnations" – 5:19
9. "A Ship Named 'Despair'" – 3:41
10. "White Coats and Haloes" – 2:19
11. "Isis Veiled" – 3:22
12. "Last Post" – 8:58
13. "3-D Technicolour Scrambled Egg / Trip Down the Hell-Hole (with Canary)" – 7:09

== Notes ==
Personnel:

- cEvin Key
- Edward Ka-Spel
- Dwayne Rudolph Goettel
- The Silverman
- Ryan Moore
- Martijn De Kleer
- Dave "Rave" Ogilvie
- De Green Guy

Engineered by Ken Marshall at Mushroom in August 1991.

Edited by Anthony Valcic.
