= Any Day Now (The Legendary Pink Dots album) =

Studio album by The Legendary Pink Dots
- Released: 1988
- Length: 54:44
- Label: Play It Again Sam/Wax Trax! (Belgium/US); Penguin (Greece); Cacciocavallo/Soleilmoon (US); SPV (Poland)

The Legendary Pink Dots chronology
Island Of Jewels (1986)	Any Day Now (1988)	The Golden Age (1989)

Professional ratings
Review scores
Source	Rating
AllMusic	4/5 stars

Any Day Now is a 1988 album by The Legendary Pink Dots.

== Track listing ==
No.	Title	Length
1.	"Casting the Runes"	5:47
2.	"A Strychnine Kiss"	3:19
3.	"Laguna Beach"	2:21
4.	"The Gallery"	3:30
5.	"Neon Mariners"	4:46
6.	"True Love"	3:21
7.	"The Peculiar Fun Fair"	0:32
8.	"Waiting For the Cloud"	10:18
9.	"Cloud Zero"	5:48
10.	"Under Glass" (*)	7:06
11.	"The Light In My Little Girl's Eyes" (*)	5:01
12.	"The Plasma Twins" (*)	2:55
Total length:		54:44

(*) Included only on CD versions – taken from the Under Glass 12".

== Personnel ==
- The Prophet Qa'Sepel (Edward Ka-Spel)
- The Silver Man (Phil Knight)
- Stret Majest Alarme (Barry Gray)
- Patrick Q (Wright)
- Graham Whitehead
- Jason (Salmon)

== Additional personnel ==
- Lady Sunshine (Marylou Busch) – vocals (on track 1)
- Tony Copier – drums (on tracks 2 and 8)
- Hanz Myre – baritone saxophone (on track 2), sound processing

== Notes ==
- The SPV edition contains different artwork than that of the other editions.
