= Waschhaus =

Coordinates: 52.403°N 13.073°E

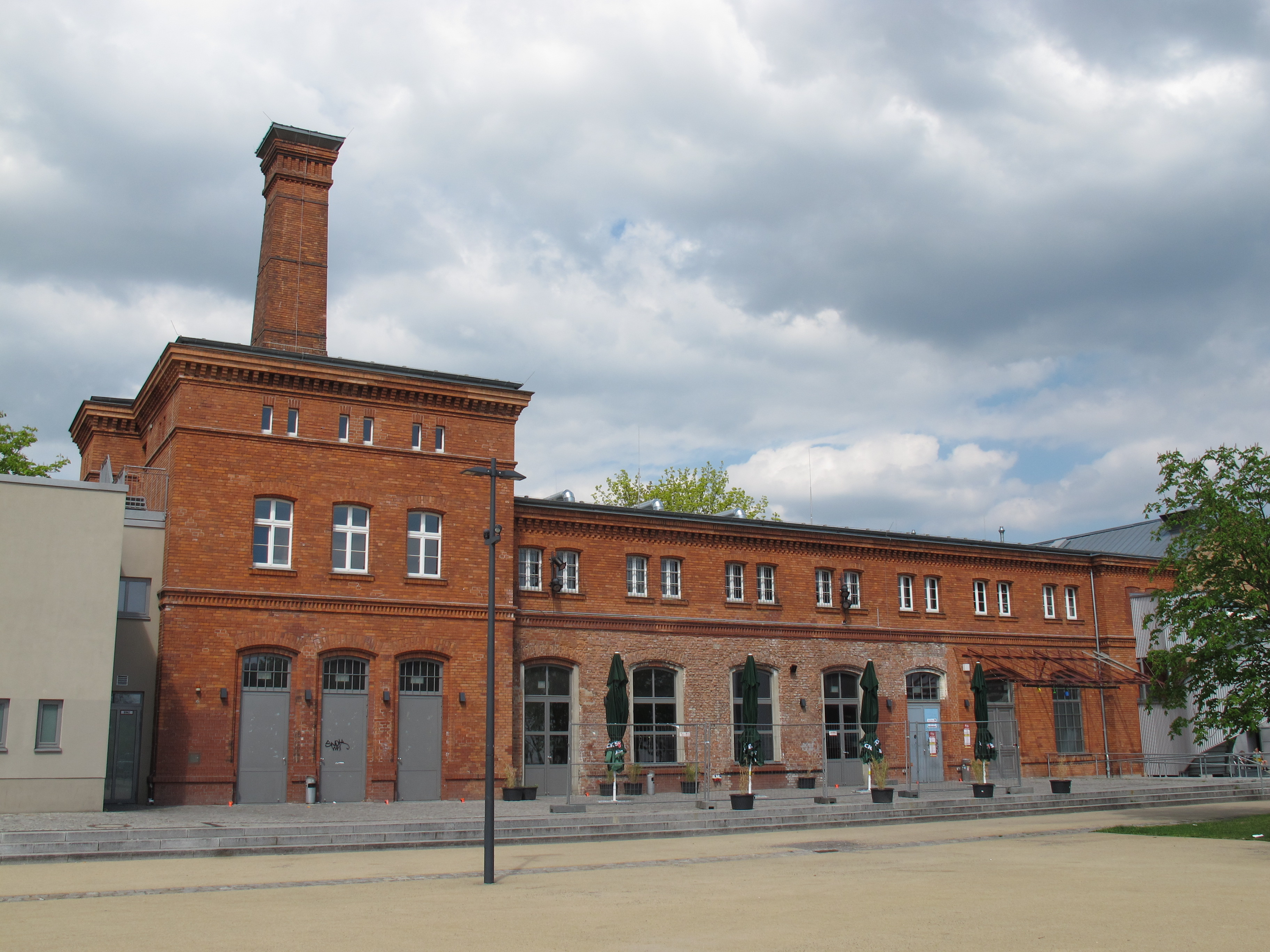
The Waschhaus

The Waschhaus (English: wash house) is the largest nightclub of the Brandenburg state capital Potsdam in Germany.

Founded in the summer of 1992 in the laundry rooms of the former garrison in the Schiffbauergasse, forty young people interested in art and culture started to present parties, events and exhibitions. Soon afterwards the Waschhaus e.V. club was founded. Now the Waschhaus Potsdam, it has established itself as a centre of art and culture with the main focus on music, film, dance and fine arts, has become a major attraction for the Potsdam cultural scene.

Thousands of visitors attend the Schiffbauergasse every week to listen to concerts, see exhibitions, enjoy themselves at parties, watch movies or participate in dance workshops.

Popular bands to have played here include Bloodhound Gang, Freundeskreis, Blumfeld, 17 Hippies and Wir sind Helden.

Other highlights are the monthly exhibitions of nationally and internationally successful artists and the very popular open air cinema in the summer.

In 2002, over 150,000 people visited the Waschhaus.
