= Malachai (album) =

Malachai (Shadow Weaver Part 2)

Studio album by The Legendary Pink Dots
- Released: 1993
- Genre: Psychedelia; dub; acoustic
- Length: 70:27
- Label: Play It Again Sam Records
- Producer: Steven Stapleton and The Legendary Pink Dots

The Legendary Pink Dots chronology
Shadow Weaver (1992)	Malachai (Shadow Weaver Part 2) (1993)	Nine Lives to Wonder (1994)

Professional ratings
Review scores
Source	Rating
AllMusic	3/5 stars

Malachai (Shadow Weaver Part 2) is an album by The Legendary Pink Dots released in 1993 on Play It Again Sam Records.

== Track listing ==
No.	Title	Length
1.	"Joey the Canary"	6:29
2.	"Kingdom of the Flies"	4:13
3.	"Encore Une Fois"	5:02
4.	"Wildlife Estate"	5:02
5.	"Pavane"	5:03
6.	"Window on the World"	11:54
7.	"On the Boards"	6:49
8.	"We Bring the Day"	19:01
9.	"Paris 4AM"	6:55

== Personnel ==
- The Prophet Qa'Sepel (a.k.a. Edward Ka-Spel) – vox inhumana, keyboards
- Ryan Moore – bass guitar, acoustic guitar
- Niels van Hoornblower – saxophones, clarinet, bass clarinet, flute
- The Silverman – keyboards, exotic devices
- Patrick Q-Wright – violin, viola
- Steven Stapleton – more exotic devices

=== Production ===
- Produced by Steven Stapleton and The Legendary Pink Dots.
- Engineered by Vincent Hoedt, X-Ray Alley and The Legendary Pink Dots.
