= Vibronics =

UK musical group

- Origin: Leicester, England
- Genres: Reggae, dub, sound systems
- Years active: 1995–present
- Labels: SCOOPS, Universal Egg
- Members: Steve Vibronics; Richi Rootz; Madu; Vitamin M Stevie Splits; Boney 'L'; Murryman; Wayne McArthur; Jah Marnyah; Echo Ranks; M.Parvez (a collective assistant)
- Website: www.vibronics.co.uk

Vibronics are a reggae collective, based in Leicester, England, starting in 1995. Centered on Steve Vibronics and Richi Rootz, they initially gained exposure via the Egg Experience '97 shows, leading to a deal with Zion Train's Universal Egg label. Mainly working in digital dub, Vibronics' early releases such as "Universal Love" and "Jah Light, Jah Love" found favour with sound systems such as Jah Shaka's, Iration Steppas, and Aba Shanti-I. With Jah Free, Vibronics performed on a series of dub conferences in several European countries, leading to the release of the album Outernational Dub Conference Volume One in 1998.

They set up their own SCOOPS label, and in recent years have worked with vocalists such as Prince Alla, Tena Stelin, Ranking Joe, Madu Messenger, Parvez (Dub Factory), Jah Marnyah, and Echo Ranks, as well as a collaboration with Fun Lovin' Criminals.

Vibronics have toured all over Europe, including an "Acoustic Vibronics" set at Summer Sundae in 2007, and have received airplay on national radio shows such as Brinsley Forde's BBC 6 Music Dub Bashment programme.

== Discography ==
- Outernational Dub Conference Volume One (1998) Universal Egg (with Jah Free)
- Dub Italizer (2000) Universal Egg
- Dubliftment (2004) Universal Egg
- Heavyweight Scoops Selection (2005) Soundsaround
- Heavyweight Scoops Selection Chapter II
- UK Dub Story (2008)
- Best Of Deep Root, Vol. 1 (2011) [Universal Egg]
- The French Connection (2012)
- The Return Of Vibronics (2015)
