= The Tear Garden =

Canadian band

- Edward Ka-Spel, vocalist

Background information
- Origin: Vancouver, British Columbia, Canada
- Genres: Psychedelic; experimental; electronic
- Years active: 1986–present
- Website: Official The Tear Garden webpage

The Tear Garden is a psychedelic/experimental/electronic band formed by Edward Ka-Spel of the Legendary Pink Dots and cEvin Key of Skinny Puppy in 1985 after Key served as a sound engineer on tour in Canada for Ka-Spel. An EP, The Tear Garden, was released that same year. The pair have since released a number of records with the assistance of various guest musicians. Their most recent album, Astral Elevator, was released by Artoffact Records on October 24, 2025.

== History ==
The Tear Garden released the album Tired Eyes Slowly Burning in 1987. It featured contributions from Skinny Puppy members Dwayne Goettel, Nivek Ogre, and Dave Ogilvie. The record featured a nearly 17 minute long track titled "You and Me and Rainbows", described by AllMusic's Sean Carruthers as "monolithic... but worth every second". A reissue of the album included the group's first EP, The Tear Garden, with the rest of the album. Members of the Legendary Pink Dots would henceforth contribute to Tear Garden and in 1992 they released the full-length album The Last Man to Fly. Another EP, Sheila Liked the Rodeo, much of which was recorded during the same sessions as The Last Man to Fly, was released in 1993. Only a few tracks feature Ka-Spel's vocals.

With the collapse of Skinny Puppy in 1995 and cEvin's primary commitment over, he and the Tear Garden released To Be an Angel Blind, the Crippled Soul Divide in 1996, followed by Crystal Mass in 2000. Crystal Mass marked a departure for the group, with more focus seemingly directed toward sound and production than the traditional staple, the lyrics. In 2002 a limited edition compilation of previously unreleased songs, Eye Spy with My Little Eye came out on Key's Subconscious Communications label. A best of, For Those Who Would Walk with the Gods is also available.

The Tear Garden have never toured, which has limited their commercial potential. The only live performance of Tear Garden material by members of both Skinny Puppy and the Legendary Pink Dots was on April 14, 1988, in Leiden, Holland and May 1, 1988, at Foyer St. Arbogast in Strasbourg France, during Skinny Puppy's Head Trauma tour, for which Edward Ka-Spel was the opening solo act. At the end of Ka-Spel's set cEvin Key joined him on guitar and keyboards for a performance of the song "The Centre Bullet". The Legendary Pink Dots have performed "Isis Veiled" as an almost necessary encore at every show during their last few tours.

In March 2008, after having successfully collaborated in 2007 on The Secret Experiment, cEvin Key made mention that Edward Ka-Spel was due to show up in Los Angeles sometime soon and that new material could possibly arise from any presumed meeting of the pair.

Early in 2017, it was announced that the group would celebrate their 30th anniversary with the release of a new album, The Brown Acid Caveat. The album would be accompanied with the release of the rarities collection album Eye Spy Vol.2.

On April 12th, 2026, the band announced plans to play their first official live show ever. A month later, on May 12th, the band's Instagram page announced a full North American tour, to take place from September 14th to October 5th.

== Members ==
- cEvin Key - keyboards, guitar, bass guitar, drums
- Edward Ka-Spel - vocals, keyboards

== Discography ==
=== Albums ===
Title	Year	Label
Tired Eyes Slowly Burning	1987	Nettwerk
The Last Man to Fly	1992	Nettwerk
To Be an Angel Blind, the Crippled Soul Divide	1996	Nettwerk/Subconscious
Crystal Mass	2000	Nettwerk/Subconscious
The Secret Experiment	2007	Subconscious
Have a Nice Trip	2009	Subconscious
The Brown Acid Caveat	2017	Subconscious / Metropolis
Astral Elevator	2025	Artoffact Records

=== EPs ===
Title	Year	Label
The Tear Garden	1986	Nettwerk
Sheila Liked the Rodeo	1993	Nettwerk

=== Collections ===
Title	Year	Label
Eye Spy with My Little Eye	2002	Subconscious
Eye Spy Vol. 2	2017	Subconscious / Metropolis

=== Compilations ===
Title	Year	Label
Bouquet of Black Orchids	1993	Nettwerk Europe
For Those Who Would Walk with the Gods	2001	Brudenia
