= Hallway of the Gods =

Studio album by the Legendary Pink Dots
- Released: 1997
- Genre: Psychedelia; electronic dance music; space rock
- Length: 62:50
- Label: Soleilmoon
- Producer: The Legendary Pink Dots

The Legendary Pink Dots chronology
| From Here You'll Watch the World Go By (1995) | Hallway of the Gods (1997) | Nemesis Online (1998) |

Hallway of the Gods is an album by the Legendary Pink Dots, released in 1997.

== Critical reception ==
Professional ratings
Review scores
| Source | Rating |
|---|---|
| AllMusic | 3/5 stars |

The Columbus Dispatch thought that "the acoustic, Bowie-esque 'Lucifer Landed', with its grandiose strings and woodwinds, is mesmerizing, and the psychedelic 'The Hanged Man' feels like a musical out-of-body experience." The Denver Post stated: "Something of a Pink Floyd for the '90s, the Dots offer gnarled psychedelic pop, weird tape effects and spooky lyrics."

AllMusic wrote that "this 1997 entry from the band's continuing exploration in dark psychedelia is, like so many of the Legendary Pink Dots' efforts, a winner in both quiet and overwhelming modes."

== Track listing ==
| No. | Title | Length |
|---|---|---|
| 1. | "On High" | 5:48 |
| 2. | "Mekkanikk" | 3:17 |
| 3. | "Sterre" | 4:08 |
| 4. | "Spike" | 3:28 |
| 5. | "All Sides" | 4:43 |
| 6. | "Harvest Babies" | 5:41 |
| 7. | "Lucifer Landed" | 4:01 |
| 8. | "The Hanged Man" | 2:42 |
| 9. | "The Saucers Are Coming" | 11:14 |
| 10. | "Destined to Repeat" | 5:07 |
| 11. | "Hallway" | 12:41 |
| 12. | "9 Shades (Live in Houston) Parts 1 & 2" (*) |
| Total length: | | 1:02:50 |

(*) Bonus track on the limited edition vinyl release.

== Credits ==
- Qa'Sepel – voice, keyboards, destroyed lyre
- Silverman (Phil Knight) – keyboards
- Niels van Hoornblower – horns, flute, electric horns
- Ryan Moore – acoustic & electric guitar, bass, drums, theremin
- Atwyn (Edwin von Trippenhof) – electric guitar, squelch bass
- Frank Verschuuren – sound devices
- Nienke – lady voice
- Calyxx – little voice
