= Nemesis Online =

Studio album by the Legendary Pink Dots
- Released: 1998
- Genre: Art rock
- Length: 58:22
- Label: Soleilmoon

The Legendary Pink Dots chronology
| Hallway of the Gods (1997) | Nemesis Online (1998) | A Perfect Mystery (2000) |

Nemesis Online is an album by the Legendary Pink Dots, released in 1998.

== Critical reception ==
Professional ratings
Review scores
| Source | Rating |
|---|---|
| AllMusic | 3/5 stars |
| Pitchfork Media | 9.1/10 |

The Washington Post wrote: "Using today's technology to evoke the spirit of 1972, the Legendary Pink Dots make a credible case for self-indulgent art-rock." Keyboard thought that "as talented as the band is at manipulating tonal moods through programming, sampling, and effects, they can just as easily evoke feelings of terror or tranquillity with only a piano or guitar and vocals." The Chicago Tribune called the album "a tad uneven," but wrote that "it still erupts with some typically pretty, woozy and eerie hallucinations."

== Track listing ==
1. "Dissonance" - 5:46
2. "Jasz" - 1:25
3. "As Long as It's Purple and Green" - 6:04
4. "Ghost" - 3:46
5. "Under Your Wheels" - 4:09
6. "A Sunset for a Swan" - 5:43
7. "Is It Something I Said?" - 5:11
8. "Zoo" - 5:35
9. "Fate's Faithful Punchline" - 5:43
10. "Cheating the Shadow" - 3:29
11. "Abracadabra" - 5:54
12. "Slaapliedje" - 5:32

There has been a limited edition vinyl release too, encompassing two bonus songs on the D side.

1. "10th Shade" - 12:16
2. "Schatten" - 5:10

== Credits ==
- The Prophet Qa'Sepel – keyboards, voice, loops, destroyed lyre
- The Silverman (Phil Knight) – keyboards, loops, devices
- Niels van Hoornblower – horns, flutes
- Ryan Moore – bass, drums, guitar
- Edwin von Trippenhof – guitar and guitar mutations
- Frank Verschuuren – sound devices
