= Lava Hay =

Canadian music duo

- Origin: Toronto, Ontario, Canada
- Genres: Folk rock Alternative rock
- Years active: 1989-1994
- Labels: Nettwerk
- Past members: Suzanne Little; Michele Gould

Lava Hay were a Canadian folk rock duo formed in 1989 in Toronto, Ontario, consisting of Suzanne Little and Michele Gould. Little and Gould first met in 1986, while working at Now. In 1989, they recorded an album with the intention of distributing it independently, but it soon came to the attention of Nettwerk.

The duo signed to Nettwerk and remixed the album, bringing in members of The Grapes of Wrath, Bob Wiseman and The Water Walk for guest appearances. That album was released as Lava Hay in 1990. The duo's collaborations with The Grapes of Wrath soon took on an added component: Gould began dating Vincent Jones and Little began dating Tom Hooper, and both couples later married. Because of their close professional and personal relationships with the Grapes, the band sometimes struggled against a perception in the music press that they were merely puppets of their husbands' band rather than real musicians.

Lava Hay's second and final album, With a Picture in Mind, was released in 1992. That album's single "Don't Tell Me" was the band's highest-charting single in the RPM singles, with a peak position of 64. However, the album was also noted for being less artistically cohesive than the debut; while Little's songs retained the folk flavour the band was known for, Gould's were rapidly evolving toward a rock style strongly influenced by one of her first musical heroes, Chrissie Hynde.

After Lava Hay broke up in 1994, Gould formed the band Taste of Joy and Little released material as a solo artist.

== Discography ==
- 1989 - Lava Hay (eponymous self-released debut album). Manufactured and distributed by Lava Hay.
  - 1. Waiting For An Answer
  - 2. Genevieve
  - 3. My Friend
  - 4. Dancer
  - 5. In My World
  - 6. Midnight Sun
  - 7. Holding On
  - 8. The Alley Song
- 1990 - Lava Hay (eponymous major label debut album). Released on 1990-05-08 by Polydor (843 192).
  - 1. Baby
  - 2. What Will You Do
  - 3. Fall With You
  - 4. Holding On
  - 5. Alley Song
  - 6. Won't Matter
  - 7. Waiting For An Answer
  - 8. My Friend
  - 9. Midnight Sun
  - 10. Weeping Willow
  - 11. Wild Eyes
- 1990 - Baby (Single Release)
  - 1. Baby
  - 2. My Friend
  - 3. Midnight Sun
- 1990 - Wild Eyes (Single release)
  - 1. Wild Eyes
  - 2. Holding On
  - 3. Genevieve
- 1990 - Don't Tell Me (Single release)
  - 1. Don't Tell Me
  - 2. Walk on By
  - 3. Don't Tell Me (Version 2)
- 1992 - With a Picture in Mind. Second album release.
  - 1. Here And Nowhere
  - 2. Don't Tell Me
  - 3. Listen Well
  - 4. This Pain
  - 5. If I Leave Now
  - 6. Hey Girl
  - 7. Find My Way
  - 8. Once Again
  - 9. 3 O'Clock
  - 10. I'm Not Sure
  - 11. Lost You
- 1992 - Listen Well (Single release)
  - 1. Listen Well (Edit)
  - 2. Ring Of Fire
  - 3. If I Leave Now

=== Singles ===
- 1990 - Baby / My Friend
- 1990 - Wild Eyes
- 1990 - Won't Matter
- 1992 - Don't Tell Me
- 1992 - Listen Well
