= Shadow Weaver (The Legendary Pink Dots album) =

Studio album by the Legendary Pink Dots
- Released: 1992
- Length: 1:00:20 CD, 50:26 LP
- Labels: Play It Again Sam/Caroline (Belgium/US); Cacciocavallo/Soleilmoon (US); SPV (Poland)

The Legendary Pink Dots chronology
The Maria Dimension (1991)	Shadow Weaver (1992)	Malachai (Shadow Weaver Part 2) (1992)

Professional ratings
Review scores
Source	Rating
AllMusic	2/5 stars

Shadow Weaver is an album by the Legendary Pink Dots, released in 1992.

== Track listing ==
No.	Title	Length
1.	"Zero Zero"	7:39
2.	"Guilty Man"	6:07
3.	"Ghosts of Unborn Children"	6:55
4.	"City of Needles"	5:16
5.	"Stitching Time"	6:22
6.	"Twilight Hour"	5:37
7.	"The Key to Heaven"	5:45
8.	"Laughing Guest"	6:45
9.	"Prague Spring" (*)	3:26
10.	"Leper Colony" (*)	6:28
Total length:		1:00:20

(*) Included only on the CD editions.

== Personnel ==
- Edward Ka-Spel
- Silverman (Phil Knight)
- Niels van Hoornblower
- Martijn van Kleer
- Ryan Moore

Additional personnel

- Patrick Q-Wright
- Vincent Hoedt – engineer
- X-Ray Alley – engineer

== Notes ==
- The SPV edition contains different artwork than that of the other editions.
