= Soleilmoon Recordings =

American record label

Soleilmoon Recordings is an American record label that began in 1987 as a cassette label, operating from the back of a record shop called The Ooze in Portland, Oregon.

Initial releases were by Smegma, Muslimgauze, Coil, and Nocturnal Emissions. In 1991 the shop was sold and Soleilmoon became a full-time label.

== Soleilmoon artists ==
- A Small Good Thing
- Bass Communion
- Boyd Rice
- Coil
- Continuum
- Controlled Bleeding
- The Cutmen
- Edward Ka-spel
- Daniel Menche
- Death in June
- Eyeless in Gaza
- Fear Falls Burning
- Hafler Trio
- The Legendary Pink Dots
- Loren Nerell
- Lustmord
- Merzbow
- Muslimgauze
- Nocturnal Emissions
- O Yuki Conjugate
- People Like Us
- Randy Greif
- Rapoon
- Reformed Faction
- Steve Roach
- Tone Dogs
- Vidna Obmana
- Z'EV
- Zoviet France

== See also ==
- List of record labels
