= The Legendary Pink Dots =

Anglo-Dutch rock band

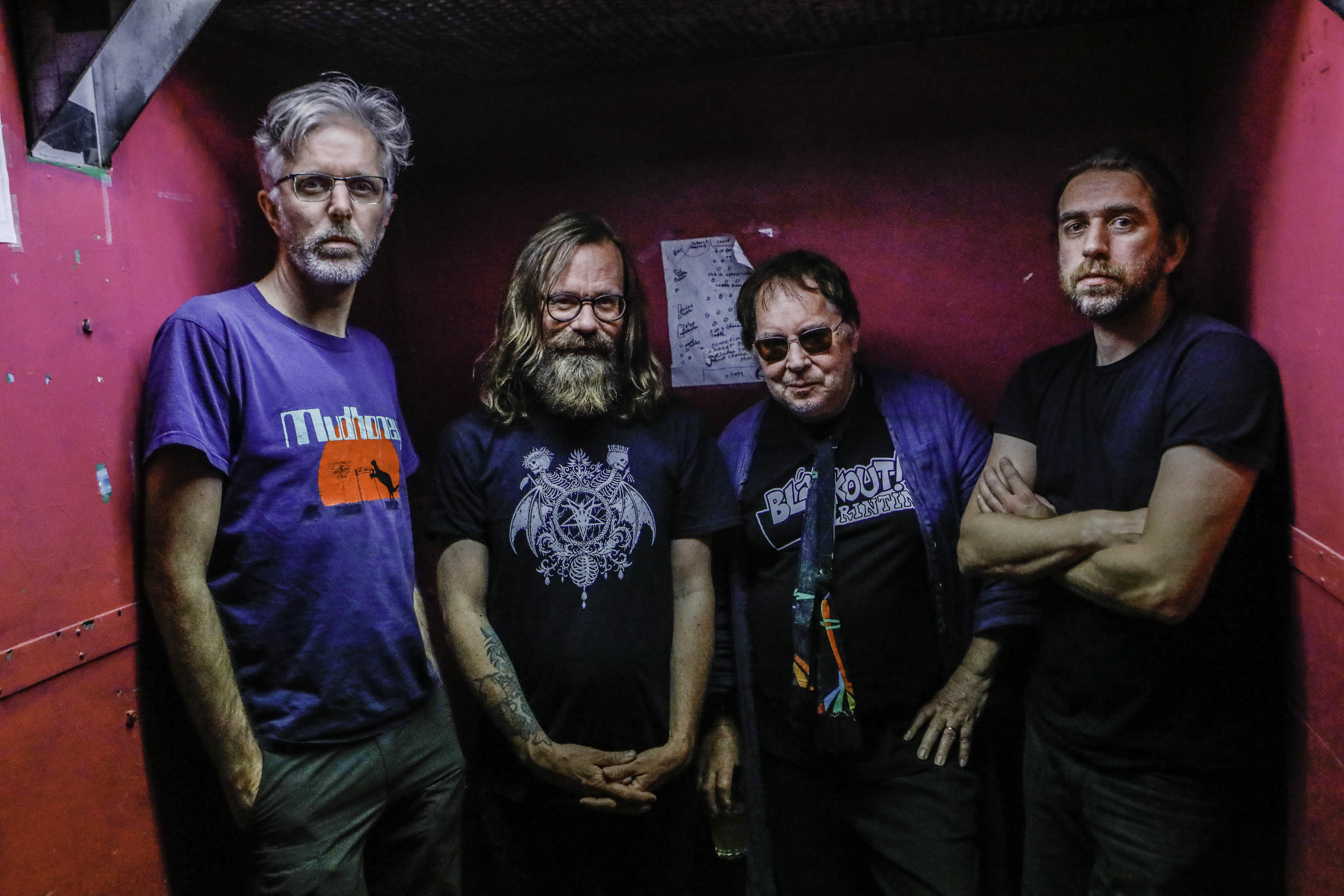
- The Legendary Pink Dots in 2022

Background information
- Genres: Experimental rock; psychedelic rock; post-punk; electronic
- Years active: 1980–present

The Legendary Pink Dots (a.k.a. LPD) are an Anglo-Dutch experimental rock band formed in London in August 1980. In 1984, the band moved to Amsterdam. Most of their career, LPD had two core members: singer/songwriter/keyboardist Edward Ka-Spel and keyboardist Phil Knight (a.k.a. Silverman). Other members and collaborators have varied over the years. In 2022, Knight retired from touring, and Randall Frazier (Orbit Service, A Star Too Far) joined the band on synths, samples and electronics. While no official announcement has been made, Phil Knight is not included in post-2022 recording liner notes.

As of 2022, the group is composed of Edward Ka-Spel (vocals, keyboards, songwriter), Randall Frazier (keyboards, electronics), Erik Drost (guitars) and Joep Hendrikx (live electronics/devices).

Their music has incorporated elements from neo-psychedelia, ambient music, electronic music, tape music, psychedelic folk, synthpop, post-punk, progressive jazz, noise music, pop music, goth rock and alternative rock. Although outside the mainstream (in terms of their avant-garde music and non-mainstream career path), LPD have released more than forty albums, have a devoted worldwide following, and tour frequently.

== Overview ==
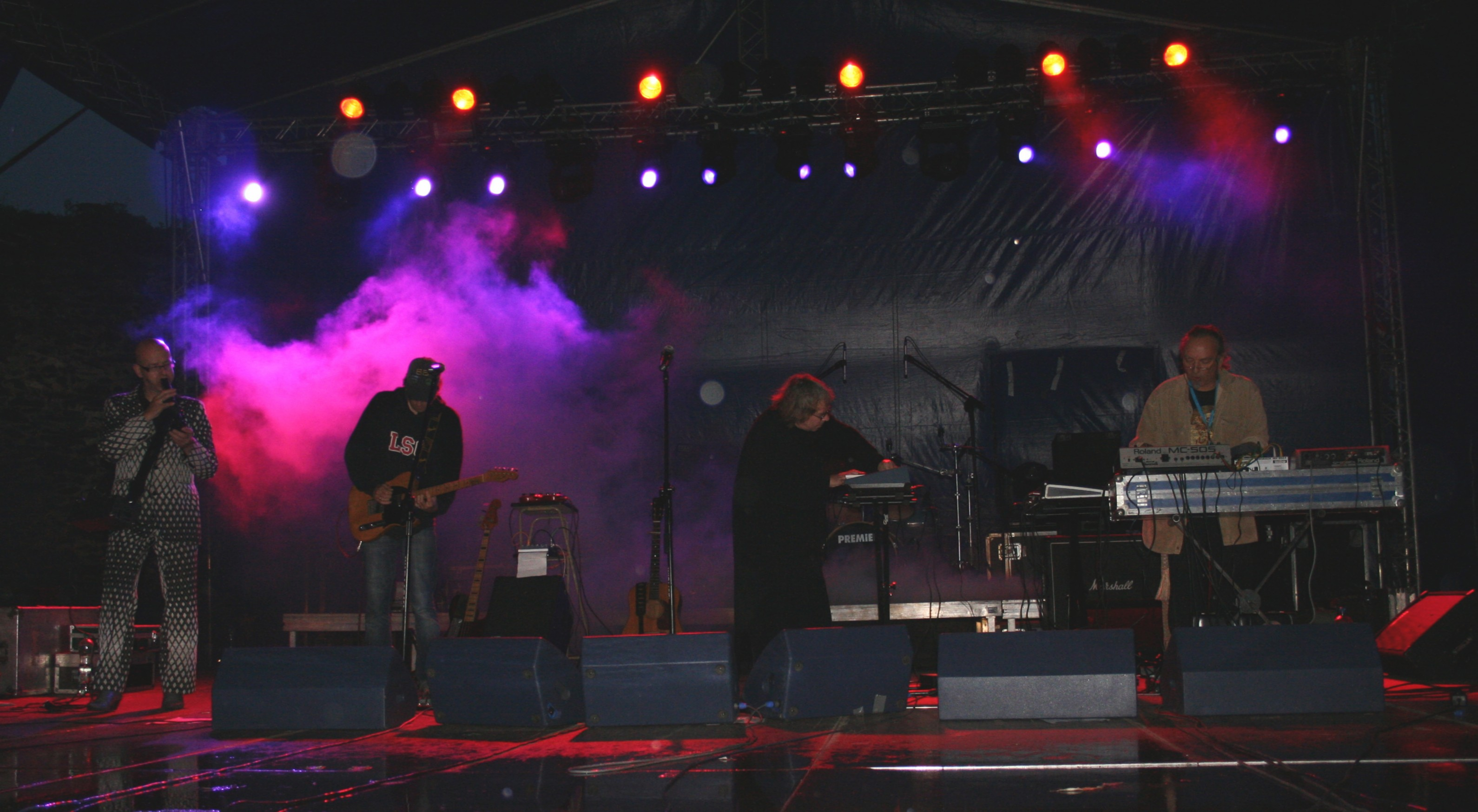
The Legendary Pink Dots performing in 2007

The band was originally called One Day... but subsequently changed the name to The Legendary Pink Dots. In the 1980s, the band released albums on Mirrordot and InPhaze; in 1985 they signed with Play It Again Sam for the release of The Lovers. The line-up became stable by 1988, with Niels van Hoornblower (horns) and Bob Pistoor (guitar) joining for the band's 1988 US tour. Pistoor died of cancer and his place was filled by Martijn de Kleer; drummer Ryan Moore completed the line-up live and in the studio. Their appeal has always been relatively small—a 1995 show in Mexico in front of 2,500 fans was described as "massive (by Dots' standards)". In 2004, Erik Drost replaced Martijn de Kleer on guitar, and the album The Whispering Wall was released.

Their music touches on elements of neo-psychedelia, ambient music, electronic music, tape music, psychedelic folk, synthpop, post-punk, progressive, jazz, noise, pop, and goth rock, with a distinctly experimental/avant-garde bent; their sound has evolved over time and remains distinctive, making it difficult to place the group into a concise style or genre. The group's overall sound combined with Ka-Spel's distinct lyrics and singing have earned comparisons to Pink Floyd and Syd Barrett; the group also has links to the sounds of krautrock bands such as Can, Faust, Brainticket and Neu! (whose "Super" they covered on the 1999 tribute album "A Homage to NEU!"), as well as the music of Magma.

== Related bands ==
The Pink Dots frequently collaborated with Skinny Puppy's cEvin Key, forming a side project named The Tear Garden. Key played drums on several tracks of the 1994 LPD album 9 Lives to Wonder.

Ryan Moore, who drummed on studio and live performances for the Legendary Pink Dots, left to work on his own musical outlet, the Twilight Circus Dub Sound System. He wrote and produced albums for Michael Rose of Black Uhuru, and has worked with other reggae figures such as Sly Dunbar.

The Pink Dots have influenced a wide range of bands, such as The Dresden Dolls, MGMT, Orbit Service, and Skinny Puppy.

== Discography ==
Studio Albums

- Only Dreaming (1981)
- Kleine Krieg (1981)
- Brighter Now (1982)
- Atomic Roses (1982)
- Premonition (1982)
- Apparition (1982)
- Basilisk (1982)
- Chemical Playschool 3 & 4 (1983)
- Curse (1983)
- The Tower (1984)
- Asylum (1985)
- Prayer For Aradia (1985)
- Island of Jewels (1986)
- Any Day Now (1988)
- The Golden Age (1989)
- Four Days (1990)
- Crushed Velvet Apocalypse (1990)
- The Maria Dimension (1991)
- Shadow Weaver (1992)
- Malachai (Shadow Weaver Part 2) (1992)
- 9 Lives to Wonder (1994)
- From Here You'll Watch the World Go By (1995)
- Hallway of the Gods (1997)
- Nemesis Online (1998)
- A Perfect Mystery (2000)
- All the King's Horses (2002)
- All the King's Men (2002)
- Poppy Variations (2004)
- The Whispering Wall (2004)
- Your Children Placate You from Premature Graves (2006)
- Alchemical Playschool (2006)
- Plutonium Blonde (2008)
- Seconds Late for the Brighton Line (2010)
- The Creature That Tasted Sound (2012)
- Taos Hum (2013)
- The Gethsemane Option (2013)
- Code Noir (2013)
- The Curse of Marie Antoinette (2013)
- 10^{9} (2014)
- The Seismic Bleats Of Quantum Sheep (2015)
- Five Days (2015)
- 5 Days Instrumentals (2015)
- Pages Of Aquarius (2016)
- 8118 (2018)
- Angel in the Detail (2019)
- The Museum Of Human Happiness (2022)
- The 13th Step (2022)
- So Lonely In Heaven (2025)
- Traumstadt 2 (2025)
