= Edward Ka-Spel =

English singer-songwriter and musician

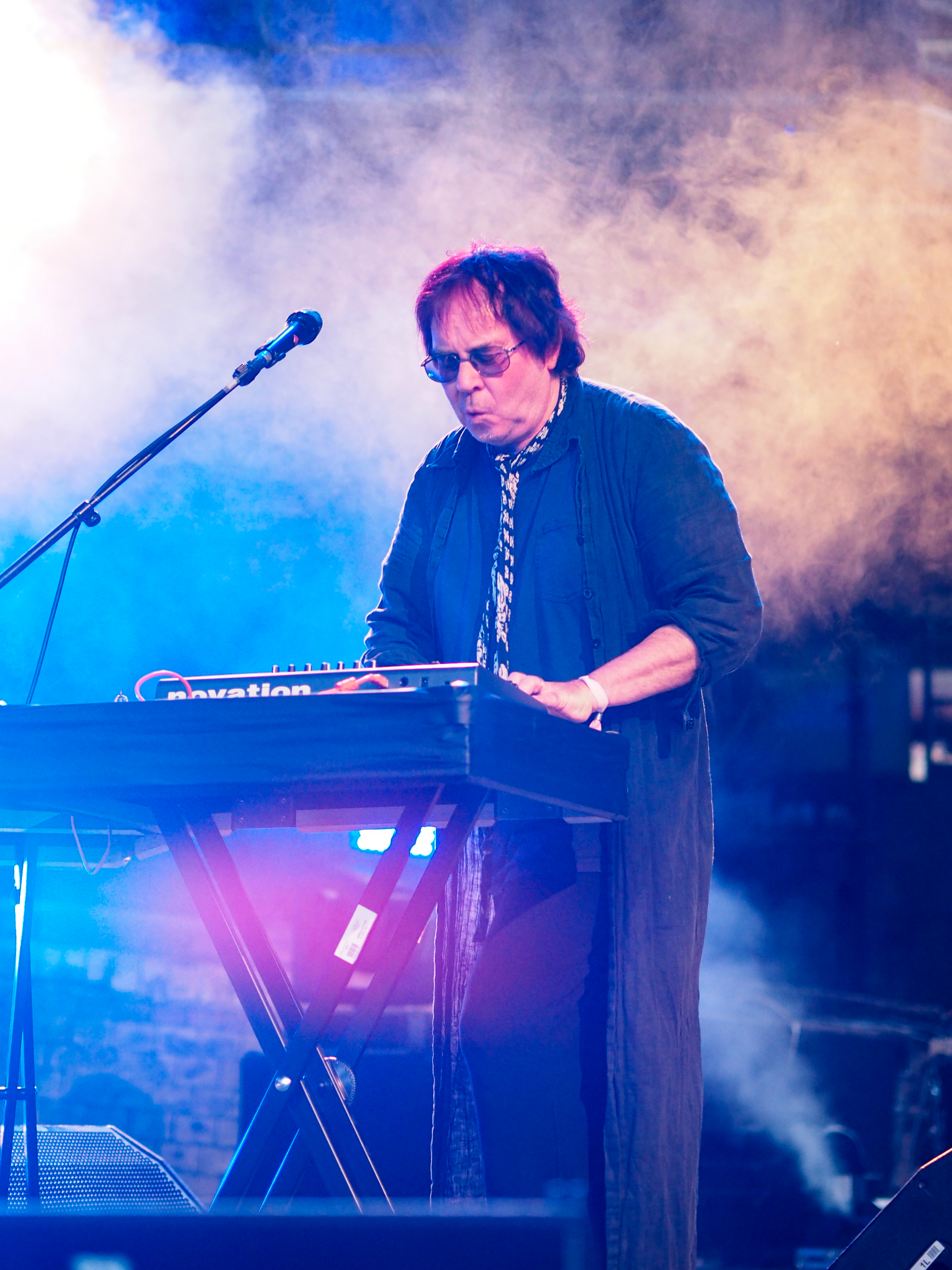
- Edward Ka-Spel on stage at the Traumzeit festival in 2017

Background information
- Born: 23 January 1954 (age 72); London, England
- Origin: Nijmegen, Netherlands
- Genres: Psychedelic; industrial; experimental; neofolk
- Occupation: Musician
- Instruments: Vocals; keyboards
- Years active: 1980–present
- Label: Third Mind
- Website: brainwashed.com/eks

Edward Ka-Spel (born Edward Sharp; 23 January 1954), (aka 'Archangel, Che Banana, The Prophet Qa'Spell, Qa-Sepel) is an English singer-songwriter and musician based in Amsterdam. He is best known for his work with the band The Legendary Pink Dots, which he co-founded. During performances, he often appears on stage barefoot, wearing a long scarf and either pink or black glasses. Early in his career, he drew black lines on his face and arms.

Ka-Spel is also known for his work on The Tear Garden with cEvin Key. In 2017, he collaborated with Amanda Palmer on the album I Can Spin a Rainbow.

Much of Ka-spel's recordings are issued in limited editions through Soleilmoon. He has also released numerous cassette-only special recordings, usually including materials out-of-print on earlier labels along with new releases.

== Biography ==
He was born in London, England. Ka-Spel is best known as the lead singer, keyboard and electronics player, songwriter and co-founder of the band The Legendary Pink Dots, in which he was initially known as D'Archangel, Prophet Q'Sepel and other pseudonyms. He has also released numerous solo albums (initially featuring other members of the Legendary Pink Dots, and including contributions from Steven Stapleton), and has worked in various side projects, including The Tear Garden (with cEvin Key of Skinny Puppy), and Mimir (with Phil Knight, Christoph Heemann, Jim O'Rourke and others). An album with 48 Cameras, Songs from the Marriage of Heaven & Hell was released in 2019.

Ka-Spel's solo albums range from abstract electronic noise to more traditional pop songs, incorporating diverse elements of psychedelia, industrial, avant garde, experimental electronic, art pop, classical music, folk (nursery songs), sampling, noise, collage, music concrete, etc. His lyrics have been described as mystically bizarre and ambiguous, and incorporate recurrent themes from his own personal mythos. Ka-Spel's songwriting has been compared to that of Syd Barrett and early Pink Floyd, though the artist describes the comparison as being a coincidence, not a direct influence. Ka-Spel has cited Iannis Xenakis, the Beatles, Nurse With Wound, David Bowie, Brainticket, Can, The Residents, Magma, and Throbbing Gristle as significant influences.

== Associated acts ==
- The Legendary Pink Dots
- The Tear Garden
- Mimir
- Nurse with Wound
- The Silverman
- Twilight Circus Dub Soundsystem
- Strange Attractor
- Niels Van Hoorn

== Discography (selected) ==
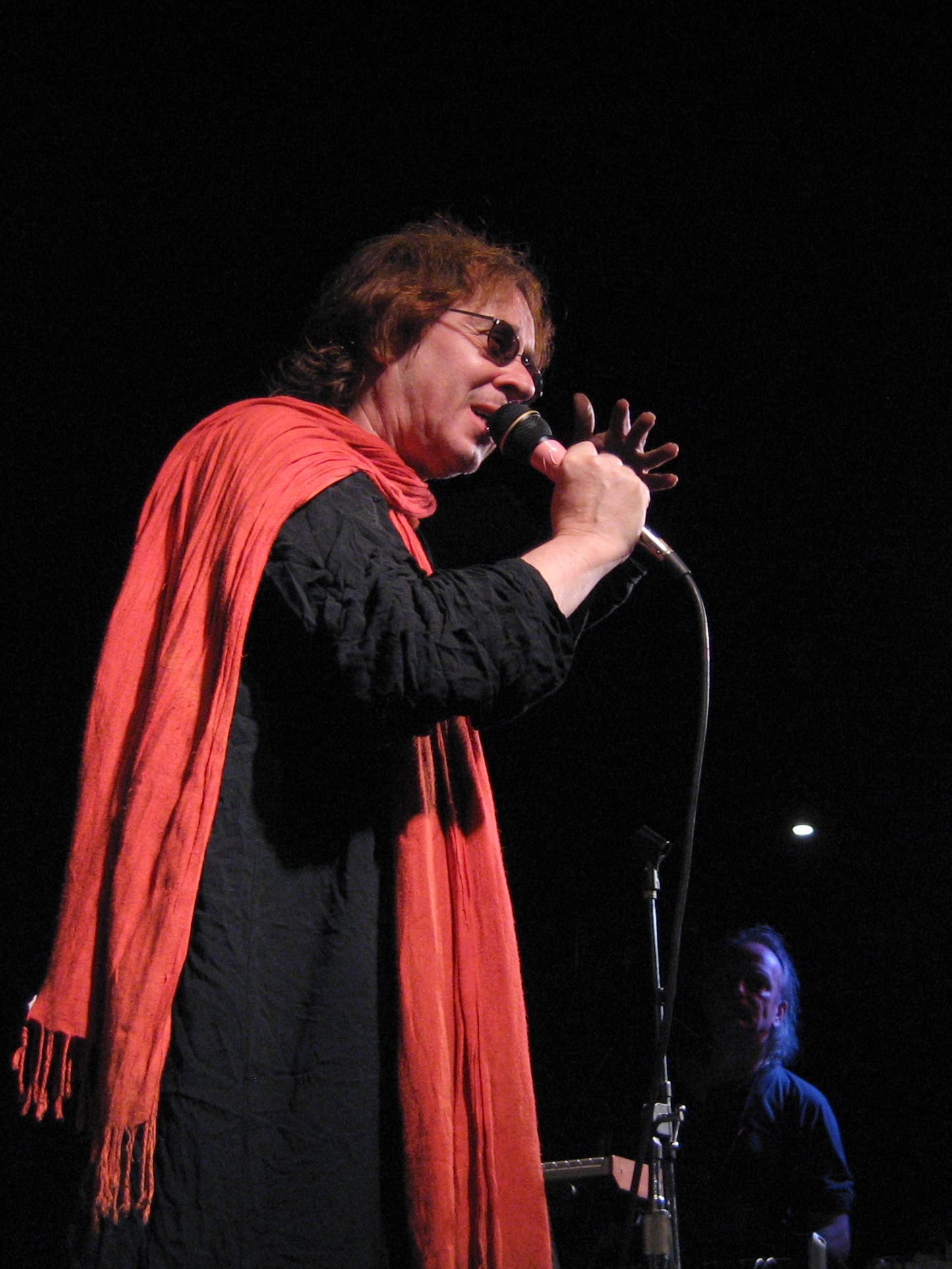
Ka-Spel live with The Legendary Pink Dots in 2006

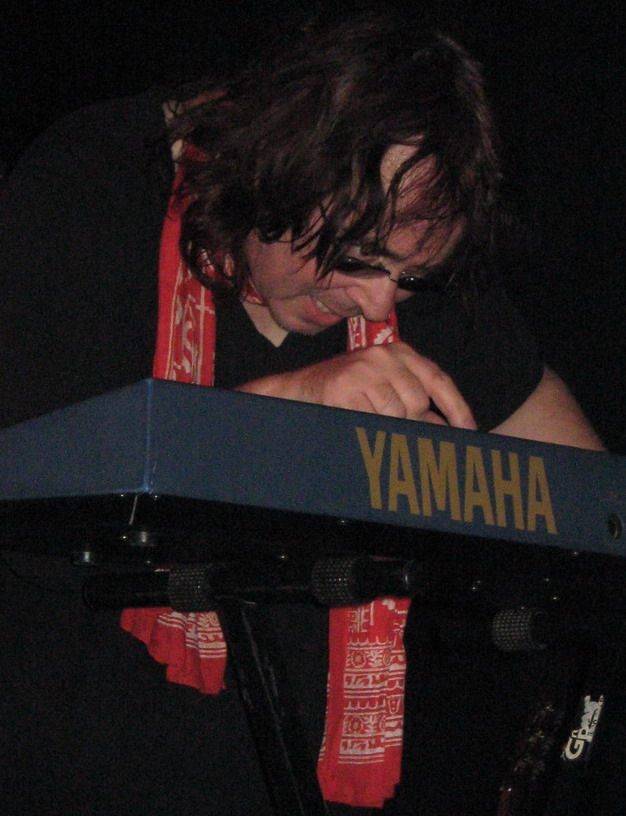
Ka-Spel live in 2008

=== Albums ===
- (1984) Laugh, China Doll
- (1985) Eyes!, China Doll
- (1986) Chyekk, China Doll
- (1987) AaΔzhyd, China Doll
- (1988) Khataclimici, China Doll
- (1991) Tanith & the Lion Tree
- (1995) The Scriptures of Illumina
- (1995) The Textures of Illumina
- (1995) DNA LE DRAW D-KEE (with Elke Skelter as DNA LE DRAW D-KEE)
- (1998) The Blue Room
- (2000) Red Letters
- (2001) Absence of Evidence
- (2001) Caste O' Graye Skreeens
- (2002) O'er a Shalabast'r Tyde Strolt Ay
- (2004) Pieces Of ∞
- (2005) O Darkness! O Darkness!
- (2005) A Long Red Ladder to the Moon
- (2005) Fragments of Illumina
- (2007) Dream Logik Pt 1
- (2008) Dream Logik Pt 2
- (2008) The Painted River of Regrets
- (2009) The Whispering Wail (with The Silverman)
- (2009) Dream Loops
- (2009) Transmit Acoustique Abstraction Two (with Armchair Migraine Journey)
- (2009) Trapped in Amber
- (2010) Devascapes
- (2010) Red Sky at Night (with Alena Boikova)
- (2010) The Thirty Year Itch (with The Silverman)
- (2010) The Minus Touch
- (2011) A Pleasure Cruise Through 9 Dimensions
- (2012) This Saturated Land
- (2012) Ghost Logik
- (2013) Fire Island
- (2013) One Last Pose Before the Ruin
- (2013) 800 Saints in a Day (with the Twilight Circus)
- (2014) Are You Receiving Us, Planet Earth?! (with French musician Philippe Petit)
- (2014) Ghost Logik 2
- (2015) The Victoria Dimension
- (2015) Spectrescapes Vol. 2
- (2015) CybersKapes
- (2016) Spectrescapes Volume 3
- (2017) I Can Spin A Rainbow (with Amanda Palmer)
- (2019) Midnight Pharmacy (with Nuits Rouges)
- (2019) The Moon Cracked Over Albion
- (2020) On the Rebound
- (2021) Prints of Darkness
- (2021) Songs of Solitude
- (2021) The Neon Weeps Tonight
- (2021) A Sentient Glitch
- (2021) Fainting By Numbers
- (2021) The Random Time Machine
- (2021) Dark Window Wave
- (2021) The Scarlet Trail of Stinging Tears (with Patrick Q. Wright)
- (2022) Conspiracy of Pylons
- (2022) The Concrete Diaries
- (2022) Anagramma (with Motion Kapture)
- (2022) Tales from the Trenches
- (2022) 100 Seconds To Midnight
- (2023) A Carrington Event
- (2023) Tease Seize....Apply
- (2023) Spectrescapes
- (2023) CybersKapes 2
- (2024) The Ruin

=== Singles and EPs ===
- (1984) Dance, China Doll
- (1992) The Char Char / Extracts from "The Inferno"
- (1993) Inferno / Illusion
- (1996) The Man Who Never Was
- (1999) Share The Day
- (2000) A Birth Marked Conspiracy
- (2000) Lactamase 01
- (2001) Meltdown
- (2002) Clara Rockmore's Dog
- (2002) 090301
- (2002) Lilith and The Rose
- (2005) Happy New Year
- (2008) Dream Logik X (a small voyage in 3 parts)
- (2008) Dream Logik 3333333333333
- (2008) Burning Church
- (2012) 11.11.11.11
- (2013) The Patriot / Last Man Standing
- (2020) Permission To Leave The Temple
- (2020) The Deep
- (2020) A Red Winter Night's Dream
- (2021) The Sympathy Portal
- (2021) Plus Ça Change (with Patrick Q Wright)
- (2023) All Flags Are False

=== Collections ===
- (1989) Perhaps We'll Only See A Thin Blue Line
- (1990) Lyvv, China Doll (cassette)
- (1993) Lyvv, China Doll (CD)
- (1995) Chyekk, China Doll / AaΔzhyd, China Doll
- (1995) Down in the City of Heartbreak and Needles
- (1996) Kowskijari
- (1997) The Carrion
- (1998) Down in the City of Heartbreak and Needles 2
- (2000) Needles Three
- (2007) Melancholics Anonymous
- (2008) Dream Logik Parts 1–3

=== Live albums ===
- (1987) Apples (Big!), China Doll
- (2000) Public Disturbance
- (2000) Angelus Obscuros (16-5-85)
- (2002) Khalash Nykow, China Doll (4-4-86)
- (2005) Live in Basel 2005 (with The Silverman)
- (2012) Live at Bibliotheque Hergé, Paris 2005
- (2012) Live in Denver 19 May 2012 (with The Silverman)
- (2014) The Greenhouse Effect (with The Silverman and Nicoletta Stephanz)
- (2015) Terremoto - Live In Chile 2008 (with The Silverman)

=== Compilation appearances ===
- (1985) Atomic Roses on 59 To 1 Cassette Nr. 6
- (1986) Jesus Wept on Is That You Santa Claus? Oscar's X-Mas Carols Vol. 3
- (1987) And The Lord Said, Rise on For Your Ears Only
- (1992) Hotel X on Mindfield
- (1993) The Colour Xhine on Tape A Break
- (1995) Dr. Blizz on The Gothic Compilation Part II
- (1996) The Forbidden Zone on Electrocity Vol. 7
- (1996) A Crack in Melancholy Space on A Blind Man's Gallery of Mirrors
- (1997) Atomic Roses 1995 (Pt. 1 & 2) on Globus And Decibel
- (2002) Burdon on Electrically Induced Vibrations
- (2003) Der Khataclimici 2 on Lactamase Bonus Compilation
- (2004) Complex on See Beyond The Music
- (2006) Sticks & Stones (Version) on Not Alone
- (2006) Sepia on Brainwaves
- (2010) Elvis of the Modern World on The Year 25 / 25 Years Korm Plastics
- (2010) Yam With Babe on Transmit Acoustique Abstraction 1/2
- (2010) The Bad Trip on Audiotron
