= Crystal ball (disambiguation) =

A crystal ball is a scrying or fortune telling orb object

Crystal Ball may also refer to:

- Crystal Ball (detector), a hermetic particle detector
- Crystal Ball function, a probability density function
- Crystal Ball (G.I. Joe), a fictional villain in the G.I. Joe universe, member of Cobra
- Sabato's Crystal Ball, a web site analyzing and predicting national political races
- "The Crystal Ball" (fairy tale), a German fairy tale collected by the Brothers Grimm
- The Crystal Ball (film), a 1943 film starring Ray Milland
- The Crystal Ball (painting), a 1902 painting by John William Waterhouse
- Crystal Ball, a "lifeline" in the Who Wants to Be a Millionaire? franchise

== Music ==
- Crystal Ball (band)

=== Albums ===
- Crystal Ball (box set), a 1998 box set by Prince
- Crystal Ball (EP), a 2019 EP by Purplebeck
- Crystal Ball (Styx album), a 1976 album by Styx
- Crystal Ball (unreleased album), album by Prince, recorded in 1986

=== Songs ===
- "Crystal Ball" (Keane song), a 2006 song by Keane
- "Crystal Ball" (Styx song), the 1976 album's title track
- "Crystal Ball", a song by Pink from the album Funhouse
- "Crystal Ball", a song by State Champs from the album Living Proof
- "Crystal Ball", a song by Timeflies from the album After Hours
- "Crystal Ball", a 1998 (recorded in 1986) Prince song from the box set of the same name.

== See also ==
- Cristóbal (disambiguation), Spanish equivalent of "Christopher"
- "Crystal Baller", a 2003 song by Third Eye Blind
- Krystal Ball, news anchor and former MSNBC co-host
