= The Clearing (Locrian album) =

Studio album by Locrian
- Released: November 1, 2011
- Genre: Doom metal, drone metal, drone, noise
- Length: 38:57
- Label: Fan Death Records
- Producer: Locrian

Locrian chronology
New Dominions (2011)	The Clearing (2011)	Bless Them That Curse You (2012)

Singles from The Clearing
- 1. "Chalk Point" Released: October 3, 2011

Professional ratings
Review scores
Source	Rating
AllMusic	4/5 stars
Pitchfork	7.4/10
Tiny Mix Tapes	4.5/5
Exclaim!	favorable
Brainwashed	favorable
The Inarguable	favorable

The Clearing is an album from drone rock band Locrian. It was originally released on November 1, 2011, through Fan Death Records and later re-released through Relapse Records with an additional album of material titled "The Final Epoch."

The first single off the album, "Chalk Point," was released on October 3, 2011.

== Track listing ==
No.	Title	Length
1.	"Chalk Point"	8:13
2.	"Augury In An Evaporating Tower"	6:39
3.	"Coprolite"	6:39
4.	"The Clearing"	17:26
Total length:		38:57

== Personnel ==
Credits adapted from All Music.

- André Foisy – guitar, ARP Avatar guitar synthesizer
- Terence Hannum – vocals, organ, synthesizers, piano
- Steven Hess – drums, tapes

=== Production ===
- Jeremy Lemos – recording engineer, mixing
- Jason Ward – mastering
- Brian Ulrich – artwork
