= HOSS Records =

- Type: Record Label
- Founded: 2004
- Headquarters: Brooklyn, NY, Atlanta, GA
- Key people: Brad Hurst, Tracy Soo-Ming, Nina Walia
- Website: http://hossrecords.com

HOSS Records is an experimental independent record label. HOSS was formed in 2004 and is currently based out of Brooklyn, New York, and Atlanta, Georgia. The label was active in the Baltimore, Maryland, music scene between 2007 and 2010 before entering "a year and a half spent lying in semi-limbo". As of 2011, the label is once again active.

== List of HOSS Records releases ==
- HOSS 001 - Jason Forrest/Ricky Rabbit - Blood Tax at Harvest Time/Shots: Vol. One (12" split EP)
- HOSS 002 - Excepter/Leblaze - The Troglodytes/Life in the Wilderness (12" split EP)
- HOSS 003 - WZT Hearts - Heat Chief (LP only; CD via Hit-Dat Records)
- HOSS 004 - Celephais - I Am Kuranes (CD [digipak])
- HOSS 005 - Ben Lawless - The King Congregation (unreleased)
- HOSS 006 - Zano Bathroom - Ebonomotopoeia (unreleased)
- HOSS 007 - Lichens/Lexie Mountain - Restoration of Temperament/If You So Choose… Live ATL '06 (LP)
- HOSS 008 - Atlas Sound/Mexcellent - Fractal Trax/Cornbread Jungle (split LP)
- HOSS 009 - Atlas Sound - How I Escaped the Prison of Fractals (unreleased)
- HOSS 010 - Food For Animals - Belly (LP, CD)
- HOSS 011 - Telepathe - Bells (12" single, unreleased)
- HOSS 012 - WZT Hearts - Threads Rope Spell Making Your Bones (LP)
- HOSS 013 - Deerhunter/Clockcleaner - Queerhunter/Cockcleaner (7"; unreleased)
- HOSS 014 - These Are Powers - Terrific Seasons (CD [digipak], 2xLP; re-released on Dead Oceans Records)
- HOSS 015 - Mi Ami - Techno 1.1 (12" EP)
- HOSS 016 - These Are Powers - Taro Tarot (CD [digipak]; re-released on Dead Oceans Records)
- HOSS 017 - Ecstatic Sunshine - Turned On (7" single)
- HOSS 018 - Jones - Jones Jones Jones (CD/LP)
- HOSS 019 - Ecstatic Sunshine - Yesterday's Work (LP)
- HOSS 020 - Food For Animals - New Balance (LP; unreleased)
- HOSS 021 - Dope Body - Nupping (LP, CD)
- HOSS 022 - Rick Rab - Prance (CS; forthcoming)
- HOSS 023 - Lyonnais - Want For Wish For Nowhere (LP, digital)
- HOSS 024 - Holy Ghost Party - The Weather Channel (LP; forthcoming)
- HOSS 025 - DJ Dog Dick - The Life Stains (LP, CD; forthcoming)
- HOSS 026 - Lexie Mountain Boys - Natural Feelings (CS; forthcoming)

== See also ==
- List of record labels
