= Mimir (disambiguation) =

Mímir is a primal figure of Norse mythology.

Mimir may also refer to:

- Mimir (band)
- Mimir (sculpture), a bronze and concrete sculpture by Keith Jellum
- Mimir (Planescape), a magical construct in the Dungeons & Dragons Planescape setting
- an alternate name of Regin in Norse mythology
- a character in the 2018 video game God of War
- Grafana Mimir, an open-source Prometheus-compatible time-series database
- MIMIR Quiz Format
