= Drenched Lands =

Studio album by Locrian
- Released: February 10, 2009
- Genre: Doom metal; drone metal
- Length: 64:23
- Label: Small Doses; At War With False Noise; Bloodlust!; Utech Records; Land of Decay
- Producer: Locrian

Locrian chronology
Drenched Lands (2009)	Territories (2010)

Professional ratings
Review scores
Source	Rating
All Music	4/5
Tiny Mix Tapes	4/5
Brainwashed	favorable
Chicago Tribune	favorable

Drenched Lands is the debut studio album from drone rock band Locrian. It was released on February 10, 2009 on CD from Small Doses and At War With False Noise, later on LP by Bloodlust!, and 8-track by Utech Records.

== Background ==
Drenched Lands was announced on January 4, 2009 and the press release for the album describes the album as "Locrian’s first full-length studio recording of new material." The album was initially released on CD through a collaboration between the U.S. based Small Doses record label and the U.K. based At War With False Noise label. The album was subsequently released on LP through the U.S. based Bloodlust! label.

The CD version of the album consisted of a bonus track titled "Greyfield Shrines" which was previously available as a limited edition LP. The LP version of the album consisted of a bonus 3 inch compact disc containing music recorded in January 2009 at WLUW on the Something Else broadcast.

== Artwork and title ==
The album’s cover photograph was taken at an abandoned section of U.S. Route 66. This part of the road was abandoned because of undermining on both sides of the road by Vulcan Materials.

In a 2009 interview, Hannum explained the title:

Drenched Lands comes from this William S. Burroughs novel The Soft Machine that was really influential to me. It is a line I really enjoyed from one of the cut up sections that I felt described best the dystopian dreamscape in the novel but also could apply to the decay I was envisioning with the record that I felt was like a projection to the future. Especially with the whole economic collapse in the US right now. To me the whole record, and its postscript "Greyfield Shrines", was trying to evoke a distressed landscape that has purged most human life from it. Some post-ecological trauma and the protagonist or disembodied viewer is drifting across this wasteland transmitting this loss back to a distant station.

== Reception ==
Critics generally noted that the album was the group’s first studio release after "several years of conducting one-off musical experiments, oftentimes issued in limited numbers and unconventional formats." At the time, Brainwashed referred to the group as "disturbingly prolific" and described the album as one of the group’s more subtle releases.

Upon its release, Drenched Lands received generally positive reviews from music critics. The Chicago Tribune referred to the album as "disturbing" due to the presence of "decaying guitars, howling, disembodied vocals and crumbing synths" and stated that the album "sounds a lot like the way the abandoned parts of Detroit look."

AllMusic noted that the album is characterized by a "brusque textural disconnect between each of the album’s songs," but gave the album a 4 out of 5 stars.

TinyMixTapes praised the album noting that the album "does justice to the art of litany and skree in ways that are refreshing, if not revelatory."

Invisible Oranges described the album as desolate and distorted and sometimes beautiful.

Pitchfork called the album "great" and found the album’s "excoriation of society is more of a way out than a mere self-excommunication."

== Track listing ==
No.	Title	Length
1.	"Obsolete Elegy in Effluvia and Dross"	2:09
2.	"Ghost Repeater"	10:35
3.	"Barren Temple Obscured by Contaminated Fogs"	6:10
4.	"Epicedium"	8:30
5.	"Obsolete Elegy in Cast Concrete"	6:50
6.	"Greyfield Shrines"	30:09
Total length:		64:23

== Personnel ==
- André Foisy – guitar
- Terence Hannum – vocals, organ, synthesizer, tape, guitar

=== Production ===
- Steve Beyerink – engineer, mixing
- Kelly Rix - artwork (highway images)
- Joe Pflieger - artwork (outer insert images)
- Jason Ward - Mastering
