= Mark Oreglia =

Mark J. Oreglia
- Born
- Citizenship: American
- Education: Stanford University (Ph.D., 1981)
- Known for: Experimental searches for the Higgs boson Detector development for the LHC and ILC
- Awards: APS Fellow (2018)
- Scientific career
- Fields: Particle physics
- Workplaces: University of Chicago; SLAC National Accelerator Laboratory
- Thesis: Study of the reactions psi' --> gamma gamma psi (1981)

Mark Joseph Oreglia (born 26 June, 1953) is an American experimental physicist and Professor Emeritus in the Department of Physics and the Enrico Fermi Institute at the University of Chicago. His research focuses on high-energy particle physics, specifically the experimental search for phenomena beyond the Standard Model and the structural design of advanced particle detector systems. He also serves as the Deputy Dean for Infrastructure for the university's Physical Sciences Division.

Oreglia is a principal member of the ATLAS experiment at CERN's Large Hadron Collider (LHC), where his work involves studying proton-proton collisions. He currently manages the United States' contribution to the hadronic calorimeter upgrade necessary for the High-Luminosity LHC. Prior to his work on the LHC, he contributed heavily to electron-positron collider physics, including searches for the Higgs boson on the OPAL experiment at the Large Electron–Positron Collider (LEP), and led detector research and development for the International Linear Collider. In 2018, he was elected a Fellow of the American Physical Society for his combined contributions to both collider physics analysis and detector design.

== Career ==
Oreglia completed his Ph.D. in physics at Stanford University in 1981. His early doctoral and post-doctoral research at the SLAC National Accelerator Laboratory involved the Crystal Ball detector collaboration, where he studied charmonium spectroscopy and the radiative decays of subatomic particles, including the J/ψ meson.
