= New Dominions =

Studio album by Horseback / Locrian
- Released: June 18, 2011
- Genre: Doom metal Drone metal Drone; Noise
- Length: 41:04
- Label: Relapse Records; Utech Records

Horseback / Locrian chronology
The Crystal World (2010)	New Dominions (2011)	The Clearing (2011)

Professional ratings
Review scores
Source	Rating
AllMusic	4/5 stars
Punknews	3.5/5
Exclaim	7/10
Spin	favorable
The Quietus	favorable

New Dominions is a collaborative album from Horseback and drone rock band Locrian. It was released as a single sided LP by Utech Records on June 18, 2011, and later on CD and digitally through Relapse Records.

== Track listing ==
No.	Title	Artist(s)	Length
1.	"The Gift"	Locrian & Horseback	5:52
2.	"Our Epitaph"	Locrian & Horseback	13:51
3.	"Oblivion Eaters"	Horseback	6:13
4.	"In The Absence of Light"	Locrian	6:27
5.	"The Gift (Remix by James Plotkin)"	Locrian & Horseback	8:41

== Personnel ==
Credits adapted from AllMusic.

Locrian

- André Foisy – guitars, percussion, noise
- Terence Hannum – vocals, keyboards, noise
- Steven Hess – drums, loops, percussion, noise

Horseback

- Jenks Miller – vocals, guitar, bass, percussion, noise

Production

- Jenks Miller – producer, engineer, editing, mixing
- James Plotkin – mastering (tracks 1–5), remixing (track 5)
