= Territories (album) =

Studio album by Locrian
- Released: June 6, 2010
- Genre: Doom metal; drone metal
- Length: 47:52
- Label: Small Doses; At War With False Noise; Bloodlust!; Basses Frequences
- Producer: Locrian

Locrian chronology
| Drenched Lands (2009) | Territories (2010) | The Crystal World (2010) |

Singles from Territories
- 1. "Procession of Ancestral Brutalism" Released: February 4, 2010; 2. "The Columnless Arcade" Released: April 14, 2010

Professional ratings
Review scores
| Source | Rating |
|---|---|
| AllMusic | 4/5 |
| Exclaim! | favorable |
| Brainwashed | favorable |
| The Quietus | favorable |
| The Sleeping Shaman | favorable |

Territories is the second studio album from drone rock band Locrian. It was released on March 6, 2010 on LP by Small Doses, At War With False Noise, Bloodlust!, and Basses Frequences.

== Background ==
The album was announced on January 6, 2010. The press release for the album describes the album as incorporating "elements from noise, power electronics, drone, and black metal to come up with a truly unique sound reflecting the sprawling urban decay surrounding them in Chicago." The album was initially released through a collaboration between multiple record labels: the U.S. based Small Doses record label, the U.S. based Bloodlust! record label, the U.K. based At War With False Noise label, and the French Basses Frequences label.

Territories was recorded in January 2009 at Phantom Manor Studios in Chicago, Illinois. The album features numerous collaborators including Blake Judd (Nachtmystium), Bruce Lamont (Yakuza), Mark Solotroff (Bloodyminded), and Andrew Scherer (Velnias).

== Lyrics ==
The band described the lyrics of the album as being influenced by the New Brutalism movement of architecture.

In a 2010 interview, Hannum described the lyrics on the album:

They're all kind of based off of [sic] architectural descriptions and this kind of bleak world...The whole first song came from this screed from the 19th century, in England, about industrialization. I thought it was really poetic when you kind of edited it down-- things hadn't changed that much. I really doubt most progress. I think that's really behind a lot of the lyrical content of the record, this doubt of this direction. Both André and I were kind of raised around hardcore music that felt that they had all the answers and kind of whacked you over the head all the time with...

== Reception ==
Critics generally praised the release. Pitchfork described the album as "a kaleidoscope of grays and black, where suffocating sustains and piercing feedback swirl deliberately with crippled blastbeats and mangled shouts." Rock-a-Rolla magazine described Territories as "an absolutely flooring album in an age where such things mean less and less."

Critics praised the contributions of the multiple guest musicians on the album. AllMusic noted that "its obvious that their pooled talents and distinct visions contributed significantly to Territories' oftentimes unique, if at times perplexingly diverse material. There's never a dull moment here, that's for sure."

== Track listing ==
| No. | Title | Length |
|---|---|---|
| 1. | "Inverted Ruins" | 8:35 |
| 2. | "Between Barrows" | 5:54 |
| 3. | "Procession of Ancestral Brutalism" | 10:49 |
| 4. | "Ring Road" | 9:42 |
| 5. | "Antediluvian Territory" | 4:03 |
| 6. | "The Columnless Arcade" | 8:49 |
| Total length: | | 47:52 |

== Personnel ==
Credits adapted from AllMusic.

Locrian

- André Foisy – bass guitar (1, 4), guitar (2, 3, 5, 6), acoustic guitar (6)
- Terence Hannum – synthesizer (1, 3, 4), organ (2, 5, 6), vocals (2, 3, 6), tapes (3, 5), guitar (6)

Guest musicians

- Mark Solotroff – vocals (1, 3, 4), synthesizer (4)
- Andrew Scherer – drums (1, 2, 6)
- Bruce Lamont – saxophone (2, 6), vocals (3)
- Blake Judd – guitar (3, 6), vocals (3)

Production

- Steve Beyerink – mixing, recording
- Joe Pflieger – photography
- Jason Ward – mastering
