= Ready to Howl =

Studio album by Birds of Maya
- Released: April 2010
- Genre: Garage rock, psychedelic rock
- Length: 46:03
- Label: Richie

Birds of Maya chronology
Vol. 1 (2008)	Ready to Howl (2010)	Celebration (2013)

Ready to Howl is the second studio album by Birds of Maya, released in April 2010 by Richie Records. In 2012, Agitated Records re-issued the album on CD appended with the Regulation 7" single.

== Track listing ==
All tracks are written by Jason Killinger, Ben Leaphart and Mike Polizze.

Side one
No.	Title	Length
1.	"Ready to Howl"	3:27
2.	"Porch Dude" (part 1)	8:21

Side two
No.	Title	Length
1.	"Porch Dude" (part 2)	11:47

Side three
No.	Title	Length
1.	"Heavy on Sunday" (part 1)	11:15

Side four
No.	Title	Length
1.	"Heavy on Sunday" (part 2)	11:16

CD track listing
No.	Title	Length
1.	"Ready to Howl"	3:27
2.	"Porch Dude"	20:08
3.	"Heavy on Sunday"	22:31
4.	"[untitled]"	3:58
5.	"[untitled]"	3:44

== Personnel ==
Adapted from the Ready to Howl liner notes.

Birds of Maya

- Jason Killinger – bass guitar
- Ben Leaphart – drums
- Mike Polizze – electric guitar

== Release history ==
Region	Date	Label	Format	Catalog
United States	2010	Richie	LP	RR / TT #25
United Kingdom	2012	Agitated	CD	AGIT 016
