= War Photographer (disambiguation) =

War Photographer is a 2001 documentary by Christian Frei.

War Photographer may also refer to:

- War photography, the profession
- War Photographer, a music video by Jason Forrest
- War Photographer, a poem by Carol Ann Duffy
