= Crystal Globe =

A Crystal Globe is a trophy given to the winners of various international competitions:

== In media ==
- Crystal Globe (Karlovy Vary International Film Festival), for films
- Globe de Cristal Awards, for art and culture

== In sport ==
Given to the season standings leaders of:

- FIS Alpine Ski World Cup, overall and by discipline
- FIS Freestyle Ski World Cup, overall and by discipline
- Biathlon World Cup, overall and by discipline
- Bobsleigh World Cup, by discipline
- Crystal Globe (Short Track Speed Skating), an annual award for the overall winner of the ISU Short Track World Tour
- Skeleton World Cup, by discipline

== See also ==
- Crystal ball (disambiguation)
- Crystal World (disambiguation)
