= Vol. 1 (Birds of Maya album) =

Studio album by Birds of Maya
- Released: January 21, 2008
- Recorded: 2004 – 2006
- Genre: Garage rock, psychedelic rock
- Length: 35:39
- Label: Holy Mountain

Birds of Maya chronology
Vol. 1 (2008)	Ready to Howl (2010)

Vol. 1 is the debut studio album by Birds of Maya, released on January 21, 2008, by Holy Mountain. The album comprises home recordings made between 2004 and 2006.

== Track listing ==
All tracks are written by Jason Killinger, Ben Leaphart and Mike Polizze.

Side one
No.	Title	Length
1.	"Killer in the Snow"	6:07
2.	"Traveler"	3:39
3.	"High up on the Hill"	7:08

Side two
No.	Title	Length
1.	"Black Foot Kin"	5:26
2.	"Ancient Witches Rise"	8:02
3.	"Six"	1:53
4.	"Sleepwalker"	3:24

== Personnel ==
Adapted from the Vol. 1 liner notes.

Birds of Maya

- Jason Killinger – bass guitar
- Ben Leaphart – drums
- Mike Polizze – electric guitar

== Release history ==
Region	Date	Label	Format	Catalog
United States	2008	Holy Mountain	LP	12288LP
