= Crystal World (disambiguation) =

Crystal World or The Crystal World may refer to:

== Music ==
- Crystal World, 2013 album by Marnie
- The Crystal World (album), 2010 album by Locrian
- Mundo de Cristal (Crystal World), 1991 album by Thalía

== Literature ==
- The Crystal World, 1966 novel by J. G. Ballard
- "Crystal World" (short story), 1991 short story by Victor Pelevin

== Other ==
- Swarovski Kristallwelten (Crystal Worlds), tourist attraction in Austria

== See also ==
- World crystal, theoretical model in cosmology
- Crystal Globe (disambiguation), trophy given to the winners of various international competitions
