= Fan Death Records =

- Founded: 2008
- Genre: Punk, noise rock, experimental rock, black metal
- Country of origin: U.S., Canada
- Location: Baltimore, Maryland; Montreal, Quebec
- Official website: www.fandeathrecords.com

Fan Death Records is an independent record label based in Baltimore, Maryland, and Montreal, Quebec. The label is operated by Sean Gray, Chris Berry, and Tracy Soo-Ming.

Fan Death is affiliated with DNA Test Fest, a noise rock and experimental music festival held in Baltimore every year. The label began in 2007 in with Gray's radio show DNA in the DNA on WMUC-FM in College Park, Maryland.

== Discography ==
- FDR-001 - Clockcleaner - Ready To Fight 12"
- FDR-002 - Drunkdriver - Knife Day 7"
- FDR-003 - Ringo Deathstarr - Ringo Deathstarr 12"
- FDR-004 - Taco Leg - Freemason's Hall 7"
- FDR-005 - Lamps - The Role Of The Dogcatcher In African-American Urban Folklore 7"
- FDR-006 - Pygmy Shrews - Lord Got Busted 7"
- FDR-007 - The New Flesh - Demo CS (reissue)
- FDR-008 - Locrian - Rain of Ashes CS
- FDR-009 - FNU Ronnies - Golem Smoke CS (US issue)
- FDR-010 - Pfisters – Narcicity LP
- FDR-011 - Broken Neck - Fights Over Nothing CS
- FDR-012 - The Chickens - s/t CS
- FDR-013 - Puerto Rico Flowers - 4 12"
- FDR-014 - Jason Urick – This Is Critical 7″
- FDR-015 - Twin Stumps – Live at Shea Stadium CS (benefit for Mike Yaniro)
- FDR-016 - Neon Blud – Whipps 7″
- FDR-017 - Psychedelic Horseshit – Acid Tape CS
- FDR-018 - Screen Vinyl Image - Ice Station CS
- FDR-018EP - Screen Vinyl Image – Siberian Eclipse 7″
- FDR-019 - Broken Water – Normal Never Happened 7″
- FDR-020 - Twin Stumps - Seedbed LP/CD
- FDR-021 - Puerto Rico Flowers - 2 7"
- FDR-022 - Bodycop - s/t CS
- FDR-023 - Pleasure Leftists - Together Apart 12"
- FDR-024 - Homostupids - Great Music Collection CS
- FDR-025 - Puerto Rico Flowers - 7 12"
- FDR-026 - To Live and Shave in L.A. - The Cortège 12"
- FDR-027 - Leather - Wretch 7"
- FDR-028 - Locrian - The Clearing LP
- FDR-029 - Ed Schrader's Music Beat - Welcome to the Roman Empire CS
- FDR-030 - Roomrunner CS
- FDR-031 - Überchriist - s/t CS
- FDR-032 - Woollen Kits CS
- FDR-033 - Roomrunner - Super Vague + Live @ WFMU CS
- FDR-034 - Taco Leg - s/t LP
- FDR-035 - Purling Hiss - A Little Off-Center (Live at WFMU) CS
- FDR-036 - Roomrunner - Ideal Cities CD/LP
- FDR-095 - Clockcleaner - Nevermind 12"

== See also ==
- List of record labels
