= Paisley Montage =

Compilation album by Purling Hiss
- Released: 2011
- Recorded: 2007–2011
- Studio: various locations, Philadelphia, PA
- Genre: Indie rock, psychedelic rock
- Length: 39:37
- Label: Richie (re-issue)

Purling Hiss chronology
Dizzy Polizzy (2011)	Paisley Montage (2011)	Water on Mars (2013)

Paisley Montage is a compilation album by Purling Hiss, released independently in 2011. Before being re-issued by Richie Records in 2013, it was distributed on Compact Cassette by the band during their 2011 tour. In his review for Pitchfork Media, Marc Masters said the album "indulges nicely in Polizze’s preferred tropes—heavy guitar and a simple, lurching beat—but eventually descends into an aural madness of searing distortion, echoing voices, and dislocated finger snaps."

== Track listing ==
All tracks are written by Mike Polizze.

Side one
No.	Title	Length
1.	"Gitar Damage 1"	3:18
2.	"Gitar Damage 2"	4:10
3.	"Gitar Damage 3"	3:36

Side two
No.	Title	Length
1.	"Paisley Dommage 1"	4:29
2.	"Paisley Dommage 2"	1:42
3.	"Paisley Dommage 3"	3:21
4.	"Paisley Dommage 4"	1:38
5.	"Paisley Dommage 5"	5:38

== Personnel ==
Adapted from the Paisley Montage liner notes.

- Mike Polizze – vocals, instruments

== Release history ==
Region	Date	Label	Format	Catalog
United States	2011	self-released	CS	
United States	2013	Richie	LP	RR//TT37
