= The Crystal World (album) =

Studio album by Locrian
- Released: November 27, 2010
- Genre: Doom metal; drone metal; drone; noise
- Length: 101:25
- Label: Utech Records
- Producer: Locrian

Locrian chronology
Territories (2010)	The Crystal World (2010)	New Dominions (2011)

Professional ratings
Review scores
Source	Rating
Tiny Mix Tapes	4/5
AllMusic	3.5/5 stars
The Sleeping Shaman	favorable
Scene Point Blank	8.5/10

The Crystal World is an album from drone rock band Locrian. It was released on November 27, 2010, through Utech Records.

== Background ==
Locrian announced the release of The Crystal World on September 8, 2010. The press release for the album describes the album as the groups first with percussionist Steven Hess and “finds the group manipulating tones and textures that transport the listener to an apocalyptic wasteland.” The album was titled after, and the lyrics inspired by, JG Ballard’s novel The Crystal World.

The album was remastered and reissued in June 2025 for its 15th anniversary.

== Track listing ==
No.	Title	Length
1.	"Triumph of Elimination"	5:28
2.	"At Night's End"	7:19
3.	"The Crystal World"	5:37
4.	"Pathogens"	11:01
5.	"Obsidian Facades"	7:36
6.	"Elevations and Depths"	10:44
7.	"Extinction"	53:40
Total length:		101:25

== Personnel ==
Credits adapted from All Music.

- André Foisy – guitar
- Terence Hannum – synthesizers, vocals
- Steven Hess – drums
- Erica Burgner - vocals
- Gretchen Koehler - violin

=== Production ===
- Dave Whitcomb - engineer
- Justin Bartlett / VBERKVLT - artwork
- James Plotkin - mastering
