= The Unrelenting Songs of the 1979 Post Disco Crash =

Studio album by Jason Forrest
- Released: April 27, 2004
- Recorded: January 2001 – October 2003
- Studio: Cock Rock Studios, Williamsburg, Brooklyn
- Genre: Breakcore; IDM
- Length: 43:39
- Label: Sonig
- Producer: Jason Forrest

Jason Forrest chronology
The Unrelenting Songs of the 1979 Post Disco Crash (2004)	Shamelessly Exciting (2005)

The Unrelenting Songs of the 1979 Post Disco Crash is a 2004 studio album by American breakcore musician Jason Forrest.

== Critical reception ==
Professional ratings
Review scores
Source	Rating
AllMusic	4.5/5 stars
Pitchfork	8.5/10
Spin	B+
Stylus Magazine	A−

Tim Sendra of AllMusic gave the album 4.5 stars out of 5, describing it as "a Day-Glo burst of wacked-out samples, clattering percussion, sun-kissed melodies, and general electronic insanity. Nate De Young of Stylus Magazine gave the album a grade of A−, saying, "the cockrock-cum-disco king unwittingly uses sampling as a critique of taste that is jaw-dropping and, more importantly, booty-shaking."

In 2017, Pitchfork placed the album at number 50 on its list of "The 50 Best IDM Albums of All Time".

== Track listing ==
No.	Title	Length
1.	"Spectacle to Refute All Judgments"	3:44
2.	"Satan Cries Again" (featuring Dan Walsh)	4:33
3.	"An Event (helicopter_passing--(edit)--251001.mp3)"	3:01
4.	"180 Mar Ton"	3:18
5.	"INKhUK"	5:52
6.	"Recording in a Nice Venue"	0:50
7.	"Stepping Off"	3:48
8.	"Big Outrageous Sound Club"	5:28
9.	"Ceci N'est Pas du Disco"	4:51
10.	"Why I Love ELO"	1:58
11.	"10 Amazing Years"	6:11
