= Public Service Announcement (album) =

Studio album by Purling Hiss
- Released: October 12, 2010
- Recorded: 2007
- Studio: Mike Polizze's home studio, Philadelphia, PA
- Genre: Indie rock, psychedelic rock, experimental rock, garage rock
- Length: 41:13
- Label: Woodsist

Purling Hiss chronology
Hissteria (2010)	Public Service Announcement (2010)	Lounge Lizards (2011)

Professional ratings
Review scores
Source	Rating
Pitchfork Media	(7.4/10)

Public Service Announcement is the third studio album by Purling Hiss, released on October 12, 2010, by Woodsist.

== Track listing ==
All tracks are written by Mike Polizze.

Side one
No.	Title	Length
1.	"Run From the City"	5:16
2.	"Porch Dude/Slight Return"	4:21
3.	"Don't Even Try It"	3:35
4.	"Bedroom"	0:42
5.	"Ojos Locos"	2:16
6.	"Gypsy"	3:58

Side two
No.	Title	Length
1.	"Zor"	1:58
2.	"Goodbye Blue"	2:09
3.	"Beautiful Earth Creature"	3:19
4.	"Malice in Wonderland"	5:34
5.	"Doghouse"	2:52
6.	"1976"	4:50

== Personnel ==
Adapted from the Public Service Announcement liner notes.

- Mike Polizze – vocals, instruments
- Aaron Haze Biscoe – photography

== Release history ==
Region	Date	Label	Format	Catalog
United States	2010	Woodsist	LP	Woodsist047
