= Network Awesome =

- Website type: Online television network
- Creator: Jason Forrest
- Website: www.networkawesome.com
- Registration: No
- Launched: January 1, 2011
- Current status: Inactive

Network Awesome was an online TV broadcasting outlet launched by electronic musician Jason Forrest and co-founder Greg Sadetsky on January 1, 2011.

Network Awesome also includes a magazine with the goal of providing commentary and analysis of the featured content via daily articles. The magazine is syndicated by Huffington Post and DigBoston.

Since August 23, 2018 the site is inactive and no longer allows access to the site's content, showing a "stay tuned!" message on the homepage.

As of November 25, 2020 the site is completely inaccessible.
