= Birds of Maya =

- Origin: Philadelphia, Pennsylvania, US
- Genres: Noise rock
- Years active: 2004–present
- Labels: Richie
- Members: Jason Killinger; Ben Leaphart; Mike Polizze

Birds of Maya is an American psychedelic/garage rock band based out of Philadelphia. Formed in 2004, the band is composed of guitarist Mike Polizze, bassist Jason Killinger, and drummer Ben Leaphart. The trio plays a lo-fi mixture of hard rock and blues rock.

To date, the band has released four studio albums: Vol. 1 (2008), Ready to Howl (2010), Celebration (2013) and Valdez (2021).

== History ==
Birds of Maya was formed when Jason Killinger and Ben Leaphart decided they wanted to form a band. Guitarist Mike Polizze joined when he answered an ad by the band requesting an additional member. The band's debut, 2008's Vol. 1, was released as a CD-R and comprises recordings dating between 2004 and 2006.

The band's second album. Ready to Howl. was released in 2010. The band collaborated with Harmonica Dan for their 7" single Regulation, which was released exclusively when the band was on tour. Mike Polizze turned his attention to his solo project Purling Hiss and was joined by Ben Leaphart so they could perform as a live act. This effectively put Birds of Maya on hold until they released Celebration in 2013.

In 2021, the band released, Valdez, its first studio album in eight years. The album was released to critical acclaim and was included on Pitchfork's "31 Best Rock Albums of 2021" end-of-year list.

== Discography ==
Studio albums

- Vol. 1 (2008)
- Ready to Howl (2010)
- Celebration (2013)
- Valdez (2021)

Singles

- w/Harmonica Dan: Regulation (2010)
