= Water on Mars (album) =

Studio album by Purling Hiss
- Released: March 19, 2013
- Recorded: Spring – summer 2012
- Studio: Uniform Recording, Philadelphia, PA
- Genre: Indie rock
- Length: 32:56
- Label: Drag City
- Producer: Adam Granduciel, Mike Polizze, Jeff Zeigler

Purling Hiss chronology
Paisley Montage (2011)	Water on Mars (2013)	Weirdon (2014)

Professional ratings
Review scores
Source	Rating
Allmusic	4/5 stars
Drowned in Sound	(8/10)
Exclaim!	(7/10)
Pitchfork Media	(7.3/10)
Spin	(7/10)

Water on Mars is the fourth studio album by Purling Hiss, which was released on March 19, 2013, in Drag City.

== Track listing ==
All tracks are written by Mike Polizze.

No.	Title	Length
1.	"Lolita"	4:27
2.	"Mercury Retrograde"	3:32
3.	"Rat Race"	3:04
4.	"Dead Again"	1:36
5.	"She Calms Me Down"	2:44
6.	"Face Down"	3:33
7.	"The Harrowing Wind"	3:47
8.	"Water on Mars"	7:09
9.	"Mary Bumble Bee"	3:04

== Personnel ==
Adapted from the Water on Mars liner notes.

Purling Hiss

- Kiel Everett – bass guitar
- Mike Polizze – vocals, electric guitar, production, cover art
- Mike Sneeringer – drums

Production and additional personnel

- Paul Gold – mastering
- Adam Granduciel – production, piano (5)
- Jason Killinger – cover art
- Jeff Zeigler – production, recording

== Release history ==
Region	Date	Label	Format	Catalog
United States	2013	Drag City	CD, CS, LP	DC533
