= Infinite Dissolution =

Studio album by Locrian
- Released: July 24, 2015
- Genres: Doom metal, drone metal, drone, noise
- Length: 47:25
- Label: Relapse Records
- Producer: Locrian

Locrian chronology
Return to Annihilation (2013)	Infinite Dissolution (2015)

Singles from Infinite Dissolution
- 1. "An Index of Air" Released: June 1, 2015; 2. "Heavy Water" Released: June 18, 2015; 3. "Arc of Extinction" Released: July 9, 2015; 4. "Dark Shales" Released: July 16, 2015

Professional ratings
Aggregate scores
Source	Rating
Metacritic	83/100
Review scores
Source	Rating
AllMusic	4.5/5 stars
Pitchfork	8.2/10
Echoes and Dust	favorable
Consequence of Sound	B
Exclaim!	8/10
PopMatters	7/10
The Quietus	favorable
Dusted	favorable

Infinite Dissolution is an album from the drone rock band Locrian. It was released on July 24, 2015, through Relapse Records.

The first single off the album, "An Index of Air" was released digitally on June 1, 2015. Locrian released a music video directed by Raymond Salvatore Harmon for the track "Arc of Extinction" on July 29, 2015, through NPR.

== Background ==
Infinite Dissolution was announced on May 21, 2015, and the press release of the album describes it as a concept record "dealing with the struggle of human extinction."

The group took inspiration for the album from Elizabeth Kolbert's study of mass extinction and climate change, The Sixth Extinction.

== Reception ==
The album generally received favorable responses from critics and fans alike. Pitchfork Media gave the album a positive review, rating the album at 8.2 out of 10 and praising the album as being the group's "most adventurous and accessible" album yes from the "once-prohibitively esoteric" group. Consequence of Sound gave the album a B and compared looking into the photo of sculptor David Altmejd's The Eye on the album's cover was like "peering into the world of the album: as mesmerizing as it is disorienting." NPR's Lars Gotrich stated that the trio "is at the height of its holistic metallic powers on Infinite Dissolution." PopMatters gave the album 7 out of 10 stars and called the release thoughtful and dynamic and generally praised the release. Exclaim gave the album an 8 out of 10 review ending their review by stating that "Infinite Dissolution is full of haunted love songs between a fallen city and the ghosts that inhabit it; it fills a void that I never knew existed until this unsettling, aching sound poured in."

The album currently has a score of 83 on Metacritic, indicating "universal acclaim".

Jason Heller of the A.V. Club ranked Infinite Dissolution as his top album of 2015.

== Track listing ==
No.	Title	Length
1.	"Arc of Extinction"	7:16
2.	"Dark Shales"	6:28
3.	"KXL I"	6:56
4.	"The Future of Death"	3:38
5.	"An Index of Air"	7:51
6.	"KXL II"	3:46
7.	"The Great Dying"	5:48
8.	"Heavy Water"	4:11
9.	"KXL III"	1:34
Total length:		47:25

== Personnel ==
Credits adapted from Allmusic.

=== Drone ===
- André Foisy – guitar, electronics
- Terence Hannum – synthesizer (Moog Little Phatty, Moog Minitaur, Moog Source, MicroKorg, ARP Avatar, EDP Wasp, Mellotron M400), sampler
- Steven Hess – drums, percussion, electronics
- Erica Burgner - vocals
- Dana Schecter - lap steel guitar

=== Production ===
- Greg Norman – recording and mixing at Electrical Audio
- David Altmejd – artwork
- Jacob Speis – layout
