= Food for Animals =

American hip hop group

- Origin: Washington, D.C., District of Columbia, U.S.
- Genres: Hip hop, underground hip hop, noise
- Years active: 2001–2011
- Past members: Nick Rivetti; Andrew Field-Pickering; Daniel Helmer; Sterling Warren
- Website: foodforanimals.wordpress.com

Food for Animals were an American hip hop group formed in 2001 near Washington, D.C. The group featured Vulture Voltaire (Andrew Field-Pickering), Ricky Rabbit (Nick Rivetti), Dr. Dan (Daniel Helmer), and HY (Sterling Warren). Their music was generally categorized as underground hip hop with a strong tendency towards noise music. According to Pitchfork, their latest albums feature a sound best appreciated by "those with a high tolerance for serial grime and a taste for the sharper, harder edge of hip-hop".

== History ==
Field Pickering, a Washington, D.C. DJ, and Ricky Rabbit formed the band and quickly booked gigs along the East Coast, shows which occasionally caused comparisons with Public Enemy and found praise from critics.

== Discography ==
Food For Animals

- Strictly Ricky (2003)
- Scavengers (2004, Muckamuck Produce/Upper Class)
- Belly Remixes (2005)
- Belly (2008, HOSS Records/Cockrockdisco)

Ricky's Remixes

- Mi Ami - African Rhythms (rRicky Remix) (2008)
- K-Swift - (Ricky Screwed Mix) (2008)
- Late Summer (2009)
- Ecstatic Sunshine - Turned On (rRicky Remix) (2009)
- Lexie Mountain Boys (Ricky Remix) (2009)
- Bluebird - (rRicky Remix) (2009)

Maxmillion Dunbar (Vulture V)

Albums

- Cool Water (2010, Ramp Records)
- House of Woo (2013, RVNG Intl.)
- Boost (2016, Future Times)
- Many Any (2019, 1432 R)

Singles & EPs

- Outrageous Soulz / Dreamerzzz (2008, Future Times)
- Bare Feet EP (2009, Ramp Recordings)
- Girls Dream (2010, Ramp Recordings)
- Max Trax For World Peace (2011, Future Times)
- Everyday EP (2011, L.I.E.S. Records)
- Woo (2012, RVNG Intl.)
- Orgies Of The Hemp Eaters (2012, Future Times)
- Polo (Versions) (2012, Live At Robert Johnson)
- Drizzling Glass (2014, The Trilogy Tapes)
- Highlife (2014, Hot Haus Recs)
- This Ain't Tom N' Jerry / Chewy (2014, Berceuse Heroique)
- Shoegaze (2014, Falstaff)
- Shaping EP (2015, Off Minor Recordings)

Compilations

- Feel Free (2007)

DJ Mixes

- LWE Podcast 130 (2012, Little White Earbuds)
- FACT Mix 374 (2013, FACT MAGAZINE)
- Woo Daps Mix Tape (2013, RVNG Intl.)
- Unwind Flex (2014, XLR8R)
- People Are Tripping (2018, The Trilogy Tapes)

Miscellaneous

- Berceuse Heroique Presents The B Sides (2015, Berceuse Heroique)
- Truancy Volume 53: Maxmillion Dunbar (2020, Ndeya, Warp Records)

Dolo Percussion (Vulture V)

Singles & EPs

- Dolo Percussion (2013, L.I.E.S Records)
- Dolo 2 (2014, Future Times)
- Dolo 3 (2018, The Trilogy Tapes)

Compilations

- Dolo 4 (2019, Future Times)

Ricky Rabbit

- *** I GOT U *** (single PRANCE) (2012)
- DOG DIMENSION (2013)
- BRAIDED ROPE 158 (Lo Mix) (2020)
- BRAIDED ROPE 158 (Ride Mix) (2020)
- CENTIPEDE (Ft. PSYCHO EGYPTIAN) (2021)
- PRANCE (2013) (2021)
