= Return to Annihilation =

Studio album by Locrian
- Released: June 25, 2013
- Genres: Doom metal, drone metal, black metal, drone, noise
- Length: 49:50
- Label: Relapse Records
- Producer: Locrian

Locrian chronology
Locrian & Christoph Heemann (2012)	Return to Annihilation (2013)	Infinite Dissolution (2015)

Professional ratings
Aggregate scores
Source	Rating
Metacritic	80/100
Review scores
Source	Rating
Pitchfork	8.0/10
Consequence Of Sound	C+
Exclaim!	9/10
Popmatters	7/10
Tiny Mix Tapes	3.5/5

Return to Annihilation is an album from the drone rock band Locrian. It was released on June 25, 2013, through Relapse Records.

== Background ==
Return to Annihilation was announced on April 25, 2013, through a press releases which described the release as the band's “Relapse Records” full-length debut.

The group was inspired by the “band’s love for prog-rock progenitors Genesis, Yes & King Crimson.”

== Reception ==
The album generally received favorable responses from critics and fans alike. Pitchfork Media gave the album a positive review, rating the album at 8 out of 10 and praising the album as being the group's “most provocative and engaging album to date.” Consequence of Sound gave the album a C+ and noted that the band had added variety to their songwriting on the album, incorporating aspects of black metal and blissful shoegaze. They added that the group are transposing the black metal template onto other genres along with their "contemporaries Deafheaven and Sunn O)))."

The album currently has a score of 80 on Metacritic, indicating “generally favorable reviews.”

Spin magazine included the release in their list of the "Best 20 Metal Albums of 2013" and ranked the album at number four.

== Track listing ==
No.	Title	Length
1.	"Eternal Return"	2:51
2.	"A Visitation from the Wrath of Heaven"	8:25
3.	"Two Moons"	4:26
4.	"Return to Annihilation": a. "Into One Light"; b. "Anathemata"; c. "All Mineral in Upheaval"	6:45
5.	"Exiting the Hall of Vapor and Light"	5:15
6.	"Panorama of Mirrors"	6:38
7.	"Obsolete Elegies": a. "Isostasy"; b. "Digression of Air"; c. "Hydriotaphia"; d. "In Felsic Splendor"	15:30
Total length:		49:50

== Personnel ==
Locrian

- André Foisy – electric guitar, acoustic guitar, bass guitar, Moog Minitaur analog bass synthesizer, mixing
- Terence Hannum – vocals, Moog Little Phatty, Moog Satellite, ARP Quartet, microKORG, and EDP Wasp synthesizers, piano, Mellotron, mixing
- Steven Hess – drums, percussion, timpani, Simmons SDS1 electronic drums, electronics, mixing

Production

- Greg Norman – recording, mixing
- Jason Ward – mastering
- Richard Misrach – photography
- Jacob Speis – layout
