= Dead Neanderthals =

Dutch jazz band

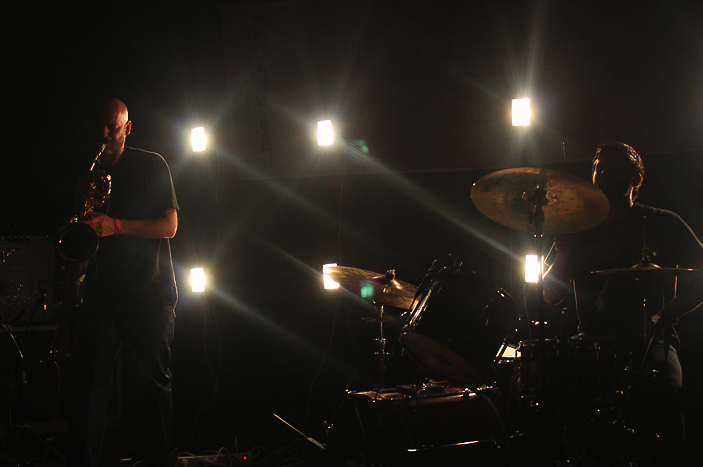

Background information
- Origin: Netherlands
- Genres: Free-jazz, metal, grind-core
- Years active: 2012–present
- Labels: Gaffer Records, Raw Tonk, Utech Records
- Members: Otto Kokke, Rene Aquarius
- Website: deadneanderthals.wordpress.com

Dead Neanderthals is a two-person Dutch free-jazz band that has incorporated metal and grindcore. They have released several albums, many of which were based on improvisation, and have been called "one of Europe’s premier experimental free jazz duos."

The band is composed of two members: Otto Kokke on saxophone and synthesizer and René Aquarius on drums. After first collaborating online, they began improvising live, and have released several albums. The Quietus described their 2012 album Jazzhammer/Stormannsgalskap as a mighty "pounding headache of rampaging blastbeats, distorted foghorn drones and radioactive seagull squalls." Their fourth album Polaris was, in contrast, completely acoustic.

== Style ==
According to The Quietus, "Whether forcing the twitching viscera of free jazz through a grindcore blender, slicing the eyeball of European improvisation with a metal blade, or eviscerating the whole lot in a maelstrom of noise, the sax-drums duo of Otto Kokke and Rene Aquarius pay little heed to the boundaries of genre." A 2023 interview in Decibel called them an "avant noise metal duo."

== Discography ==
Albums by Dead Neanderthals (incomplete list)
| Date | Title | Label | Notes |
|---|---|---|---|
| 2012 | Jazzhammer / Stormannsgalskap | Self-released | |
| 2013 | Polaris | Utech Records | |
| 2013 | ...And It Ended Badly | Gaffer Records, Raw Tonk | |
| 2016 | Live at Roadburn 2016 | Roadburn Records | Recorded at the Roadburn Festival |
| 2017 | Molar Wrench | Hominid Sounds | Collaboration with Sly and the Family Drone |
| 2019 | Ghosts | Utech Records | |
| 2022 | Metal | Utech Records | |
| 2022 | Click | self-released | |
| 2023 | Specters | Utech Records | With Scott Hedrick on guitar |
| 2023 | Gilded Form | Burning World Records | With Nick Millevoi on guitar |
| 2023 | Ordo Dracul Demo | self-released | EP |

Molar Wrench was listed by one reviewer in The Guardian's summary of the best music of 2017.
