= Lounge Lizards (EP) =

Public Service Announcement

EP by Purling Hiss
- Released: June 14, 2011
- Genre: Garage rock, psychedelic rock
- Length: 23:03
- Label: Mexican Summer

Purling Hiss chronology
Public Service Announcement (2011)	Public Service Announcement (2011)	Dizzy Polizzy (2011)

Professional ratings
Review scores
Source	Rating
Pitchfork Media	(7.5/10)

Lounge Lizards is an EP by Purling Hiss, released on June 14, 2011 by Mexican Summer.

== Track listing ==
All tracks are written by Mike Polizze.

Side one
No.	Title	Length
1.	"Voices"	5:16
2.	"The Hoodoo"	4:21
3.	"Midnight Man"	3:35

Side two
No.	Title	Length
1.	"Been Teased"	1:58
2.	"City Wide Special"	2:09
3.	"Karaoke Nite"	3:19

== Personnel ==
Adapted from the Lounge Lizards liner notes.

- Mike Polizze – vocals, instruments

== Release history ==
Region	Date	Label	Format	Catalog
United States	2011	Mexican Summer	LP	MEX 094
