= Crystal Ball function =

Probability density function

Examples of the Crystal Ball function.

The Crystal Ball function, named after the Crystal Ball Collaboration (hence the capitalized initial letters), is a probability density function (PDF) commonly used to model various lossy processes in high-energy physics such as Bremsstrahlung by electrons. It consists of a Gaussian core portion and a power-law low-end tail, below a certain threshold. The function itself and its first derivative are both continuous.

The Crystal Ball function is given by:

$$f(x;\alpha,n,\bar x,\sigma) = N \cdot \begin{cases} \exp(- \frac{(x - \bar x)^2}{2 \sigma^2}), & \mbox{for }\frac{x - \bar x}{\sigma} > -\alpha \\
A \cdot (B - \frac{x - \bar x}{\sigma})^{-n}, & \mbox{for }\frac{x - \bar x}{\sigma} \leqslant -\alpha \end{cases} ,$$

where

$$A = \left(\frac{n}{\left| \alpha \right|}\right)^n \cdot \exp\left(- \frac {\left| \alpha \right|^2}{2}\right)$$,
$$B = \frac{n}{\left| \alpha \right|}  - \left| \alpha \right|$$,
$$N = \frac{1}{\sigma (C + D)}$$,
$$C = \frac{n}{\left| \alpha \right|} \cdot \frac{1}{n-1} \cdot \exp\left(- \frac {\left| \alpha \right|^2}{2}\right)$$,
$$D = \sqrt{\frac{\pi}{2}} \left(1 + \operatorname{erf}\left(\frac{\left| \alpha \right|}{\sqrt 2}\right)\right)$$,

with the error function erf.

The parameters of the function (that are usually determined by a fit) are:

- $N$ is a normalization factor (Skwarnicki 1986)
- $\alpha>0$ defines the point where the PDF changes from a power-law to a Gaussian distribution
- $n>1$ is the power of the power-law tail
- $\bar x$ and $\sigma$ are the mean and the standard deviation of the Gaussian
