= Christoph Heemann =

German musician

Christoph Heemann (born 1964) is a German musician. He was born in Aachen, West Germany.

Heemann has recorded under his own name, with the tape music group H.N.A.S. (German: Hirsche Nicht Aufs Sofa, meaning "No deer on the sofa" or "deer not on the sofa"), and with many collaborators in alternative rock, soundtrack production and visual arts.

== Early years and creation of H.N.A.S. ==
Heemann's early favorites included Van Dyke Parks, and offbeat experimentalists like American West Coast radicals The Residents, Tuxedomoon, Chrome, MX-80 Sound and Renaldo and the Loaf.

Though his hometown featured some notable experimental rock groups (like Rufus Zuphall and Necronomicon), Heemann was largely unaware of them and of the larger "Krautrock" movement until introduced to it via British or American friends. Largely self-taught in electronic equipment, Heemann started out as a "non-musician" with acquaintance Achim P. Li Khan. The duo's influences at the time included Chrome, Jac Berrocal (France) and Nurse With Wound. These activities finally led to the creation of the "Faust"-influenced unit "H.N.A.S." (i.e. Hirsche Nicht Aufs Sofa, roughly "Deer not on the Sofa") after meeting up with Steven Stapleton from the like-minded Nurse With Wound. The duo's first step on the record-producing market were two self-produced samplers (released on their own "Dom"-Label) Ohrensausen and Ohrenschrauben. Featured various artists like P16.D4, Organum, H.N.A.S., and Nurse With Wound.

H.N.A.S. sometimes included Heemann's brother Andreas Martin on guitar and Nicole Schmidt on vocals. This quartet cut several full-length albums, the third of which Im Schatten der Möhre (1987) met with critical acclaim and can be regarded as their major work. Other titles include Melchior – Aufmarsch der Schlampen, Küttel im Frost and Abwassermusik and give proof of an extraordinary sense of humour and a profound knowledge of German underground as they are full of references to major Krautrock electronicisms. Another notable H.N.A.S. album was "The book of Dingenskirchen"—the title being an ironic reference to Psychic TV's 23 live LPs and Germans' pseudo-correct pronunciation of English names by referring to and ridiculing the title of the Deep Purple album "The Book of Taliesyn". It was issued in different record jackets, each designed by H.N.A.S., as were most of the other H.N.A.S. productions. Rumour has it that the "Dead Kennedys'" Jello Biafra desperately sought to get hold of a copy of this extremely limited issue.

In 1993, H.N.A.S. disbanded due to creative differences. Their final album, "Willkür nach Noten", displayed their growing dissent. This became apparent on the previous "Ach dieser Bart" album: Khan and Heemann were each responsible for a side of the LP.

== Mimir, Mirror, In Camera and Current 93 ==
After disbanding both went into different directions. Heemann's new projects included numerous collaborations with Edward Ka-Spel (from The Legendary Pink Dots) with whom he produced "Kata-Climici-China-Doll" and later worked together in the band "Mimir", composed half-and-half of H.N.A.S. and Legendary Pink Dots. He also worked with the German musician/performer Limpe Fuchs, and with the U.S.'s Jim O'Rourke.

Mirror, a duo with established English drone musician Andrew Chalk was a very fruitful collaboration with many releases, often initially appearing in limited, hand-made editions before being reissued in more widely available form. This unit ceased to exist around 2005, although a handful of unreleased recordings are still scheduled to be issued. Heemann has also worked with David Tibet from "Current 93" and was a semi-steady member of that group during the late 1990s.

In Camera, another duo project with Af Ursin's Timo Van Luyck was started in 2004 and has produced four albums so far, the self-titled first album (Some fine legacy), Open Air (Robot), Rumours (DOM BW) and Frampton comes alive (La Scie Doree) presenting yet another facet of Heemann's ideas of textural electroacustica, this time with a focus on improvisation.

== Solo works ==
After the split-up of H.N.A.S., Heemann also became active as a solo-artist: The number of TV appearances (such as in Nancy, France), live-performances in locations such as Austin, Texas, Chicago, Toronto, and Tokyo became more frequent. Solo works include titles such as Invisible Barrier (1992), Aftersolstice (1994), Days of the Eclipse (1996), Magnetic Tape Splicing (1997), "The Rings of Saturn"(2010), the latter being an allusion to the German novel of the same name by W.G. Sebald, one of Heemann's favourite authors.

Heemann also worked as a producer and engineer on albums by artists such as Keiji Haino, Charlemagne Palestine, Organum and Pantaleimon.

As a visual artist Heemann has created album sleeves for Jim O'Rourke, The Teargarden, The Aeolian String Ensemble, Edward Ka-spel and Limpe Fuchs amongst others.

== Discography ==
- Mimir (1990) (as a member of Mimir)
- Invisible Barrier (1993)
- Sleeper Awakes on the Edge of the Abyss (1993) (with Merzbow)
- Aftersolstice (1994)
- Days of the Eclipse (1997)
- Mirror of the Sea (2000) (with Andrew Chalk)
- Motherfuckers Live + Hot Buttered Xhol (2001) (with Xhol Caravan, Current Ninety Three, and Nurse with Wound)
- Time Is the Simplest Thing (2003)
- Untitled (2006) (with Andreas Martin)
- The Rings of Saturn (2008)
- Saiten In Flammen (2009) (with Charlemagne Palestine)
- Painting with Priests (2009) (with Steven Stapleton)
- Bloomington Indiana... Autumn (2010) (with Lee Ranaldo and Jim O'Rourke)
- Plastic Palace People, Vol. 1 (2011) (with Jim O'Rourke)
- Plastic Palace People, Vol. 2 (2011) (with Jim O'Rourke)
- Locrian & Christoph Heemann (2012) (with Locrian)
- Time and Again (2013)
- Five Easy Pieces (With Intermission) (2013)
- Macchia Forest (2013) (with Limpe Fuchs and Timo van Luijk)
- While the City Sleeps (2014) (with Tom Sveta)
- Perception & Association (2015)
- Stürmische Ruhe (2020) (with Brunhild Ferrari)
- End of an Era (2023)
- Project Pope (2023) (with Gerard Herman)
