= Clockcleaner =

American punk band

Clockcleaner was a punk band from Philadelphia, Pennsylvania, United States, named after a particular "hot bag" of heroin that was distributed in Philadelphia in the 1980s. The band consists of John Sharkey III on vocals/guitar, Karen Horner on 6-string bass guitar, and Richie Charles Jr on drums. The trio has drawn comparisons to The Birthday Party, Big Black, Bauhaus, Flipper and even harsh noise band Whitehouse. Their influences have been cited as including Crucifucks, Modern English, Cro-Mags, GG Allin, Neil Young and the first Skrewdriver LP.

Formed in summer 2003, Clockcleaner released an LP called The Hassler on the now defunct Philadelphia label Manic Ride Records. The album echoed early 1990s noise rock, with high pitch guitar sonics and a thumping bass sound. After touring for the EP, original bass guitarist Warren Slegel was fired from the band, and was replaced in the studio by John Sharkey. In early 2006, they released a 7" on Baltimore's Noise/Avant label Hit-Dat Records ("Missing Dick" b/w Crucifucks' cover "By the Door"). Soon to follow was their second LP, released on another Baltimore label, Reptilian Records. The album was called Nevermind (a sarcastic ode to Nirvana's 1991 release). The record was allegedly recorded while Sharkey was under a state of bi-lateral amnesia from a car accident in the summer of 2005. John Sharkey has insisted that the title was a joke to annoy people (he has even gone so far as to call Nirvana "dogshit" in a Dusted magazine interview in 2007):

"People think that record is like the Bible," says Sharkey via phone from his North Philadelphia home. "Fuck that record. It's completely piss-poor. It did not stand the test of time. I can understand the mania that it caused, and I mean, it's good because hair metal sucked, but it almost caused another fuckin' trend that I have no concept of at all – alternative or modern rock. So, Nirvana were dogshit, and I thought it was funny to name our record Nevermind. I kind of wanted people to react like, 'What balls! Who the fuck are these assholes?'"

Nevermind was a departure from the band's punk sound, having more in common with many of the mid-to-late '90s Siltbreeze bands such as Harry Pussy and The Dead C. After the album was recorded Karen Horner became the permanent bassist. Her first show with Clockcleaner was opening for The Melvins. The album did well with many critics and in late 2006 the group signed to Load Records.

In fall 2007, their third full-length release Babylon Rules was issued on the Load label. The record was different from any other release to date in that it channeled a more gothic influence in its sound while still retaining its punk aesthetics. It was widely received by the independent music community as the band toured extensively during fall 2007 in support of Babylon Rules in the US, playing mainly with acts championed by the band, such as Mika Miko, The Lamps and The Homostupids. This record put the band at the forefront of the new wave of hateful noisy music without painting them in the corner of repetition. This was also one of the first major releases to bring skull music to the attention of popular audiences, a genre the band — as well as the Homostupids — has championed since its inception. Both acts have been asked about this 'genre' but have been largely evasive. Sharkey offered in jest that skull music was "the antithetical musical equivalent of coming out of the closet" in many articles published in 2008.

.

== Discography ==
- The Hassler CD/LP (Manic Ride 2004)
- Missing Dick 7" (Hit Dat Records 2006)
- Nevermind CD (Reptilian Records 2006)
- Frogrammer 7" (Richie Records 2007)
- Hands Are For Holding 7" - Fan Club Only - (Hit Dat Records 2007)
- Babylon Rules CD/LP (Load Records 2007)
- Skinheaded Lady 7" - Australia only - (Stained Circles 2008)
- Ready To Fight 12" (Fan Death Records 2009)
- GG Allin 7" (Siltbreeze Records 2009)
- Clockcleaner / Queerhunter Split 7" (HOSS Records 2009)
- Auf Wiedersehen CD/LP (spring 2009)
