= High Bias =

Studio album by Purling Hiss
- Released: October 14, 2016
- Genre: Indie rock
- Length: 39:00
- Label: Drag City

Purling Hiss chronology
Weirdon (2014)	High Bias (2016)

Professional ratings
Aggregate scores
Source	Rating
Metacritic	(72/100)
Review scores
Source	Rating
Allmusic	3.5/5 stars
Pitchfork Media	(6.8/10)
PopMatters	(6/10)
Uncut	3.5/5 stars

High Bias is the sixth studio album by Purling Hiss, released on October 14, 2016, by Drag City.

== Track listing ==
All tracks are written by Mike Polizze.

No.	Title	Length
1.	"Fever"	3:05
2.	"3000 AD"	3:25
3.	"Notion Sickness"	1:21
4.	"Follow You Around"	3:45
5.	"Teddy's Servo Motors"	6:39
6.	"Get Your Way"	3:45
7.	"Pulsations"	3:20
8.	"Ostinato Musik"	2:16
9.	"Everybody in the USA"	11:24

== Personnel ==
Adapted from the High Bias liner notes.

Purling Hiss

- Ben Hart – drums
- Mike Polizze – vocals, electric guitar
- Dan Provenzano – bass guitar

Production and additional personnel

- Paul Gold – mastering
- Kathryn Lipman – photography
- Dallas Simpson – cover art
- Jeff Zeigier – engineering

== Release history ==
Region	Date	Label	Format	Catalog
United States	2016	Drag City	CD, CS, LP	DC652
