= Locrian & Christoph Heemann =

Studio album by Locrian & Christoph Heemann
- Released: September 18, 2012
- Genre: Doom metal; Drone metal
- Length: 51:14
- Label: Handmade Birds

Locrian & Christoph Heemann chronology
Bless Them That Curse You (2012)	Locrian & Christoph Heemann (2012)	Return To Annihilation (2013)

Professional ratings
Review scores
Source	Rating
AllMusic	4/5
Popmatters	favorable
Dusted	favorable
Scenepointblank	8.5/10

Locrian & Christoph Heemann is a collaborative album between drone rock band Locrian and Christoph Heemann. It was released on September 18, 2012 on Handmade Birds.

== Track listing ==
No.	Title	Length
1.	"Hecatomb"	12:24
2.	"Loathe The Light"	11:16
3.	"Edgeless City"	15:10
4.	"The Drowned Forest"	12:24

== Personnel ==
Musicians

- André Foisy – electric guitar, 12-string guitar
- Terence Hannum – vocals, organ, synthesizer, piano
- Steven Hess – drums, tape
- Christoph Heemann – synthesizer, electronics

Production

- Mike Hagler – recording and mixing in Chicago, Illinois
- Greg Norman – recording and mixing in Chicago, Illinois
- Christoph Heemann – recording and mixing in Aachen, Germany
- Jason Ward – mastering
- Terence Hannum – album design
- Sean Dack – artwork
