= Purling Hiss (album) =

Studio album by Purling Hiss
- Released: 2009
- Recorded: Mike Polizze's home studio, Philadelphia, PA
- Genre: Psychedelic rock, noise rock, garage rock
- Length: 39:32
- Label: Permanent (re-issue)

Purling Hiss chronology
Purling Hiss (2009)	Hissteria (2010)

Professional ratings
Review scores
Source	Rating
Pitchfork Media	(8.0/10)

Purling Hiss is the eponymously titled debut studio album of Purling Hiss, released independently in 2009. Permanent Records adopted the album and issued it on vinyl and repressed and re-issued it in 2014. Evan Minsker of Pitchfork Media called the album "a monster of blown-out, shredding, heavy psych music that consistently locks into a satisfying groove."

== Track listing ==
All tracks are written by Mike Polizze.

No.	Title	Length
1.	"White Noise Machine"	1:46
2.	"Almost Washed My Hair"	9:19
3.	"Sound of Montage"	1:31
4.	"Purple Kiss"	14:28
5.	"D.U.I."	1:17
6.	"Montage Mountain"	11:09

== Personnel ==
Adapted from the Purling Hiss liner notes.

- Mike Polizze – vocals, instruments

== Release history ==
Region	Date	Label	Format	Catalog
United States	2009	self-released	CD	
United States	2009	Archive49	CD	OS003
United States	2009	Permanent	LP	PERM-010
United States	2014	Permanent	CS, LP	PERM-010
