= Weirdon =

Studio album by Purling Hiss
- Released: September 23, 2014
- Recorded: February 2014
- Studio: Black Dirt Studio, NYC
- Genre: Indie rock
- Length: 43:48
- Label: Drag City
- Producer: Jason Meagher, Mike Polizze

Purling Hiss chronology
Water on Mars (2013)	Weirdon (2014)	High Bias (2016)

Professional ratings
Aggregate scores
Source	Rating
Metacritic	(76/100)
Review scores
Source	Rating
Allmusic	4/5 stars
Pitchfork Media	(7.5/10)
PopMatters	(7/10)
Rolling Stone	3.5/5 stars
Uncut	3.5/5 stars

Weirdon is the fifth studio album by Purling Hiss, released on September 23, 2014 by Drag City.

== Track listing ==
All tracks are written by Mike Polizze.

No.	Title	Length
1.	"Forcefield of Solitude"	3:41
2.	"Sundance Saloon Boogie"	2:07
3.	"Learning Slowly"	4:58
4.	"Another Silvermoon"	6:03
5.	"Reptil-a-genda"	5:22
6.	"Where's Sweetboy"	2:20
7.	"Aging Faces"	2:51
8.	"I Don't Wanna Be A..."	3:54
9.	"Airwaves"	1:25
10.	"Running Through My Dreams"	3:08
11.	"Six Ways to Sunday"	7:59

== Personnel ==
Adapted from the Weirdon liner notes.

Purling Hiss

- Kiel Everett – bass guitar, acoustic guitar
- Ben Leaphart – drums
- Mike Polizze – vocals, electric guitar, acoustic guitar, bass guitar, drums, percussion, production, cover art

Production and additional personnel

- Jason Killinger – cover art
- Jason Meagher – production, photography
- Roger Seibel – mastering
- Tiffany Yoon – photography

== Release history ==
Region	Date	Label	Format	Catalog
United States	2014	Drag City	CD, CS, LP	DC533
