= Dizzy Polizzy =

Compilation album by Purling Hiss
- Released: 2011
- Recorded: 2004–2009
- Studio: Mike Polizze's home studio, Philadelphia, PA
- Genre: Indie rock, psychedelic rock
- Length: 42:33
- Label: Drag City (re-issue)

Purling Hiss chronology
Lounge Lizards (2011)	Dizzy Polizzy (2011)	Paisley Montage (2011)

Professional ratings
Review scores
Source	Rating
Allmusic	3.5/5 stars
Pitchfork Media	(7.5/10)

Dizzy Polizzy is a compilation album by Purling Hiss, released independently in 2011.

== Track listing ==
All tracks are written by Mike Polizze.

Side one
No.	Title	Length
1.	"She Don't Mind"	3:18
2.	"Icelator"	4:10
3.	"Die High"	3:36
4.	"Sifting Hands"	4:15
5.	"Millions of Colors"	3:48

Side two
No.	Title	Length
1.	"Squeaky Fromme"	4:29
2.	"Preface"	1:42
3.	"Earth Creature"	3:21
4.	"Last Day"	1:38
5.	"Drag On"	5:38
6.	"Headlights"	6:38

== Personnel ==
Adapted from the Dizzy Polizzy liner notes.

- Mike Polizze – vocals, instruments

== Release history ==
Region	Date	Label	Format	Catalog
United States	2011	self-released	CS	
United States	2014	Drag City	CD	DC590
