= Hissteria =

Studio album by Purling Hiss
- Released: September 28, 2010
- Recorded: Mike Polizze's home studio, Philadelphia, PA
- Genre: Psychedelic rock, noise rock, blues rock, hard rock
- Length: 28:34
- Label: Richie

Purling Hiss chronology
Purling Hiss (2009)	Hissteria (2010)	Public Service Announcement (2010)

Hissteria is the second studio album by Purling Hiss, released on September 28, 2010 by Richie Records. The album continued to explore the abrasive guitar noise of the debut across extended tracks.

== Track listing ==
All tracks are written by Mike Polizze.

Side one
No.	Title	Length
1.	"Passenger Queen"	6:37
2.	"Whipple Dam"	3:28

Side two
No.	Title	Length
1.	"Space Roots/Limerence"	6:15
2.	"Down on the Delaware River"	12:08

== Personnel ==
Adapted from the Hissteria liner notes.

- Mike Polizze – vocals, instruments

== Release history ==
Region	Date	Label	Format	Catalog
United States	2010	Richie	LP	RR//TT#27
