= These Are Powers =

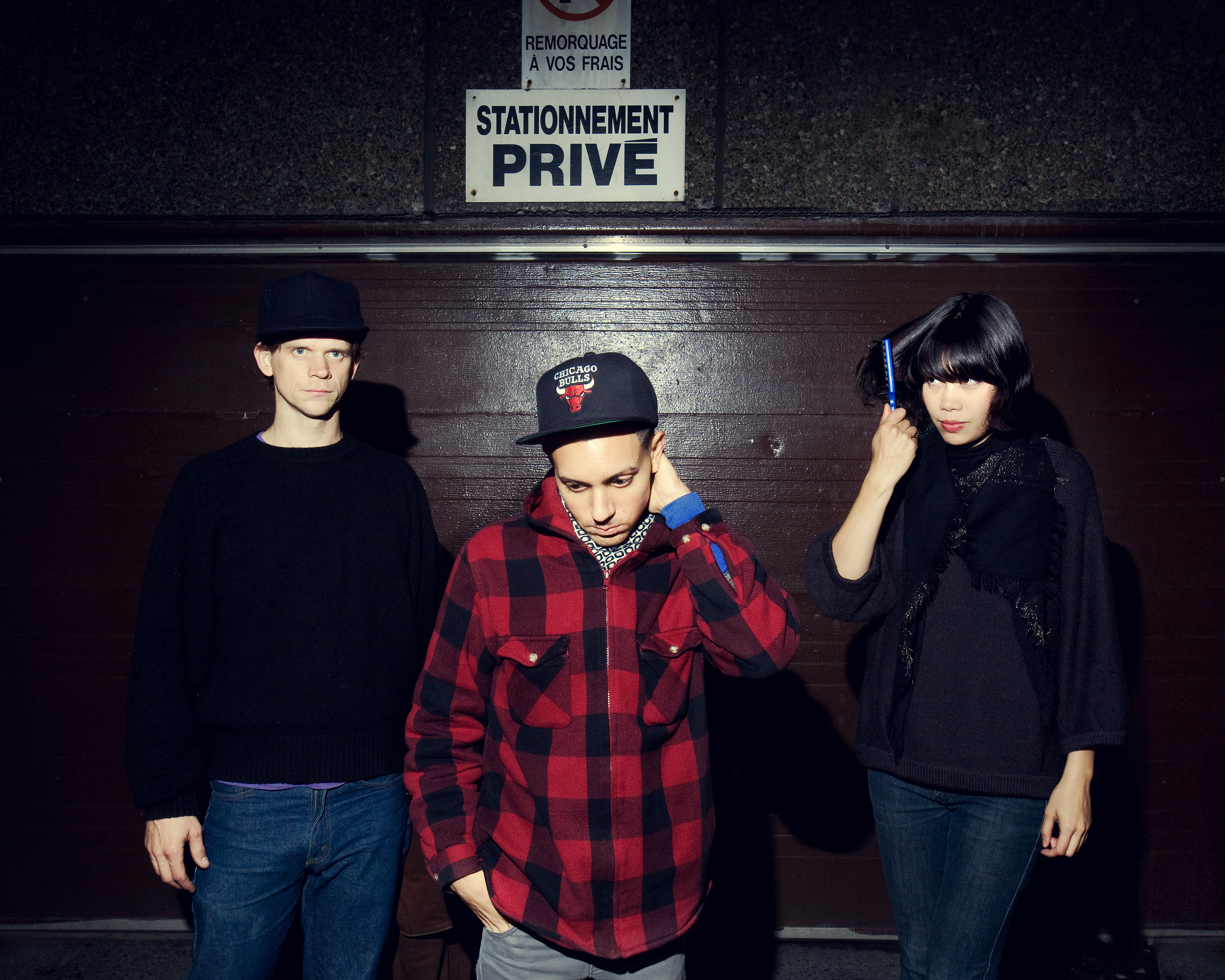
- These Are Powers (l-r: Pat Noecker, Bill Salas, Anna Barie)

Background information
- Genres: Electronic, experimental rock
- Years active: 2006–2011
- Labels: Dead Oceans Records, HOSS Records
- Members: Pat Noecker; Anna Barie; Bill Salas (aka Brenmar)
- Past members: Ted McGrath
- Website: http://www.thesearepowers.com

These Are Powers was an American experimental music group from Brooklyn, New York and Chicago, Illinois, United States. The band mixes polyrhythm with samples and other electronic sounds and noise rock.

== History ==
These Are Powers were an avant-garde, experimental noise dance band from Brooklyn, New York founded by singer and guitarist Anna Barie and bassist Pat Noecker (Liars) in 2006.

=== 2006-2008 ===
With drummer Ted McGrath, These Are Powers recorded the Silver Lung 7" on Elsie and Jack Recordings and Terrific Seasons LP originally released on HOSS Records and later re-released by Dead Oceans. The early recordings were inspired by African polyrhythms, Der Blaue Reiter, John Cage, Alice Coltrane, and Pandit Pran Nath. During this period, the band founded the genre of Ghost Punk and often drew comparisons to arty experimenters Sonic Youth, Throbbing Gristle and This Heat. Live shows were treated as loud, psychedelic exorcisms with long, improvised passages.

=== 2008-2011 ===
Producer Bill Salas (Brenmar) replaced McGrath as drummer for These Are Powers originally on a standing electro-acoustic drum kit before transitioning later into more electronic production. The band wrote their Taro Tarot EP and the All Aboard Future LP in Salas' hometown of Chicago between several American and Canadian DIY tours. Influences at this time were Top 40 American Hip Hop, UK Dubstep, 1990s House music and New Age. These Are Powers increasingly collaborated with other musicians, dancers, visual artists, designers and videographers for their album artwork, performances, costuming, set design, and gallery events, becoming more of a collective than a band.

They gained a reputation worldwide for their high energy live shows, often in unusual venues. TAP performed increasingly in Europe, as well as in museums and galleries. In 2009 they had an artist residency in China and played shows nationwide, organised by Beijing label Maybe Mars and promoters Split Works. Their final release was their CANDYMAN 12 inch on RVNG Intl. The artwork for the album was by Kevin O'Neil and inspired by the fetish of Sploshing.

The band announced in early February, 2011 that they had broken up during a memorial show for late promoter Ariel Panero at Death By Audio.

Noecker played a prepared bass with a wooden dowel put under the strings which functioned as an additional 3rd bridge, shortening the string length to cause an altered musical scale with the fret positions. This would be the precursor to a custom designed bass, called "The Burner Bass" by experimental Dutch luthier Yuri Landman which Noecker now uses in his solo project RAFT.

In 2012, Anna Barie moved to France founded the experimental electronic duo DUBAI with producer and engineer Johannes Buff. Pat Noecker revived his solo project RAFT in late 2011 and Bill Salas continues to DJ and produce as BRENMAR.

== Discography ==
=== Albums ===
- Terrific Seasons (2007) HOSS Records, (re-released 2008) Dead Oceans Records
- Taro Tarot, (2008) HOSS Records, (re-released 2008) Dead Oceans Records
- Taro Tarot (2008) Deleted Art (vinyl release)
- All Aboard Future, (2009) Dead Oceans
- "CANDYMAN 12"3 (2010) RVNG Intl.

=== 7" ===
- Silver Lung b/w Funeral Xylophone (2007) Elsie and Jack Recordings

=== Splits ===
- Cockles 7" w/The Creeping Nobodies (2008) Army of Bad Luck

=== Compilations ===
- Love And Circuits on Cardboard Records (2007)

=== Other ===
- The South Angel Remixes CD-R (2006)
- These Are Powers S/T CD-R and Cassette (2006)
