= Mimir (band) =

Mimir is an experimental band comprising Edward Ka-Spel, Jim O'Rourke, Christoph Heeman, Seeman, and Andreas Martin.

The band's self-titled debut album received a four-star rating from AllMusic.

== Discography ==
- Mimir (1990)

== Members ==
- Edward Ka-Spel
- Christoph Heemann
- Andreas Martin
- Jim O'Rourke
- Seeman
