= Jason Forrest =

American electronic music producer

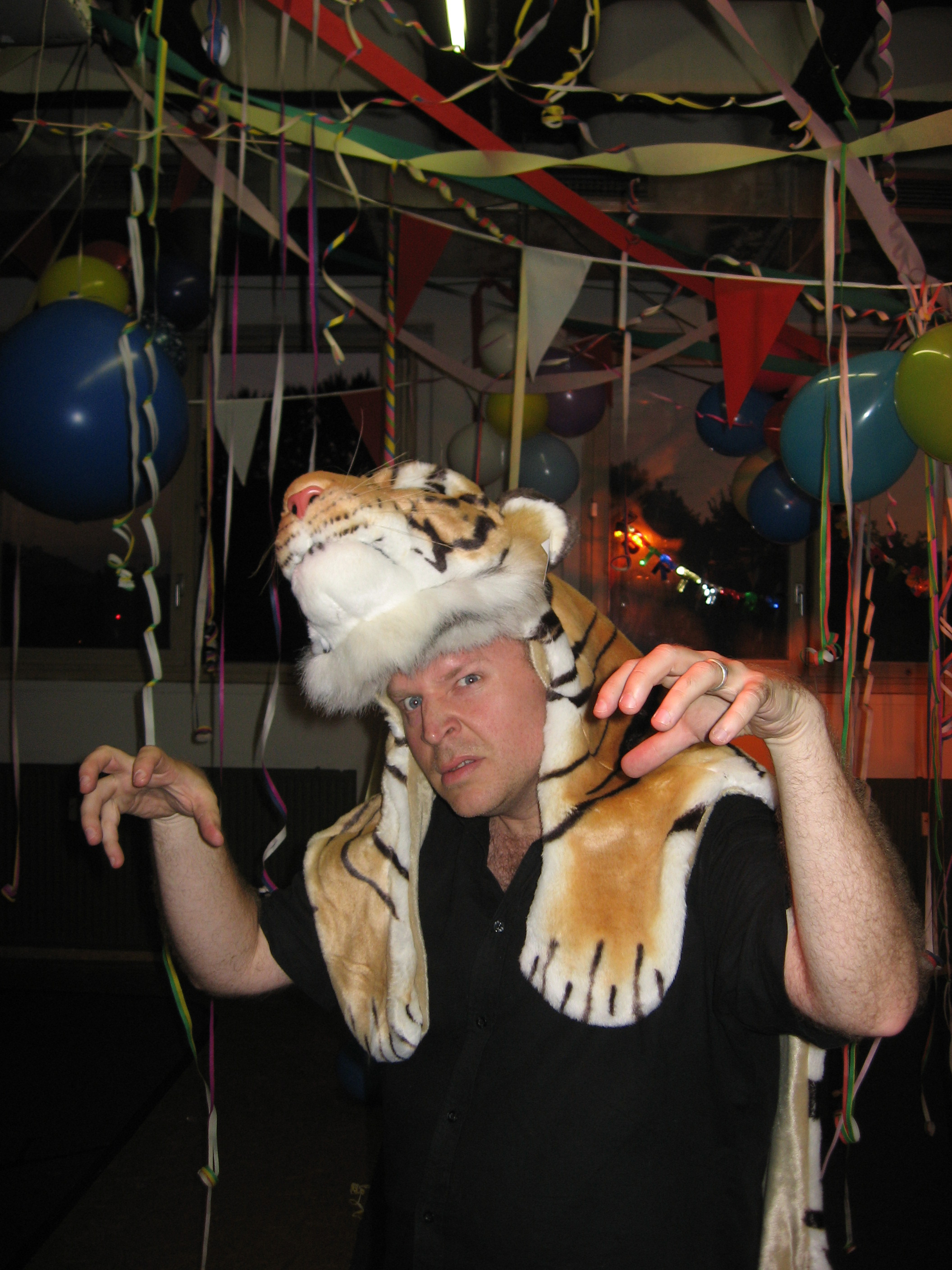
- Jason Forrest preparing for Birthday Party Berlin, August, 2008

Background information
- Also known as: DJ Donna Summer
- Born: 5 April 1972 (age 53); Fort Mill, South Carolina
- Genres: Breakcore
- Occupation: Record producer
- Instrument: Laptop / DJ
- Years active: 2001–present
- Labels: Cock Rock Disco, Irritant, Sonig, Deathbomb Arc, Mewe le Disque, Brooklyn Beats

Jason Forrest is an American electronic music producer known for noisy experimental electronica and breakcore incorporating many ideas of mash-up and rock and roll. Largely produced and performed on a single computer (including live shows), his songs tend to be constructed from digital samples of found sounds and other artists' music. Until 2004 he recorded under the name Donna Summer, an allusion to disco singer Donna Summer.

In 2005 RES magazine named Forrest's "Steppin Off" video, by director Jon Watts, music video of the year. In 2006 Res magazine named Forrest's video War Photographer, directed by Joel Trussell video of the year, and online magazine Pitchfork Media also named it in their top five videos of the year. Both videos have won several awards at various international film and video festivals and have both been widely viewed, downloaded and acclaimed.

Forrest has released on many labels, but primarily on Sonig, the Köln, Germany based record label. He also has releases on Irritant Records (UK), Omeko (JP), MeWe le Disque (BE), Mirex (DE), Brooklyn Beats (USA), and HOSS Records (USA).

Some of the more conspicuous samples of other artists to be found in Forrest's work include ones from Laurie Anderson, The Who, Supertramp, Steely Dan, Joe Jackson, Elton John, Creedence Clearwater Revival and Pat Benatar. This (along with his former stage name) shows his interest in appropriation as an artistic concept. Along with many images featured on the Cock Rock Disco web site it also shows his interest in recontextualizing popular culture from past decades.

Forrest grew up in South Carolina, has lived in Atlanta and New York City and now (Winter, 2009) resides in Berlin. He has a BA in Photography. He previously worked as a professional artist as well as an art critic for the Atlanta Journal-Constitution news paper.

Besides being a fan himself, there is no connection between Forrest and the pop music/disco artist, Donna Summer. In a 2003 interview with the CBC Radio program, Brave New Waves, he stated that by being a middle class white male using this name he was "subjecting people to a fake issue of diversity" and forcing them "to consider gender a little bit more".

== Cock Rock Disco ==
He created the record label Cock Rock Disco to release his own recordings in 2000, while living in New York City. For three years he self-released his earliest albums on CD-R, including "Rock Non Rock" and "Belligerent Super Vision", his first unreleased full-length. Then in 2005, Cock Rock Disco began releasing other artists including Duran Duran Duran, Drumcorps, Otto von Schirach, About, the Assdroids and Dev/Null. The label has currently (as of Nov 2009) 18 full-length releases, 15 12"-only releases and continues to release bi-monthly free MP3 only albums, of which there are currently 19 and growing fast.

A free full-length Mp3 album was made available in Dec, 2005 and remains online and free to download. To date it has been downloaded over 70,000+ times. In April 2009 a new free compilation "Monsters of Cock Rock Disco" was released and features newcomers to the label Captain Ahab in addition to their normal roster of artists.

To celebrate release of the "Monsters of CRD" the label hosted a tour of central Europe with Otto von Schirach, Duran Duran Duran, Nero's Day at Disneyland, and Forrest, as DJ Donna Summer. The tour lasted 2 weeks and stopped at 10 cities. There was a limited edition poster accompanying the tour that was sold out.

Forrest also designs most of the visuals for Cock Rock Disco including the website, many of the album covers, and any social media presence.

In 2015, Cock Rock Disco was re-launched with many of the label's previous releases becoming available as free mp3 downloads and continuing to release new music and videos.

== Nightshifters ==
In 2008, Forrest began a new label that focused exclusively on club-friendly music called Nightshifters together with New York City Dj Jubilee. The label works mainly with a small group of musicians including AC Slater, Hostage, Rob Threezy, Proper Villains, Jubilee, Rampage, and Forrest himself as Dj Donna Summer.

The label releases "EP" length releases of usually 4 original tracks and 2-4 remixes per release. To date (Nov 2009) the label has released 9 mp3-only releases, 3 Dj mixes, and a T-shirt. Remixers have included Jokers Of The Scene, Mikix the Cat, Angel Alanis, Scott Cooper, Luna-C, Grahmzilla, DreSkull, and Blatta & Inesha.

Forrest currently makes all of the design work for Nightshifters.

== Advanced D&D ==
Forrest was also the host of "Advanced D&D With Donna Summer" on independent freeform radio station WFMU, where he continued to use the name Donna Summer after dropping it in relation to his own recordings. The show is archived on the WFMU website.

Forrest says, "The show was primarily focused on unreleased new musicians. I tried to play as much CDR stuff as possible, and figure about 80% of each show was completely unreleased." On his own web-forum he has maintained that he would like to continue with the show again in the future.

== Network Awesome ==
Network Awesome was an online TV broadcasting outlet launched by electronic musician Jason Forrest and co-founder Greg Sadetsky on January 1, 2011.

Network Awesome also included a magazine with the goal of providing commentary and analysis of the featured content via daily articles. The magazine was syndicated by Huffington Post and DigBoston. As of November 25, 2020 the site is offline.

== Wasted Festival ==
In 2005, Forrest co-founded the Wasted Festival to showcase breakcore musicians and related acts. The mini-festival began in co-operation with Club Transmediale, and ran at least ten events.

== Discography ==
=== Albums ===
- Popxplosion (2002, Broklyn Beats)
- To All Methods Which Calculate Power (2002, Omeko)
- Fluxus, Inc. (2003, Tonschacht)
- This Needs To Be Your Style (2003, Irritant)
- Death After Life (2003, Cock Rock Disco)
- Blood Tax at Harvest Time/Shots: Vol. One (2004, split 12" EP with Ricky Rabbit, HOSS Records)
- The Unrelenting Songs of the 1979 Post Disco Crash (2004, Sonig)
- Ladies Get In Free!!! (2004, Brooklyn Beats)
- Mastodon Razor (2004, Lund Records)
- Lady Fantasy EP (2005, Sonig)
- Shamelessly Exciting (2005, Sonig)
- "Utopia" (2010, Deathbomb Arc)
- The Everything (2011, Staatsakt)

=== Compilation albums ===
- 2006 - Silver Monk Time: A Tribute to the Monks (29 bands cover the Monks)
- 2007 - Monks Demo Tapes 1965 (remix by Forrest)

== Interviews ==
- Radio Feature, The Some Assembly Required Interview with Jason Forrest
