= Locrian (band) =

American experimental music/drone rock band

- Origin: Chicago, Illinois, U.S.
- Genres: Doom metal; drone; noise; black metal; ambient; electronic
- Years active: 2005–present
- Labels: Relapse, Profound Lore
- Members: André Foisy; Terence Hannum; Steven Hess

Locrian is an experimental music/drone rock band which formed in Chicago, Illinois, United States in late 2005 and is currently based in Chicago and Baltimore, Maryland. The band features Terence Hannum (synthesizers, vocals, tape loops), Steven Hess (drums, electronics), and André Foisy (electric, 12-string, acoustic guitars, tape loops, and electronics). The group incorporates influences from multiple genres including ambient, black metal, noise, drone, industrial, and electronics, and cite One Eyed God Prophecy, Uranus, Yes, Genesis, Brian Eno, and Robert Fripp as influences. Locrian lyrics and artwork evoke dystopic and apocalyptic imagery. To date, Locrian have released eight studio albums, three collaborative albums, and numerous limited edition releases.

== History ==
Locrian was formed in late 2005 by André Foisy and Terence Hannum, who had previously played together in Unlucky Atlas. Foisy is originally from Northern New York, while Hannum is from Florida. The group has released over 20 recordings in their relatively short lifespan, on labels such as Small Doses, Bloodlust!, and At War With False Noise, as well as on the group's private label Land of Decay.

In 2009, the band released their first studio album, Drenched Lands. The album was met with acclaim from the Chicago Tribune, the Chicago Reader, and Rock-A-Rolla magazine. Locrian followed its release with a U.S. tour, including a special Pitchfork Media sponsored 'Show No Mercy' show in New York City, NY. Their 2009 Rain of Ashes release features two 30-minute-long tracks recorded live at the University of Maryland's radio station WMUC. A second album, Territories, was released in 2010, which took the band in a more rock-oriented direction, featuring guest appearances from members of Nachtmystium, Bloodyminded, Yakuza, and Velnias, and this was followed by a third, The Crystal World, later the same year, the title coming from a J. G. Ballard novel.

In 2010, drummer Steven Hess joined the group as a permanent member. The group's first recording with Hess was The Crystal World.

Locrian provided the soundtrack to Scott Treleaven's film piece The Last 7 Words featuring Genesis P-Orridge.

In addition to playing in the band, Terence Hannum is an installation artist who exhibited at the Museum of Contemporary Art, Chicago in 2007, and at the Peeler Art Center in 2010. Hannum and Foisy formerly taught at Columbia College Chicago. Currently, Hannum teaches at Stevenson University.

The band was signed to Relapse Records in 2012. In 2013 the group released Return to Annihilation, followed in 2015 by Infinite Dissolution.

Following a seven-year break in recordings, Locrian released the New Catastrophism album and Ghost Frontiers EP simultaneously on August 12, 2022, through Profound Lore Records. This was followed in December 2023 by a Bandcamp EP consisting of a cover of Coil's Solar Lodge and three remixes.

Locrian released its eighth studio album, End Terrain, on April 5, 2024, via Profound Lore. The band have described the album as "a concept album exposing a vision of a future Earth consumed by waste."

== Musical style ==
The band's music was described by Allmusic as an "eclectic mixture of black metal, electronics, drone, and noise rock". Allmusic writer Ned Raggett also identified progressive rock influences on The Crystal World. The band have identified krautrock and 1990s death metal as influences.

== Members ==
- André Foisy – guitar, bass, percussion
- Terence Hannum – vocals, synthesizers, organs, tapes, guitar
- Steven Hess – drums, percussion, electronics

== Discography ==
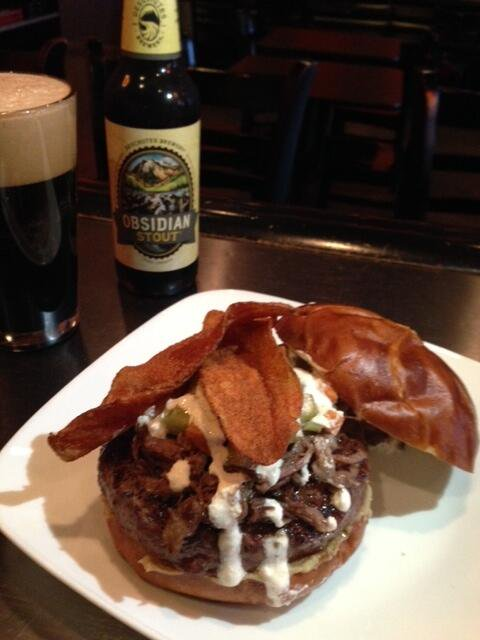
Kuma's Too, a heavy metal-themed restaurant in Chicago, named their December 2013 special after Locrian.

=== Studio albums ===
- Drenched Lands (2009, At War With False Noise / Small Doses / BloodLust!)
- Territories (2010, At War With False Noise / Basses Frequences / BloodLust! / Small Doses)
- The Crystal World (2010, Utech Records)
- The Clearing (2011, Utech Records)
- Return to Annihilation (2013, Relapse Records)
- Infinite Dissolution (2015, Relapse Records)
- New Catastrophism (2022, Profound Lore Records)
- End Terrain (2024, Profound Lore Records)

=== Collaboration albums ===
- New Dominions with Horseback (2011, Utech Records)
- Bless Them That Curse You with Mamiffer (2012, Utech Records / Sige / Profound Lore Records)
- Locrian & Christoph Heemann with Christoph Heemann (2012, Handmade Birds)

=== EPs ===
- Exhuming the Carnival / Burying the Carnival (2008, self-released)
- Visible / Invisible (2009, Small Doses)
- Endless Plains / Flat Horizon (2009, Pleasant Magik)
- Falling Towers / After The Torchlight (2010, Black Horizons)
- Violitionist Sessions (2013, Violitionist Sessions)
- Ghost Frontiers (2022, Profound Lore Records)
- Solar Lodge (2023, Anathemata Editions)

=== Singles ===
- "Plague Journal" (2008, BloodLust!)
- "Dort Ist Der Weg" (2011, Flingco Sound System)

=== Live albums ===
- Setting Yr. Jetta on Fire (2005, self-released)
- II (2006, self-released)
- III (2006, self-released)
- Greyfield Shrines (2008, Diophantine Discs)
- Rhetoric of Surfaces (2008, BloodLust!)
- Ruins of Morning (Plague Journal) (2008, Crank Satori)
- Rain of Ashes (2009, Fan Death Records)

=== Split releases ===
- Locrian / Daleth with Daleth (2007, self-released)
- Colossus / Locrian with Colossus (2008, Heavy Nature Tapes)
- Locrian / Katchmare with Katchmare (2009, Pilgrim Talk)
- Locrian / Harpoon with Harpoon (2009, Hewhocorrupts Inc.)
- Dissolvers with Century Plants (2010, Tape Drift Records)
- Horseback / Locrian with Horseback (2011, Turgid Animal)

=== Compilations ===
- Locrian (2007, self-released) – includes Setting Yr. Jetta on Fire, II, III
- Archive 01: Endless Plains Flat Horizon (2022, self-released) – remaster of Endless Plains / Flat Horizon EP
- Archive 02: Plague Journal (2022, self-released) – remaster of "Plague Journal" single plus Ruins of the Morning (Plague Journal) live recording
- Archive 03: Visible Invisible (2022, self-released) – remaster of Visible Invisible EP plus live version of "Visible Invisible" from Colossus / Locrian
