= Crystal Ball (band) =

Swiss rock band

Wuppertal, 2016.

Hamburg, 2018.

Crystal Ball is a Swiss hard rock band. They have released thirteen albums.

== Discography ==
- In the Beginning (1999, Point Music Distribution)
- Hard Impact (2000, Point Music Distribution)
- Virtual Empire (2002, Nuclear Blast Records)
- Hellvetia (2003, Nuclear Blast Records)
- Time Walker (2005, Nuclear Blast Records)
- Secrets (2007, AFM Records)
- Dawnbreaker (2013, Massacre Records)
- Liferider (2015, Massacre Records)
- Déjà-Voodoo (2016, Massacre Records)
- Crystallizer (2018, Massacre Records)
- 2020 (2019, Massacre Records)
- Crysteria (2022, Massacre Records)
- Reset (2026, Massacre Records)
