= Mainz Microtron =

Particle physics facility

Coordinates: 49°59′30″N 8°14′11″E

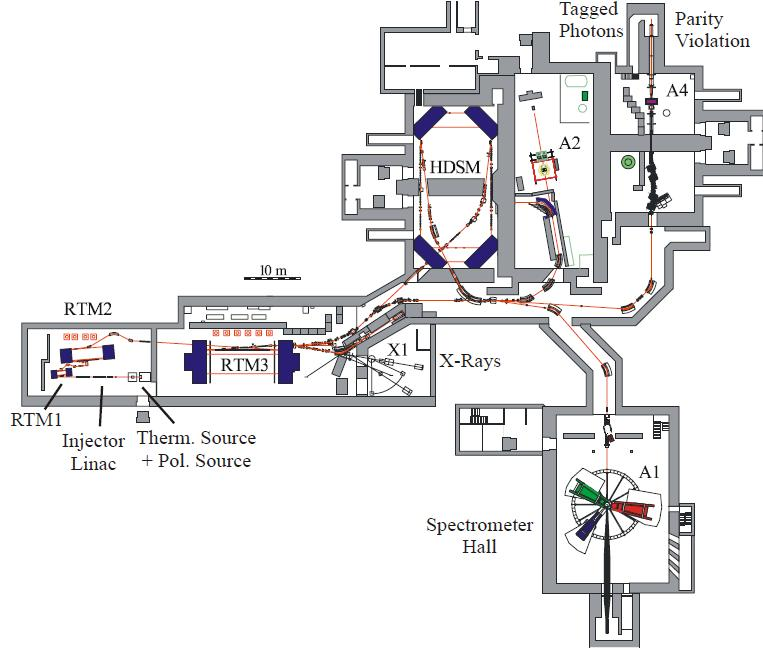
Floorplan of the MAMI facility

The Mainz Microtron (German name: Mainzer Mikrotron), abbreviated MAMI, is a microtron (particle accelerator) which provides a continuous wave, high intensity, polarized electron beam with an energy up to 1.6 GeV.

MAMI is the core of an experimental facility for particle, nuclear and X-ray radiation physics at the Johannes Gutenberg University in Mainz (Germany). It is one of the largest campus-based accelerator facilities for basic research in Europe. The experiments at MAMI are performed by about 200 physicists of many countries organized in international collaborations.

== Research goals ==
The scientific research at MAMI focusses on the investigation of the structure and dynamics of hadrons, particles consisting of quarks and gluons bound by the strong force. The most important hadrons are protons and neutrons, the basic constituents of atomic nuclei and, therefore, the building blocks of ordinary matter. Electrons and photons interact with the electric charges and the magnetization of quarks inside a hadron in a relatively weak and well understood way providing undistorted information about basic hadronic properties like (transverse) size, magnetic moments, distribution of charge and magnetism, flavor structure, polarizabilities and excitation spectrum. At MAMI the full potential of electroweak probes is explored in an energy region characteristic for the first hadronic excitations and with a spatial resolution in the order of the typical hadron size of about 1 fm.

== The MAMI accelerator ==
The MAMI accelerator consists of four cascaded microtrons, an injector linac, a thermal source for unpolarized electrons and a laser-driven source for electrons with 80% spin polarization. The operation principle is based on the continuous wave (cw) microtron technique. There the beam is recirculated many times through a normal-conduction linear accelerating structure with a moderate energy gain per turn. Due to constant, homogeneous magnetic bending fields the length of the beam path is increasing with energy after each turn. The magnetic fields, the radio-frequency (rf) used to accelerate the electrons and the energy gain per turn have to be adjusted to meet the microtron coherence condition, i.e. the condition that the length of each path is an integer factor of the rf wavelength. This microtron scheme makes efficient use of the rf power and the inherent strong longitudinal phase focussing guarantees excellent beam quality and stability.

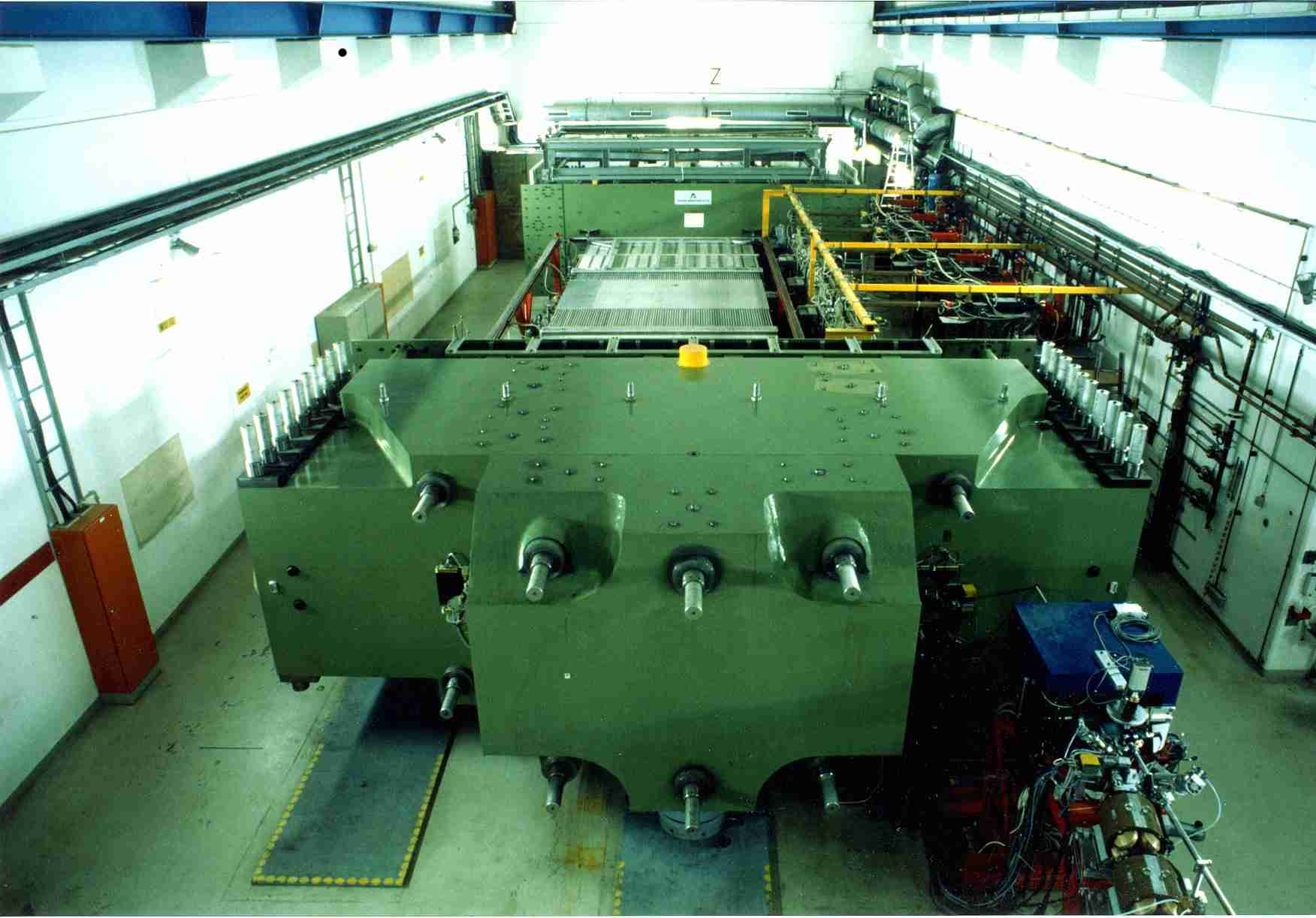
MAMI-B: The individual return paths are located on the left-hand side between the two huge 180° bending magnets. The acceleration section is on the right-hand side.

In each of the first 3 stages the recirculation is archived by two homogeneous 180° bending magnets. The electron tracks are reminiscent of the race track of an antique arena which is the origin for the name "race-track-microtron (RTM)". The third stage, MAMI-B, started operation in 1990 and delivered a beam for experiments with energies up to 882 MeV and 100 $\mu$A cw for more than 97800 h until the end of 2007. The quality of the beam is very high: an energy spread of 30 keV and an emittance of 25 nm*rad is achieved routinely. The bending magnets of MAMI-B are approximately 5 m wide and weigh 450 t. At this point the mechanical limit of the RTM concept has been reached, leaving MAMI-B to be the biggest microtron in the world.

At the end of the 1990s, the demand for an energy increase up to about 1500 MeV arose. This was accomplished by adding a fourth accelerator stage. Adding another RTM was not possible because it would have required bending magnets of ~2200 tons each. Therefore, the technique was modified by splitting the 180°-dipoles into a system of symmetric pairs of 90°-dipoles, each forming an achromatic 180° bending system with magnets of only 250 tons each. To compensate for the strong vertical defocusing due to the 45° pole-face inclination between the magnets, these dipoles incorporate an appropriate field gradient normal to this pole edge. In this scheme there are two non-dispersive sections which allow to install two linear accelerators. To meet the microtron coherence condition within the confined space of existing experimental areas the acceleration frequency of one of these linacs is twice the MAMI-B frequency of 2.45 GHz. The other linac still operates at 2.45 GHz for enhanced longitudinal stability. This special rf scheme gave rise to the name Harmonic Double-Sided Microtron (HDSM). MAMI-C is the worldwide first accelerator using this concept (Kaiser, K.H. et al., 2000).

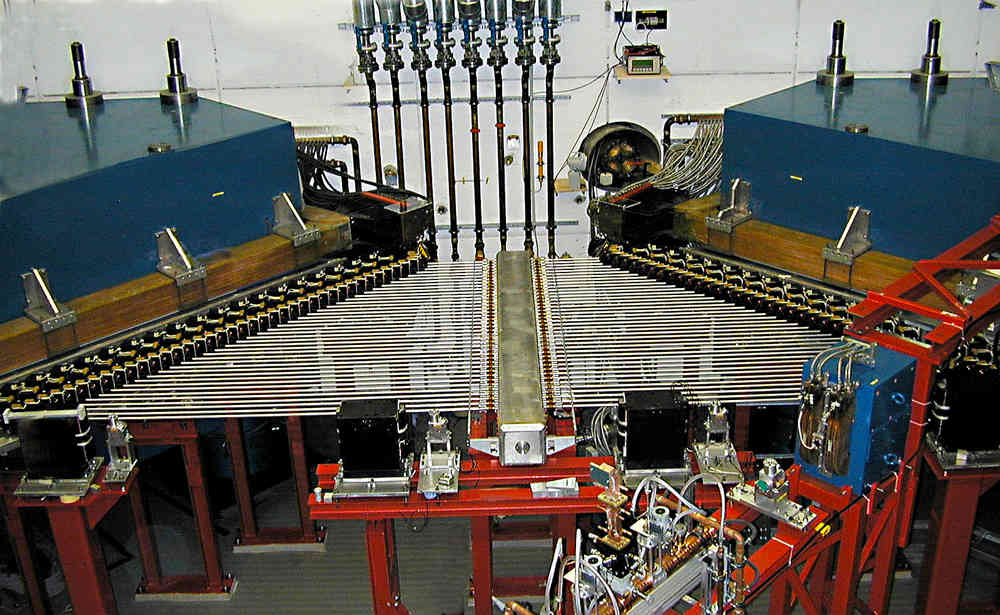
MAMI-C: two of the four 90° end-magnets of the HDSM with the 43 individual recirculation paths in between.

The construction work started in 2000. End of December 2006, within one day, the first test beam was guided through all 43 recirculations and reached the design energy of 1508 MeV. After only a few weeks of beam tests, the first nuclear physics experiment was conducted in February 2007. About 50% of the MAMI beam time in 2007 (7180 h) was used for 1.5 GeV operation. All design parameters of the HDSM, including the max. current of 100 μA (151 kW of beam power), have been verified. End of 2009 an energy of 1604 MeV was reached. The mean availability of the beam for experiments (> 80%) is at a very high level, a clear demonstration that the HDSM scheme is as reliable and stable as the RTM cascade.

== Experimental facilities ==
=== High-resolution electron scattering ===
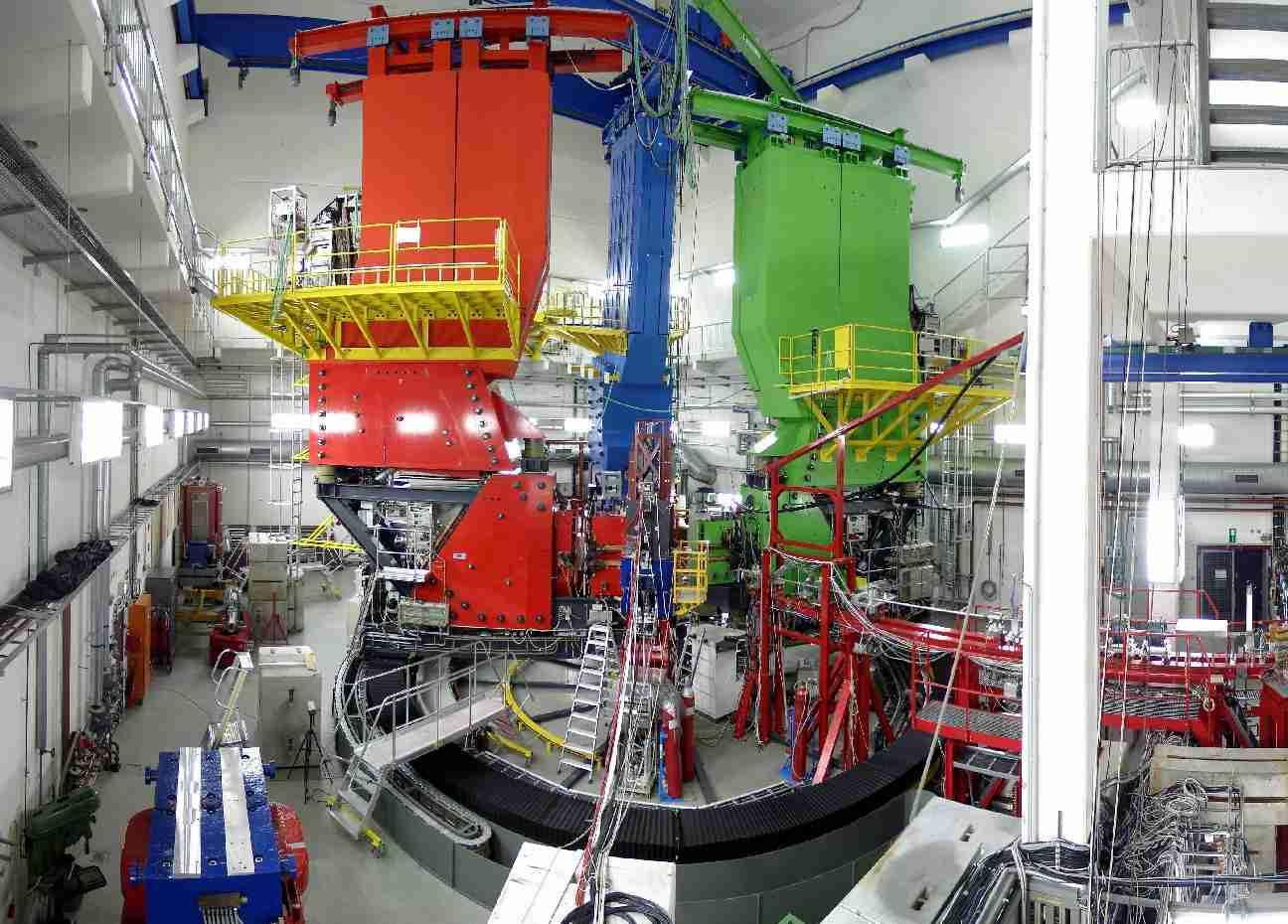
The spectrometer setup of the A1 Collaboration at MAMI is used for high-resolution electron scattering in coincidence with hadrons.

The largest experimental hall of the MAMI accelerator complex houses three high-resolution, focussing magnetic spectrometers operated by the A1 Collaboration. The high momentum resolution ($\Delta$p/p < $10^{-4}$) together with the large acceptance in solid angle (up to 28 msr) and in momentum (up to 25%) makes this setup ideal for electron scattering in coincidence with hadron detection. One of the spectrometers can be tilted up to an out-of-plane angle of 10°, allowing for out-of-plane kinematics. A proton recoil polarimeter gives, in combination with the polarized MAMI beam and a polarized helium-3 gas target, access to a broad variety of spin observables. A fourth spectrometer (KAOS/A1), covering high momenta with a moderate path length for the detection of kaons, is currently in the commissioning phase. The main physics goals are:

- Form factors in elastic electron scattering belong to the most fundamental observables characteristic for nuclear and sub-nuclear systems. They are directly related to transverse spatial densities of charge and magnetization. At MAMI elastic electron-nucleon scattering is studied at small momentum transfer Q² < 2 GeV²/c² with a very high precision.
- In radiative inelastic electron scattering, where an additional low energy photon is emitted (virtual Compton-scattering), the response of nucleons to quasi-static electromagnetic fields can be studied. This response is described in terms of polarizabilities and their spatial distribution.
- Inelastic electron scattering in coincidence with mesons (pions, etas, kaons) provides information about the excitation spectrum of protons and neutrons. Form factors for the transition of a nucleon to specific excited states can be studied with high precision.
- The structure and the wave functions of nuclei and hypernuclei, where one proton or neutron has been replaced by a heavier lambda or sigma baryon, are studied in electron scattering off nuclei in coincidence with knocked-out nucleons or produced mesons.

=== Photoabsorption experiments ===
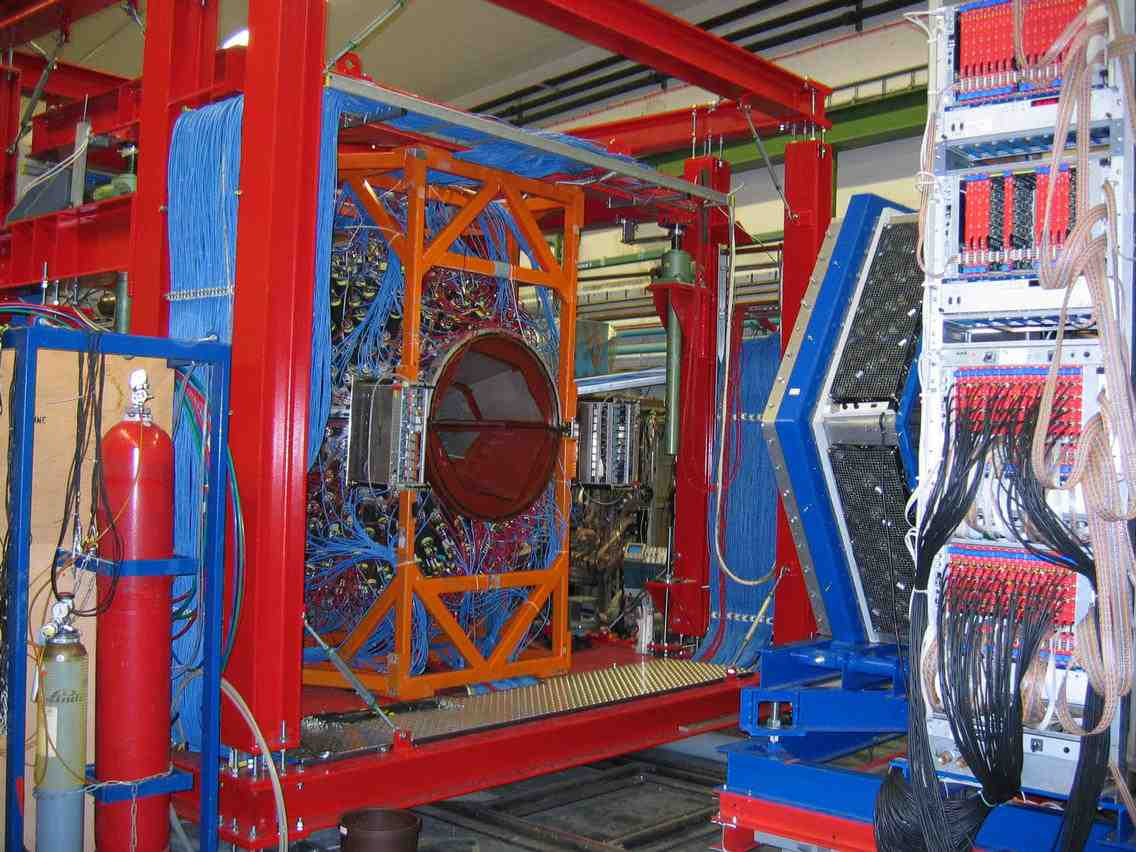
The Crystal Ball/TAPS calorimeter

The A2 Collaboration studies reactions induced by high-energy photons incident on nucleons or nuclei. A beam of photons with known energy and flux is produced via bremsstrahlung using a dedicated tagging spectrometer provided by the University of Glasgow. A polarized electron beam produces circularly polarized photons. Linearly polarized photons can be obtained from coherent bremsstrahlung in an oriented crystal radiator. The central part of the detector system is a hermetic calorimeter consisting of the Crystal Ball detector (672 NaI crystals) in combination with the TAPS detector (384 BaF_{2} crystals) in forward direction. For charged-particle tracking and identification two layers of coaxial multi-wire proportional chambers and a barrel of 24 scintillation counters surrounding the target are installed inside the cavity of the Crystal Ball sphere. A frozen-spin target for polarized protons and deuterons is of particular importance for studying spin degrees of freedom.

The main physics goals are:

- Protons and neutrons are excited when they absorb a photon. If the photon energy is sufficiently high, mesons are emitted. The probabilities for such meson production reactions as well as their angular and spin dependence incorporate indispensable information about nucleon excited states and meson-nucleon dynamics.
- Electric and magnetic polarizabilities are well known concepts in classical physics, which describe the influence of static electric and magnetic fields on composite systems. In case of protons and neutrons scalar and spin-dependent polarizabilities can be measured in low energy Compton scattering.
- At MAMI $\eta$ and $\eta'$ mesons are photoproduced with high rate. With the Crystal Ball detector, decay modes of these mesons can be studied in an almost background-free environment.
- The charge distributions inside nuclei has been measured with high accuracy in electron scattering experiments. Information about the matter distribution can be obtained from the coherent photoinduced production of pions from nuclei, where photon and pion interact coherently with all protons and neutrons inside a nucleus.

A publication database can be found here.

=== Single spin asymmetries in elastic electron scattering ===
The A4 Collaboration measures small asymmetries in the cross-section of elastic scattering of polarized electrons off an unpolarized target, basically hydrogen or deuterium. The momentum transfers achieved either in forward angle- or backward angle-configuration of the detector vary between 0.1 GeV²/c² and 0.6 GeV²/c². A high-power liquid hydrogen target of 10 cm or 20 cm length and a polarized electron beam of I = 20 μA lead to luminosities in the order of $L = 10^{38}~\rm cm^2/s\ .$ The scattered electrons are measured by a total absorbing, segmented lead fluoride calorimeter, which deals with event rates of about 100 MHz. The degree of polarization of the electron beam is measured by a laser Compton backscatter polarimeter simultaneously with to the main experiment.

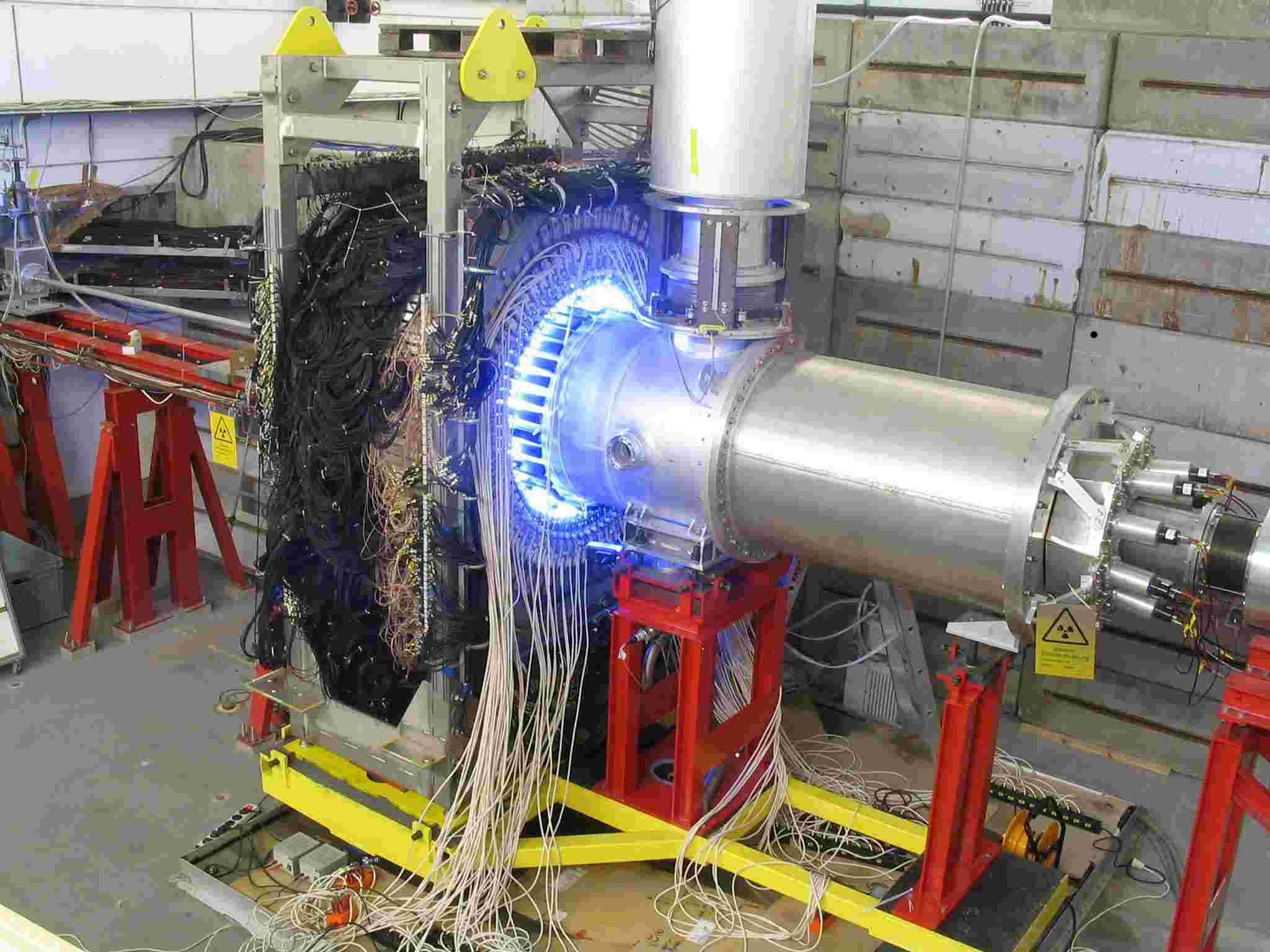
View of the A4 lead fluoride calorimeter and the high-power liquid hydrogen target

There are two main physics goals:

- Parity violating electron scattering asymmetries are measured with a longitudinally polarized electron beam. Using input from the Standard Model of Particle Physics, the contribution of strange sea-quarks to the electric and magnetic form factors of the nucleon are determined.
- Using a transversely polarized electron beam, the observed asymmetries arise at leading order from the interference of the one- and the two-photon-exchange amplitude. These asymmetries are sensitive to excited intermediate states of the nucleon. The imaginary part of the two-photon exchange amplitude can be determined.

A list of publications can be found here here.

=== Brilliant X-ray radiation ===
The X1 Collaboration at MAMI develops brilliant novel radiation sources and explores their potential for applications. The electromagnetic spectrum extends from the far-infrared into the hard X-ray range. "Brilliant" means that a large number of photons is emitted as a sharp bundle from a small spot. At MAMI, beam spots with a diameter down to the sub-micron range are possible. The production mechanisms which have been explored include Smith-Purcell radiation in the infrared and optical spectral range, undulator radiation in the soft X-ray range as well as channeling radiation, parametric X-radiation and transition radiation in the hard X-ray range. A list of publications can be found here.
