= Bloodyminded =

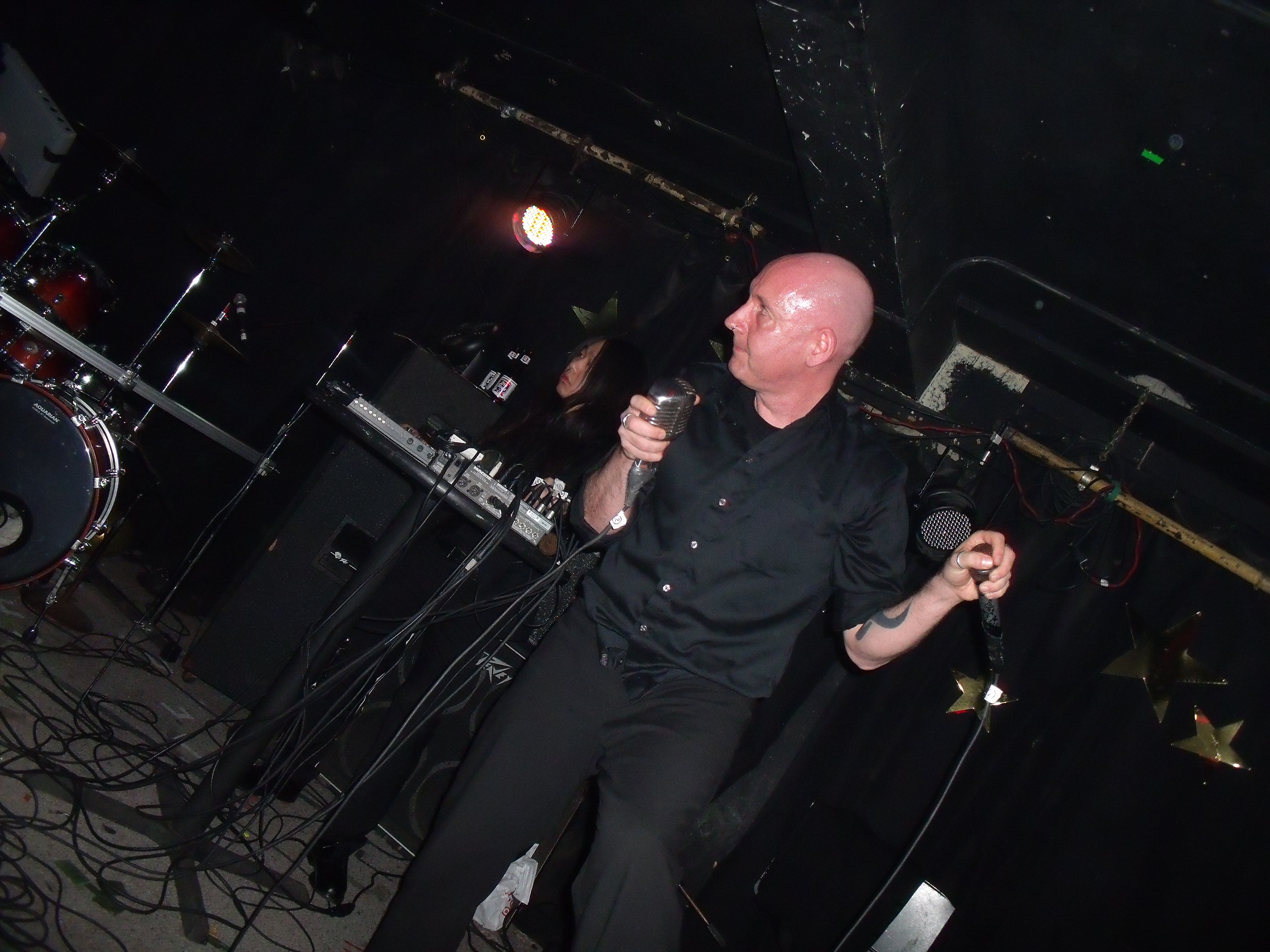
- Bloodyminded in 2009

Background information
- Origin: New York, New York, U.S.
- Genres: Power electronics; industrial; noise
- Years active: 1995–present
- Labels: BloodLust!
- Members: Mark Solotroff; Pieter Schoolwerth; Xavier Laradji; James Moy; Isidro Reyes; Will Lindsay
- Past members: Megan Emish; Ed Knigge; Angel Ramos; Nicole Chambers
- Website: bloodyminded.bandcamp.com

Bloodyminded is an American industrial music band based in Chicago, Illinois. Formed in 1995, the band is led by vocalist and instrumentalist Mark Solotroff, who is its sole consistent member. The band is known for its abrasive sound, confrontational live performances, as well as provocative and transgressive lyrics.

== History ==
Bloodyminded was formed by Mark Solotroff and Megan Emish in New York City in 1995, following the demise of the former's band, Intrinsic Action. The band soon relocated to Chicago. During its history, Bloodyminded has featured a revolving cast of collaborators, including Xavier Laradji, Wierd Records founder Pieter Schoolwerth and vocalist Isidro Reyes, Will Lindsay of Nachtmystium and Wolves in the Throne Room was recruited into the band in 2013. The band also runs their own imprint, BloodLust!

In 2005 and 2006, the band released the records Gift Givers and Magnetism, respectively; Solotroff has described the latter as his most personal work. Gift Givers has featured vocal contributions from Mike IX Williams of Eyehategod, while Magnetism featured lyrics in English and Spanish, co-written by Reyes. Magnetism was followed by 2013's Within the Walls, which Grayson Currin of Pitchfork described as "a series of harrowing drones, feedback bursts, mutated screams, static blitzes, and circuit collapses." Bloodyminded's 2019's self-titled record was considered by Solotroff as the "definitive work of their quarter century of existence."

== Discography ==
Studio albums

- Trophy (1995)
- True Crime (2002)
- Gift Givers (2005)
- Magnetism (2006)
- Within the Walls (2013)
- Bloodyminded (2019)

EPs

- West (1996)
- Live: Behind the Green Door (2005)
- Phases: One (2006)
- Bloodyminded (2006)
- Phases: Two (2007)
- Boston 2008 (2009)
- Phases: Three (2009)
- Boston 2009 (2010)
- The Struggle of Togetherness (2016)
- No Fun Fest 2005 (2018)
- No Fun Fest 2006 (2018)

Singles

- "Mothercare" (2003)
- Live: "Behind The Green Door" / "Street Level At VG Kids" (2006)
- "Phases: Four" (2012)
- "Essential Humanity" (2019)
- "Bloodyminded" (2019)
