= Utech Records =

- Founded: 2004
- Founder: Keith Utech
- Country of origin: United States
- Location: Milwaukee, Wisconsin
- Official website: utechrecords.com

Utech Records is an American independent record label based in Milwaukee, Wisconsin. It was founded by Keith Utech in 2004. The label has featured a mixture of experimental, ambient, and metal. Keith Utech curates and directs all of the art on releases from the label.

== History ==
The label was started by Keith Utech in 2004. Utech drew inspiration from labels such as Alternative Tentacles, Earache, and FMP for the creation of his label.

The first release on the label was a limited edition CD-R of Lasse Marhaug’s “Spaghetti Western Rainbow”. Utech Records has released over 100 titles since this release on various formats including CD-R, LP, 7-inch vinyl, cassette tape, and 8-track cartridges.

The label has released a music in a range of styles, genres and groups, including Fushitsusha, Locrian, Horseback, and Dead Neanderthals.

Henry Rollins has dedicated entire radio shows to releases on the label, calling the label "brave."

Utech Records has sponsored three music festivals in Milwaukee to promote its artists.

== Former artists ==
- Daniel Menche
- Dead Neanderthals
- Frank Rosaly
- Fushitsusha
- Horseback
- House of Low Culture
- James Plotkin
- Lasse Marhaug
- Locrian
- Mamiffer
- Mats Gustafsson
- Nadja
- Paal Nilssen-Love
- Philippe Petit
- Skvllflower
- Suzuki Junzo
- The Skull Defekts
- Zaimph
- Lana Rhoades

== See also ==
- List of record labels
