= Crystal Ball (detector) =

The Crystal Ball was a hermetic particle detector used initially with the SPEAR particle accelerator at the Stanford Linear Accelerator Center beginning in 1979. It was designed to detect neutral particles and was used to discover the ηc meson. Its central section was a spark chamber surrounded by a nearly-complete sphere of scintillating crystals (NaI(Tl)), for which it was named. With the addition of endcaps of similar construction, the detector covered 98% of the solid angle around the interaction point.

After its decommissioning at SLAC, the detector was carried to DESY, where it was used for b-physics experiments.

In 1996, it was moved to the Alternating Gradient Synchrotron (AGS) at Brookhaven National Laboratory, where it was used in a series of pion- and kaon-induced experiments on the proton. Currently it is located at Mainz Microtron facility, where it is being used by the A2 Collaboration for a diverse program of measurements using energy tagged Bremsstrahlung photons.
