= Purling Hiss =

Rock Music Project

- Origin: Philadelphia, Pennsylvania, US
- Genres: Indie rock, psychedelic rock, garage rock, experimental rock
- Years active: 2009–present
- Labels: Drag City
- Members: Ben Leaphart; Mike Polizze; Pat Hickey
- Past members: Mike Sneeringer; Kiel Everett daniel provenzano
- Website: www.purlinghiss.com

Purling Hiss is the rock music project of American multi-instrumentalist Mike Polizze. Based in Philadelphia, the project was named so because of its heavy use of distortion and white noise. Originally conceived for his own personal amusement and desire to experiment, Polizze eventually self-released Purling Hiss (2009) and began touring with a live band.

== History ==
Philadelphia-based guitarist and songwriter Mike Polizze founded Purling Hiss in 2009 as an outlet for his solo recordings. Polizze was already an established musical figure in the Philadelphia rock scene, having previously played guitar with Birds of Maya. In 2009, he released his debut album Purling Hiss, which comprised recordings made at his home studio. Purling Hiss' second album Hissteria was released in 2010.

The first show they ever played was opening for Kurt Vile and the Violators at the Tea Bazaar in Charlottesville on October 19, 2010.

After the critical success of Public Service Announcement, Kurt Vile convinced Polizze to assemble a band so they could embark together on a tour across North America. Polizze decided he wanted to perform Purling Hiss' music in a live setting. He recruited Ben Leaphart, his bandmate from Birds of Maya, on drums and Kiel Everett on bass guitar.

Purling Hiss' third album, Water on Mars, followed in 2013 and marked their first studio recording as a band. Their fourth album Weirdon was released in 2014 and continued the band's direction towards a cleaner sound. Pitchfork Media compared it favorably to the indie rock of the 1980s, such as Dinosaur Jr. and fIREHOSE, and said "its upbeat, euphoric outpouring of guitar, bass, and drums, the album retains the solitary, cranky strangeness."

== Discography ==
Studio albums

- Purling Hiss (2009)
- Hissteria (2010)
- Public Service Announcement (2010)
- Water on Mars (2013)
- Weirdon (2014)
- High Bias (2016)
- Drag On Girard (2023)

Extended plays

- Daytrotter Session (2011)
- Lounge Lizards (2011)
- Daytrotter Session (2013)
- Something (2016)
- Meandering Noodle (2016)
- Breeze (2017)
- The Purling Hissterectomy (2017)
- Interstellar Blue (2019)

Singles

- "My Hell" / "Walking Down The Street" (2011)
- "Out Tonight" / "Walkin' with Jesus" (2018)

Compilation albums

- Dizzy Polizzy (2011)
- Paisley Montage (2011)
